= Traditions and student activities at MIT =

Aspect of Massachusetts Institute of Technology culture

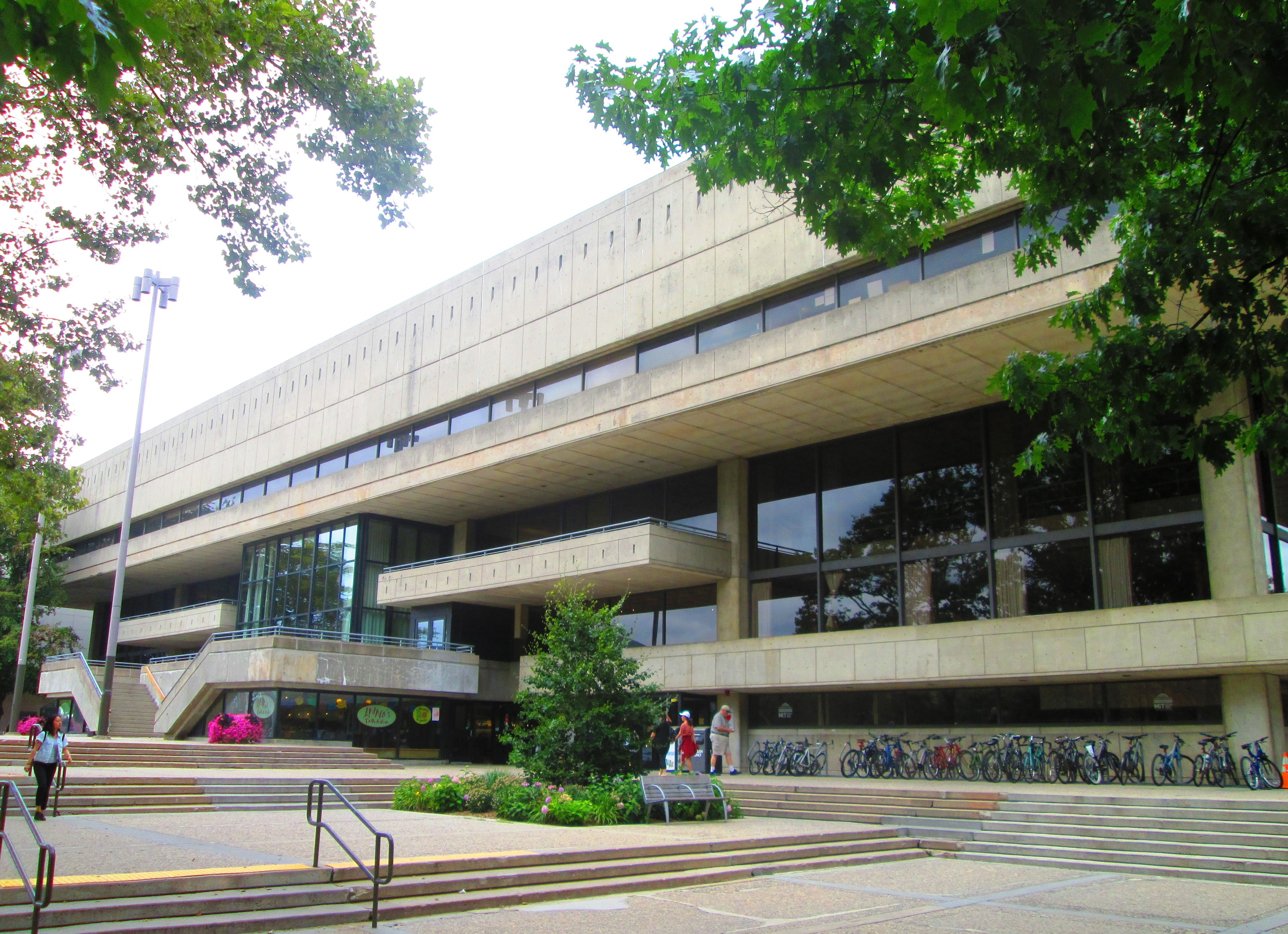
MIT's Stratton Student Center is the site of many student activities

The traditions and student activities at the Massachusetts Institute of Technology encompass hundreds of student activities, organizations, and athletics that contribute to MIT's distinct culture.

== Traditions ==
MIT has relatively few formal traditions, compared to many other universities, but has a rich culture of informal traditions and jargon. There are a few "big events" such as Commencement (graduation), but many smaller, decentralized activities sponsored by departments, labs, living groups, student activities, and ad hoc groups of MIT community members united by common interests.

=== Brass Rat ===
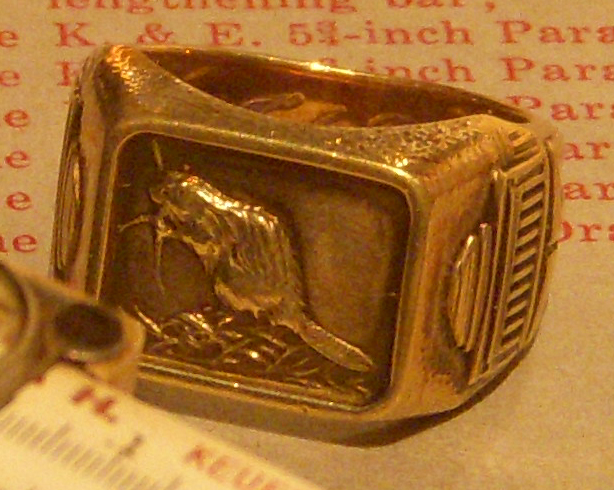
Bezel of the 1930 Brass Rat

"Brass Rat" refers to the MIT class ring, which prominently features the school mascot beaver on the top surface. The ring is traditionally made of gold, the beaver is the largest North American rodent, hence "gold beaver" has informally become "Brass Rat" in student lingo.

=== Course numbering ===
MIT students often refer to both their majors and classes using numbers alone. Majors are numbered in the approximate order of when the department was founded; for example, Civil and Environmental Engineering is pronounced "Course one" and is written "Course 1" or "Course I", while Nuclear Science & Engineering is "Course twenty-two". (Note: Course numbers were traditionally presented in Roman numerals, e.g. "Course XVIII" for mathematics. At least one MIT style guide now discourages this usage. Starting in 2002, the Bulletin (MIT's course catalog) started to use Arabic numerals. Usage outside of the Bulletin varies, both Roman and Arabic numerals being used. Also, some Course numbers have been re-assigned over time, so that the subject area of a degree may depend on the year it was awarded.) Students majoring in Electrical Engineering and Computer Science (EECS), the most popular department, collectively identify themselves as "Course six".

MIT students use a combination of the department's Course number and a number assigned to the class to identify their subjects; the course which many universities would designate as "Physics 101" is, at MIT, "8.01". For brevity, course number designations are pronounced without the decimal point and by replacing "oh" for zero (unless zero is the last number). Thus, "8.01" is pronounced eight oh one, "2.009" is pronounced two double oh nine, and "5.60" would be pronounced five sixty. This naming is not internally consistent: for example, the digital systems course "6.111" is pronounced six one eleven, but the introductory chemistry course "5.111" is pronounced five eleven one.

=== Smoots ===
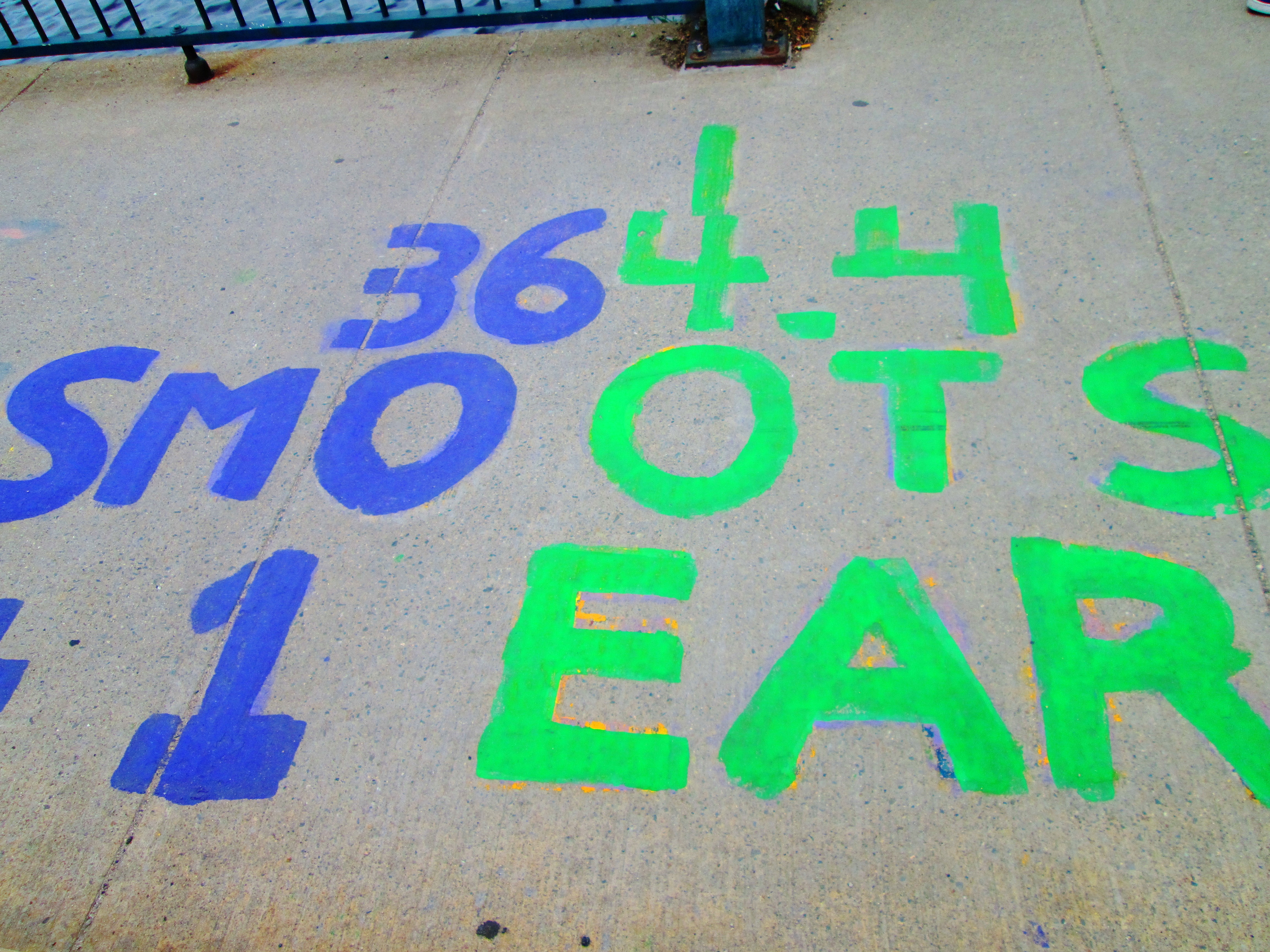
Painted text marks the length of Harvard Bridge in smoots

The "Smoot" is a traditional unit of measuring length on the Harvard Bridge, which despite its name, connects MIT to Boston's Back Bay neighborhood, across the Charles River.

=== Tim the Beaver ===
The beaver is the official mascot of MIT, appearing at athletic events, fundraisers, and other occasions. A beaver was selected as the MIT mascot because beavers are "nature's engineers". This decision was made at the Technology Club of New York's annual dinner on January 17, 1914 upon proposal by President Richard Maclaurin. The beaver's name, "Tim", was given by 1985; it is "MIT" spelled backwards. The sports teams at MIT often choose to feature Tim the Beaver as their mascot, and go by the name "The Engineers".

== Recurring events ==
=== Bad Ideas Festival ===
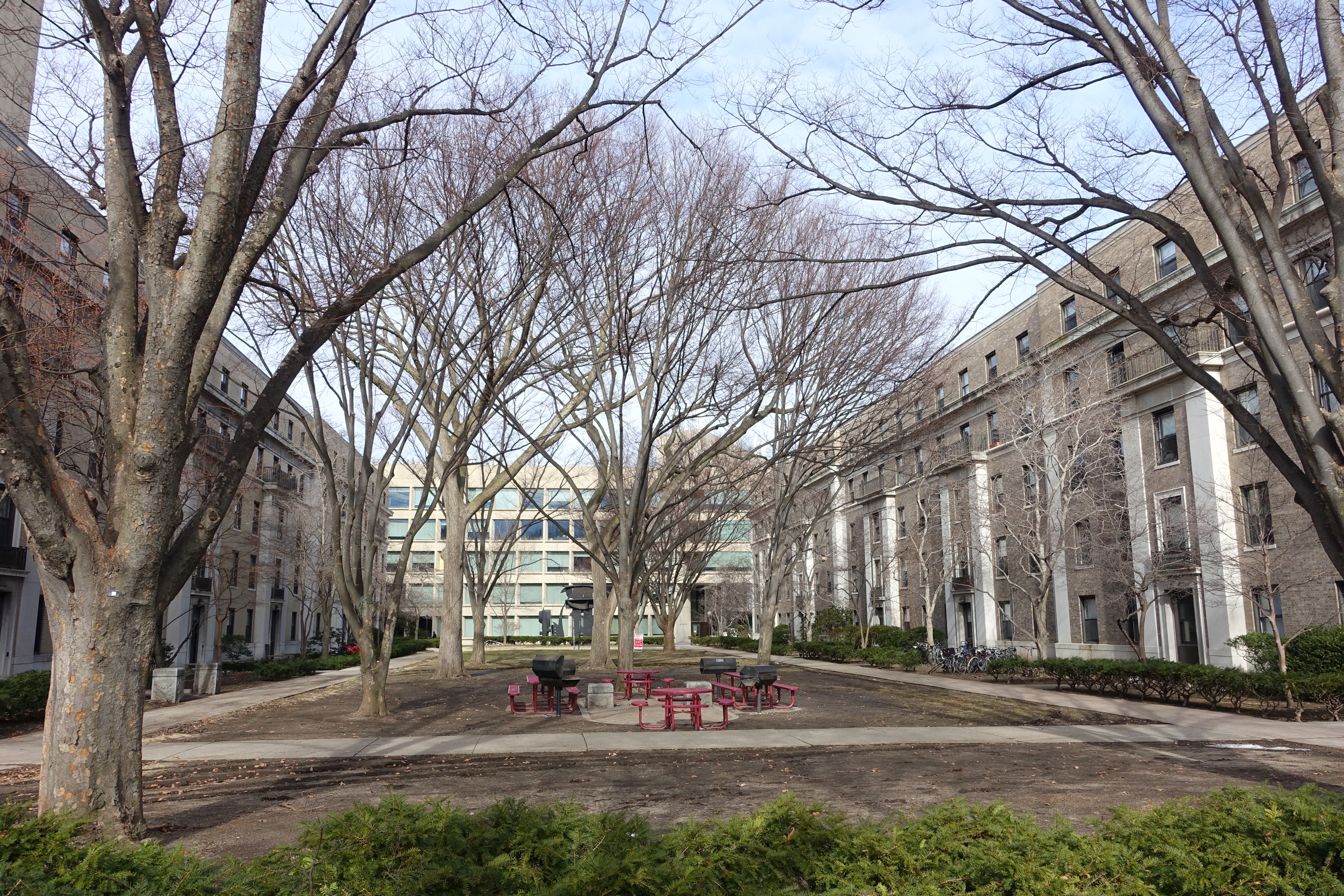
The East Campus courtyard is the site of many Bad Ideas Festival and East Campus Rush events

This event, which usually takes place between the parallels of the East Campus dormitories, features oddball activities, stunts, and constructions. Notable Bad Ideas events include temporary roller coasters and the Green Building Challenge. The event takes place during the last weekend of January.

=== Baker House Piano Drop ===
Each spring, the denizens of Baker House drop an old, irreparable piano off the roof to let it plunge six stories onto the ground, to celebrate Drop Date, the last date one can drop classes at MIT. The resulting dent in asphalt has spawned a unit of volume, known as the Bruno.

=== Campus Preview Weekend ===
Campus Preview Weekend (CPW) is a relatively new event sponsored by the Admissions Office, which invites recently admitted high school students to visit the campus before deciding whether or not to attend MIT. Invited students can sample classes, tour the campus, attend special events, and stay overnight with MIT students. The first fully inclusive event was held in 1999. 2013's CPW was held around early to mid April.

=== East Campus Rush ===
Immediately before the beginning of Fall term, during Orientation Week for new students, residents of East Campus dormitory construct large-scale temporary structures, such as a roller coaster, in the space between the parallel wings of the residence. These projects are large enough that the City of Cambridge requires detailed engineering drawings in advance, plus a letter from a licensed engineer certifying that the design conforms to local building codes.

=== Independent Activities Period ===
Independent Activities Period (IAP) is a four-week-long inter-semester "term" offering hundreds of optional classes, lectures, demonstrations, and other activities throughout the month of January between the Fall and Spring terms. The final event is a half-day "Charm School" sponsored by the Student Activities Office. The first IAP was in 1971.

=== DTYD (Dance Till You Drop) ===
Dance (previously Drink) Till You Drop (DTYD) is an annual party, hosted by the Burton-Conner living group the Burton 3rd Bombers, which is typically held the Sunday of Patriot's Day weekend in the Burton-Conner House Porter Room. The party has been traditionally accompanied by a hack and hosted live music, and is open to the entire campus. First hosted in 1969, the event celebrated its 50th anniversary in 2019.

=== Ring events ===
The Brass Rat undergraduate ring is designed and presented in the sophomore year of each class. The design is unveiled during the Ring Premiere in the fall term, which is followed months later by the Ring Delivery in the spring term. The latter has been a tradition since 1999 (Class of 2001), and is typically a formal occasion, often held off campus.

=== Spring Weekend ===
Spring Weekend is an annual event that includes performances by local as well as major recording artists as well as picnics, parties, home varsity games, and other celebrations.

=== Steer Roast ===
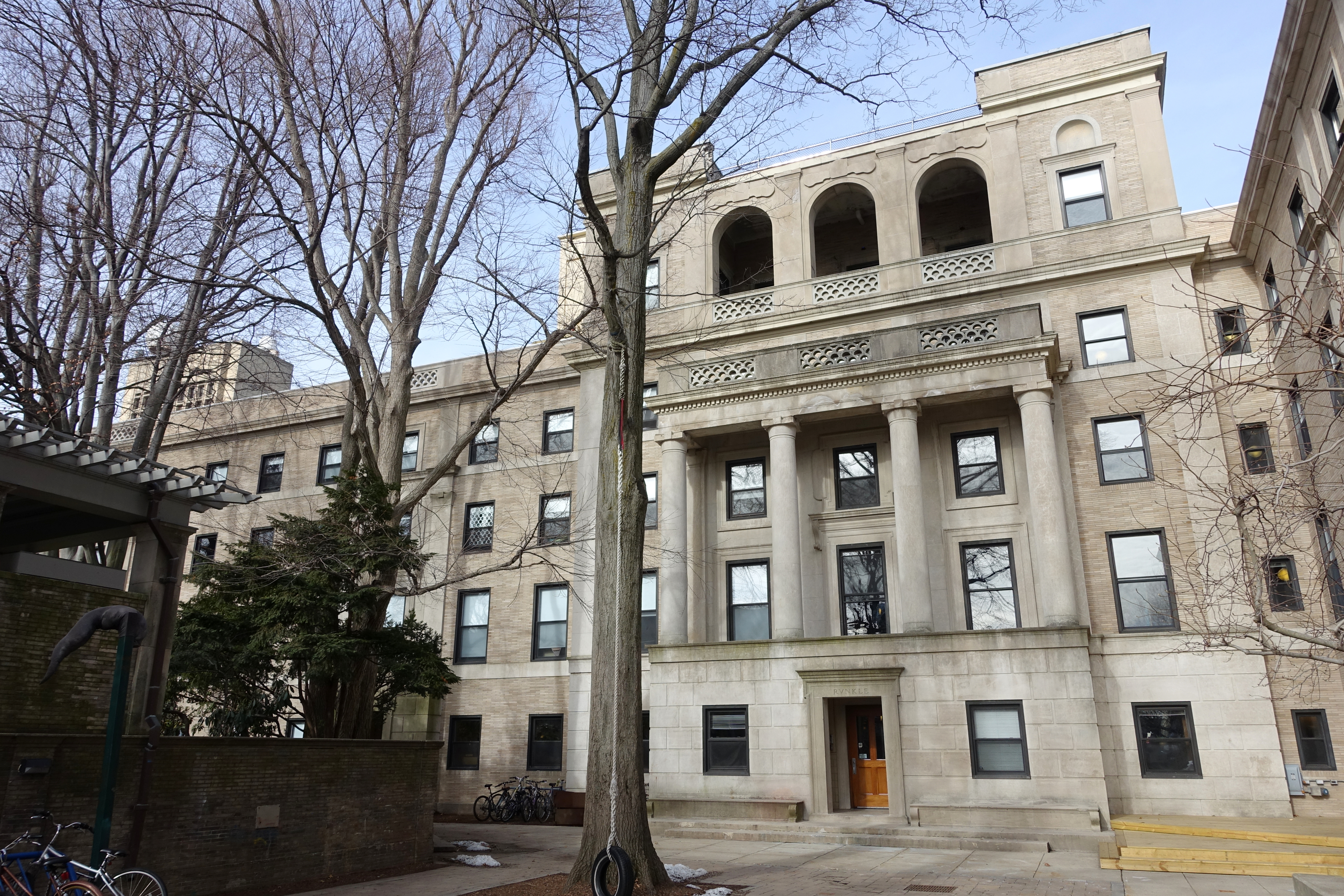
Courtyard of Senior House, the site of Steer Roast

Steer Roast is an annual weekend of celebration and festivities hosted by Senior House. The first Steer Roast took place in the spring of 1964, and this MIT tradition was maintained for over fifty years on the first weekend of every May. In May 2014, Senior House celebrated its 50th anniversary of Steer Roast. In the past MIT presidents and professors attended, but this time no presidential appearance occurred, in spite of the usual invitations. Then in 2017, Steer Roast was to be held during the first weekend of May, but two weeks before that, the event was cancelled by MIT administrators. Soon afterwards, in spite of student and alumni pleas and protests, Senior House itself was closed down. In May 2017, Steer Roast was celebrated off campus and on schedule.

=== Harvard and MIT Aphrodite Project ===
The Harvard and MIT Aphrodite Project is an annual matchmaking event where thousands of students complete a psychology questionnaire and are matched with their best algorithmic match for valentine's day across the two universities.

== Non-recurring and sporadic events ==
=== Annual Spontaneous Tuition Riot ===
This "annual" event is generally not scheduled in advance, but occurs spontaneously in the Spring in response to the MIT administration's announcement of the tuition increase for the following year. The "riot" usually consists of a noisy protest march through the campus, accompanied by traditional chants of "$$$ is Too Damn Much!", where "$$$" is replaced by the newly announced tuition amount. Participants generally let off steam in a good-natured way, and injuries or property damage are extremely rare. The tradition has died out and then been revived several times.

=== Chrysalis, Monarch, and Daedalus human-powered aircraft ===
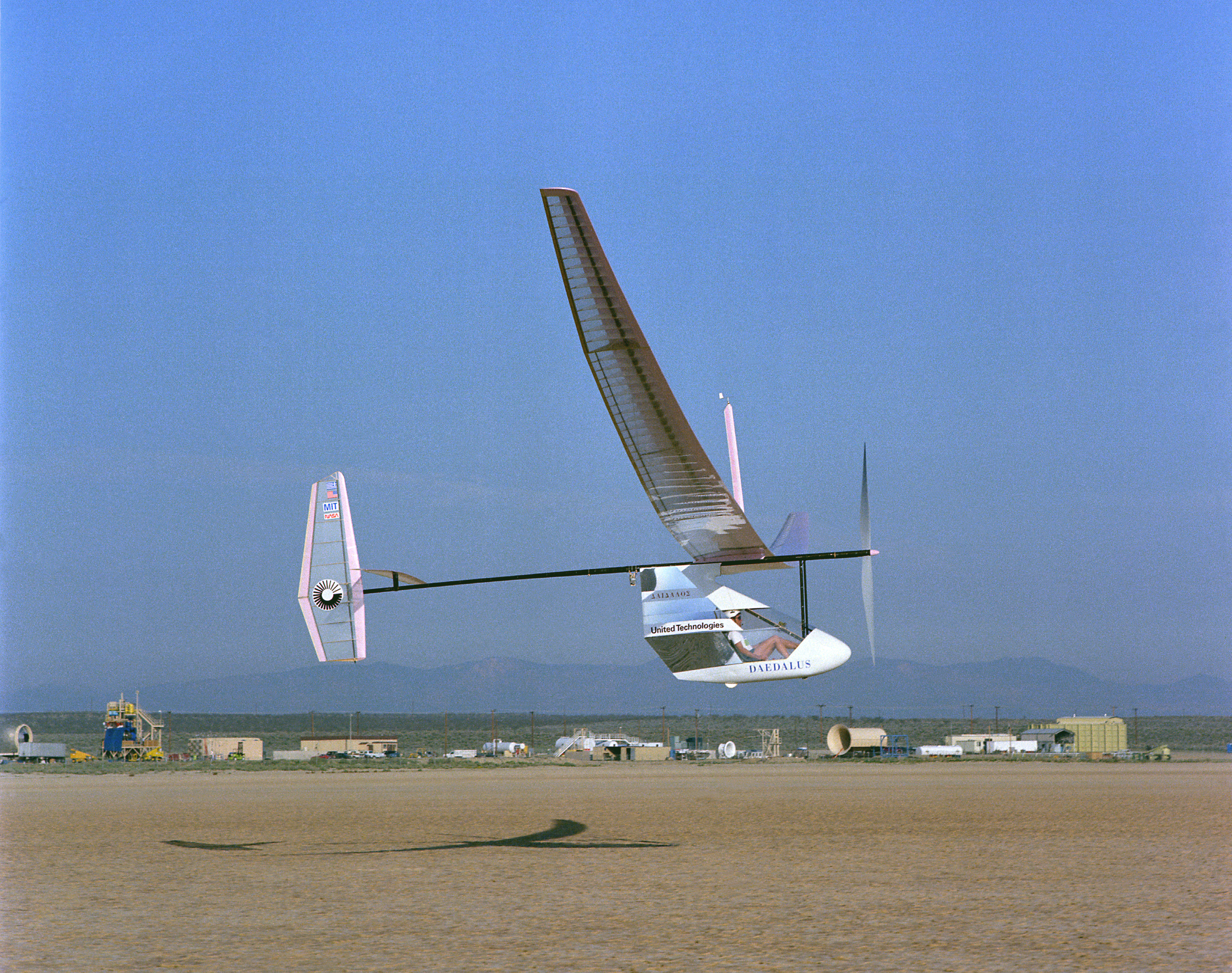
The MIT Daedalus human-powered aircraft

From the 1970s until the early 1990s, MIT had a succession of student-led projects which designed, built, and flew human-powered aircraft (HPA), starting with BURD and BURD II, and evolving into the flight of the Chrysalis in 1979, the first of the MIT HPAs to successfully fly. Chrysalis went on to have over 44 pilots, including the first female pilots of an HPA.

The Monarch A was an HPA built and flown by a student team in 1983, with the aim of winning a £20,000 Kremer Prize for sustaining a speed of over 30 km/h over a 1.5 km triangular course. A modified version of that craft, the MIT Monarch B, won the prize the following year. The Chrysalis and the Monarch HPAs were precursors to the Daedalus aircraft, which flew, solely under human-power, from Crete to the island of Santorini off the Greek mainland in 1988.

=== MIT Gangnam Style ===
MIT students produced "MIT Gangnam Style", a lighthearted parody of the "Gangnam Style" music video which was an Internet phenomenon in 2012. The video featured hundreds of MIT students dancing in a wide overview of dozens of extracurricular student activities across the campus. The music video closely followed the original version, and included cameo appearances by MIT professors Donald Sadoway, recognized by Time Magazine in 2012 as one of the "Top 100 Most Influential People in the World", Eric Lander, who was co-chairman of President Barack Obama's Council of Advisors on Science and Technology, and Noam Chomsky, a pioneer of modern linguistics.

=== Sodium Drop ===
The Sodium Drop traditionally consisted of a bar of metallic sodium dropped into the Charles River, producing loud explosions due to the rapid exothermic conversion of sodium metal to sodium hydroxide and the ignition of the resulting hydrogen gas. In the past, Sodium Drops occurred sporadically, initiated by impromptu groups of students from various dorms and fraternities.

However, in 2007, five volunteers using a boat to clean up trash from the river banks were injured by a small explosion and fire, apparently caused by unreacted sodium residue. MIT quickly donated funds to pay for decontaminating and repairing the boat, although it was not clear at the time who was responsible for the damage.

A criminal case was initiated, and a graduate student accepted responsibility, resulting in a fine and a community-service sentence. In addition, a long-running civil suit against a fraternity resulted from this incident, culminating in a six-figure out-of-court settlement. The student newspaper The Tech has published an editorial urging readers to take responsibility for any injuries to innocent parties that result from the prank.

=== Time Traveler Convention ===
The Time Traveler Convention was a single-event convention held at MIT on May 7, 2005, in the hopes of making contact with time travelers from the future. The convention was organized by Amal Dorai with help from current and former residents of the MIT living group Putz, one of the halls in the East Campus dorm. As of the date of the event, it was the most significantly publicized Time Traveler Convention, including front-page coverage in the New York Times, Wired, and Slashdot. It was presumed time travelers would have the capability to visit any particular time if they could travel to that general time period at all. The idea originated in a Cat and Girl strip by Dorothy Gambrell.

The convention was held at 22:00 EDT on May 7, 2005 (May 8, 02:00 UTC) in the East Campus courtyard and Walker Memorial at MIT. That location is 42.360007 degrees north latitude, 71.087870 degrees west longitude. The Convention was announced in advance (that is, before the event) and over 300 contemporary people attended. (For fire safety reasons, a handful of attendees watched the convention via a closed circuit broadcast.) The spacetime coordinates continued to be publicized prominently and indefinitely, so that future time travelers will be aware and have the opportunity to attend.

The convention featured lectures on various aspects of time travel from MIT professors and faculty, including Erik Demaine, a MacArthur "genius grant" winner, Alan Guth, an Eddington Medal winner for theoretical astrophysics, and Edward Farhi, winner of numerous MIT teaching awards. A Delorean, the car featured in the Back to the Future trilogy, was also on display, near the "landing pad" located at the exact coordinates advertised.

The convention inspired a full-length musical entitled The Time Travelers Convention, in which three college students, who all want to change their pasts, hold a convention in the hopes that they will be able to borrow an attendee's time machine. Although the school in the musical is not MIT, MIT is mentioned twice, once by name and once in the coordinates, which are the same as the coordinates given in the original convention.

== Hacking ==
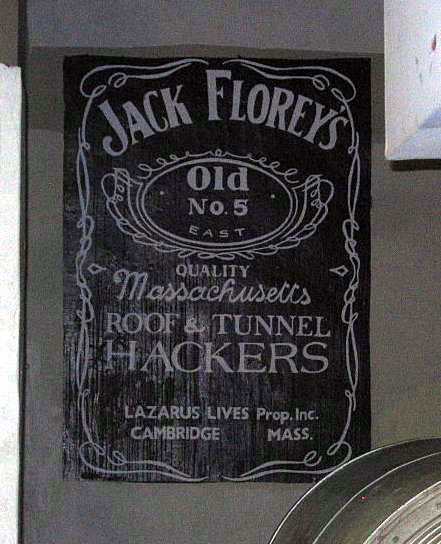
A mural created by MIT hackers

Hacking at MIT can refer to two distinct but closely related activities. Both have a rich history at MIT, despite being unsanctioned activities and often violating official policies.

=== MIT hacks ===
A "hack" is a practical joke or prank display anonymously installed usually during the night. Many hacks commemorate historical or popular culture events, particularly those relevant to science and technology.

=== Roof and tunnel hacking ===
The term "hacking" typically refers to the activity of roof and tunnel hacking, where students explore building rooftops, steam tunnels, and utility shafts.

== Activities ==
MIT has over 380 recognized student activity groups. These are mostly governed by the MIT Association of Student Activities.

=== Educational Studies Program ===
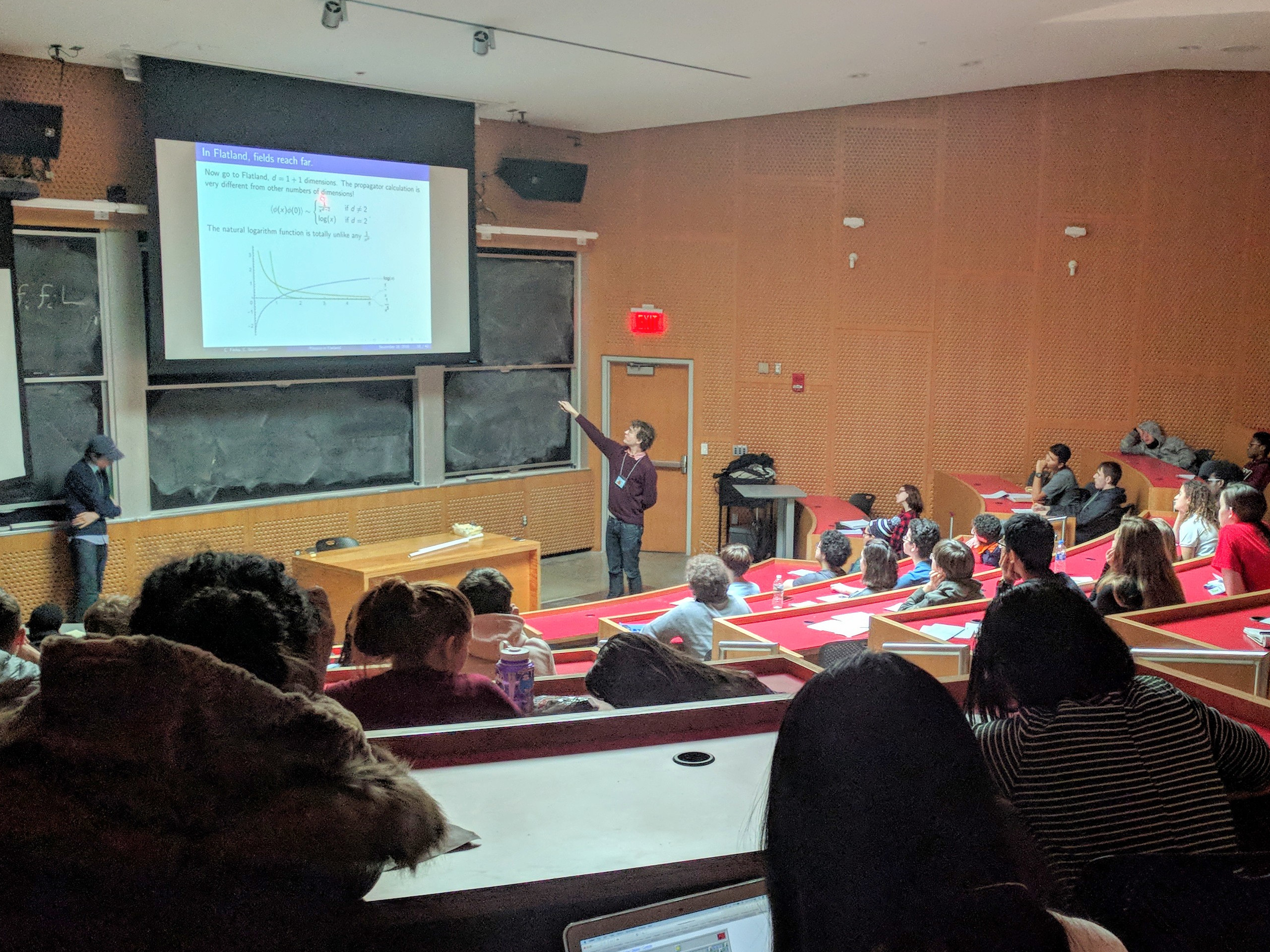
Christian Ferko and Colin Nancarrow teach a class called "Quantum Physics in Flatland" to high school students at MIT ESP Splash 2018.

The MIT Educational Studies Program (ESP) was created by MIT students in 1957 to make a difference in the community by sharing MIT's knowledge and creativity with local high school students. Since then, its programs have grown to support well over 3000 students each year. ESP classes are developed and taught by MIT undergraduates, graduate students, alumni, and members of the local community. ESP's students are given the chance to learn from passionate and knowledgeable teachers; ESP's teachers can gain experience developing their own curricula with access to students with strong desires to learn.

ESP pioneered Splash, a large, short-term academic outreach program that involves over two thousand teachers and five hundred classes. The program has grown in popularity and attracted students from well beyond the local Boston area. Splash emphasizes having a diverse range of class topics, covering a variety of academic fields as well as non-academic games and practical skills.

In 2007, ESP alumni founded Learning Unlimited (LU), a non-profit organization dedicated to supporting educational opportunities like Splash at universities throughout the United States and beyond. LU provides assistance, including mentorship and software support, that helps new Splash programs start successfully. As of 2020, there are over thirty LU affiliated programs in the United States and one in the United Kingdom.

=== Lecture Series Committee ===
The Lecture Series Committee (LSC) organizes weekly screenings of popular films as well as lectures by prominent speakers.

As one of the few Institute-wide gatherings on a weekly basis over the years, LSC movie screenings have developed and retained a few quirky traditions which sometimes befuddle outsiders. One unspoken tradition relates to the 1950s style introductory film clips that announce "coming attractions" movie trailers. When stereophonic sound was a new development in movies, the movie trailers would be preceded by a clip announcing, "Coming Next Week", followed by "In Stereo". For whatever reason, MIT audiences would spontaneously read the announcements aloud, in unison. This eventually became such an ingrained habit that, even though LSC discontinued screening the "stereo" announcements, the audience would intone the (now unseen) words. Even though LSC has replaced the sound system several times since the appearance of stereo sound, and now operates a Dolby/Bose multi-channel theatrical sound system, the tradition has continued unchanged for decades.

A second tradition is less obscure; if there is an annoying technical problem with the screening (e.g. bad focus, bad sound, a botched film reel switchover), eventually an annoyed patron will yell out "Focus!" (for example), and "LSC...Sucks!", with the crowd chiming in loudly on the second word. This outcry alerts the projectionist, who might not have noticed the defect, to fix the problem.

=== Student Information Processing Board ===
The Student Information Processing Board (SIPB) is a computing and information technology student group at MIT. SIPB was founded in 1969 by Bob Frankston. The organization helps MIT students access computing resources and use them effectively.

SIPB has funded, developed, and maintained several important software projects at MIT, including a dynamic web hosting service, a course planning assistant, a virtual machine service, and an instant messaging client. SIPB has contributed extensively to Project Athena, the distributed academic computing environment used at MIT today.

=== TechX ===
Logo for HackMIT 2016

TechX is a student group that organizes events that bring technology, new ideas, and tech-industry innovators to MIT's campus. These events include:

- HackMIT, the university's largest annual hackathon
- xFair, a job fair and technology expo
- MakeMIT, a hackathon dedicated to hardware and making
- Blueprint, a hackathon for local high school students
- THINK, a STEM educational outreach initiative
- ProjX, a program that provides funding for MIT student projects

=== Miscellaneous ===
MIT has many student groups. Other notable ones include:

- MIT EMS — student-run ambulance
- MIT Outing Club — student-run outdoors club
- Pi Tau Sigma — Mechanical Engineering honorary society
- Eta Kappa Nu — Electrical Engineering and Computer Science honorary society
- MIT Science Fiction Society — claims to have the "world's largest open-shelf collection of science fiction" in English.
- MIT Assassins' Guild — a live-action roleplaying group
- Sloan Business Club — Largest undergraduate business club
- MIT Radio Society (W1MX) - student-run amateur radio club
- MIT UHF Repeater Association (W1XM) - student-run amateur radio club

== Competitions ==
=== $100K Entrepreneurship Competition ===
The annual MIT $100K Entrepreneurship Competition has supported the creation of at least 60 companies worth a combined $10.5 billion since it started in 1990.

=== Harvard–MIT Mathematics Tournament ===
The Harvard–MIT Mathematics Tournament (HMMT) is a mathematics competition for high school students. It is held twice each year in February and November.

=== IDEAS Global Challenge ===
MIT IDEAS Global Challenge encourages teams to develop and implement projects that make a positive change in the world. Entries are judged on their innovation, feasibility, and community impact. One component of the competition is the Yunus Challenge, named in honor of 2006 Nobel Prize winner Dr. Muhammad Yunus, where teams are invited to tackle a specific development need. Previous topics include increasing adherence to tuberculosis drug regimens and affordable small-scale energy storage.

The competition was developed in part by Amy Smith, who has developed a number of inventions useful to poor communities.

=== Mystery Hunt ===
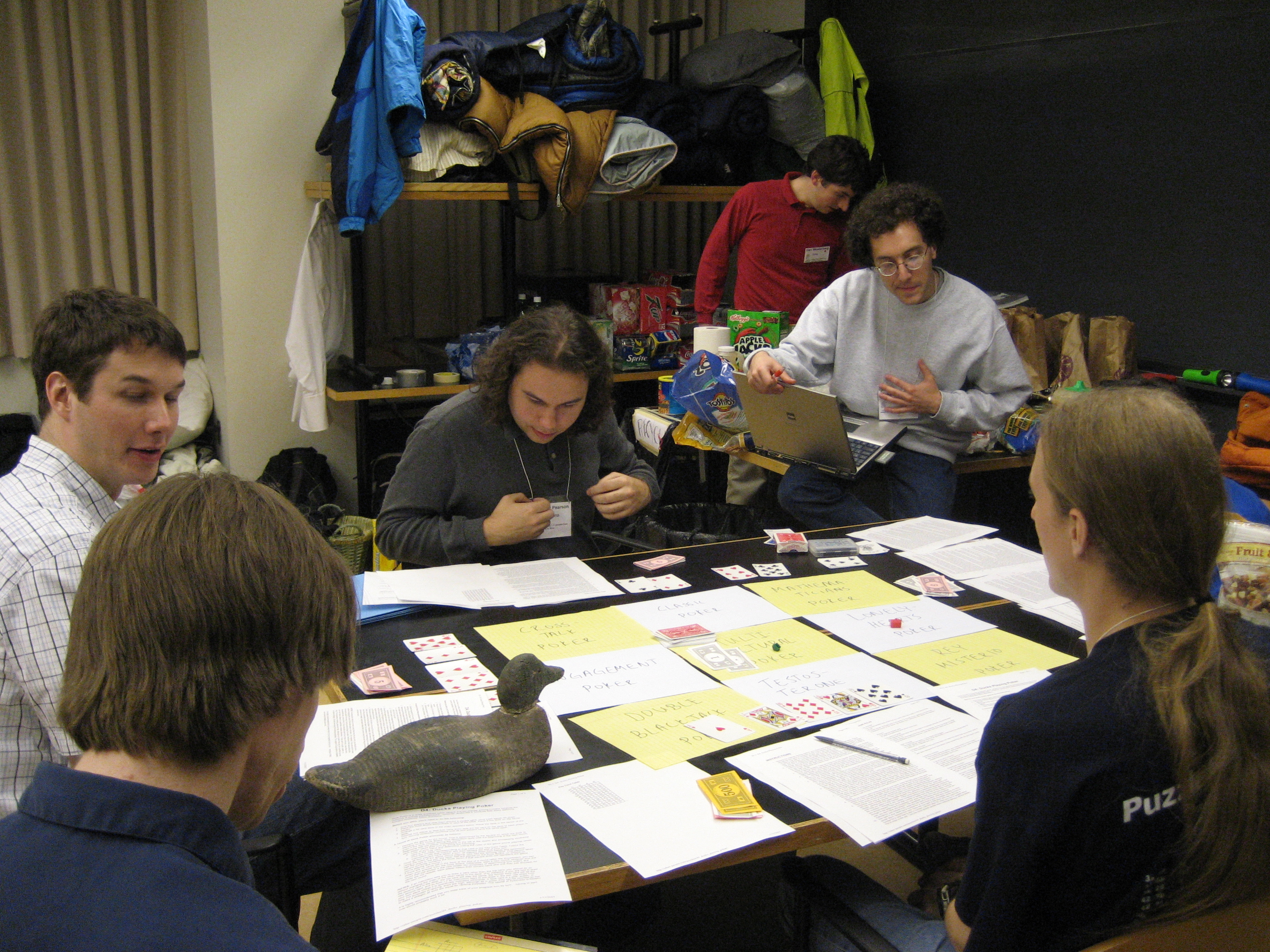
A MIT Mystery Hunt team solves puzzles in a room with chalkboards, projectors, computers, and food

The MIT Mystery Hunt is one of the world's oldest puzzlehunts. It is held annually in January over the Martin Luther King Jr. Day long weekend, during MIT's IAP period.

=== THINK Competition ===
THINK stands for Technology for Humanity guided by Innovation, Networking, and Knowledge. The competition challenges high school students across the United States to take a refreshing approach to designing a technological solution to a social problem. Its founding vision is that applicants will learn how to be resourceful in society, which makes networking a core component of the competition. It aims to connect high school students with professors and MIT students so that they can develop an innovation for the world.

Each year, six high school student groups are invited to MIT to attend Techfair and to present their project proposal to the THINK administrators. The proposal consists of a summary, technical plan, and budget. Three student groups are then chosen to develop their proposals over a semester long period.

=== IAP Competitions ===
==== Battlecode (6.147) ====
Battlecode, also known previously as The ACM/IEEE Programming Competition, 6.370, or RoboCraft, is a computer game AI programming competition. It was originally organized by the MIT ACM/IEEE Club, but is now a separate student organization.

Battlecode held every year during the Independent Activities Period at MIT, and the competition is changed annually. The game consists of armies of virtual robots battling each other, controlled solely by the AIs written by competition participants. For many years, Battlecode was programmed in Java. As of 2018, C, Java, and Python are supported.

The final tournament is held in Kresge Auditorium, and features commentary from the contestants and Battlecode developers.

As of 2008, Battlecode has been opened up to virtually anyone interested in participating outside of MIT. The competition is a class at MIT and its software has been used for several other classes and projects.

=== Other Competitions ===
- 2.007 Design & Manufacturing competition
- MIT ASO Science and Technology Awards

== Performing arts ==
=== Asymptones ===
The Asymptones are MIT's lowest time-commitment a cappella group. Founded in 2007, they have regular concerts in conjunction with Roadkill Buffet, the on campus improv comedy group, focusing on parodies and more meme-y songs.

=== Chorallaries ===
The Chorallaries of MIT are the first co-ed a cappella performing group at the Massachusetts Institute of Technology. Founded in the winter of 1976–77, the group is typically composed of undergraduates, graduates, and occasionally faculty. They perform several free public concerts a year on the MIT campus, as well as at a numerous on-campus events and at concerts, festivals, and private venues off-campus. The Chorallaries, as keepers of the MIT alma mater ("Arise All Ye of MIT") also perform at Freshman Convocation in September and at the Commencement Ceremony in June.

Their signature song, the Engineer's Drinking Song, is a traditional tech favorite.

The Chorallaries compete in the International Championship of Collegiate A Cappella every three years; they won the quarter-finals in 2000, 2003, and 2006, as well as the semi-finals in 1996 and 2006. In 2010 the Chorallaries of MIT released their most recent album "Stereophony", whose track "Hot Air Balloon" was featured on both Voices Only 2010 and Best of College A Cappella 2011. Previous recognitions include:

- "Papercut" (Positive Chorallation) – nominated for Best Mixed Song from the Contemporary A Cappella Recording Awards (CARA)
- "Rainbow Connection" (Positive Chorallation) – Voices Only 2008.
- "Pretty Good Year" (Contents Under Pressure) – Best of College A Cappella 1999

In total, the Chorallaries have produced 15 albums:

- Seeing Red (2019)
- Dischord (2017)
- Stereophony (2010)
- Positive Chorallation (2007)
- Staring Down the Infinite (2004)
- Chorallaries Live: Spring Concert (2003)
- After Taste (2002)
- Pokerface (2001)
- Contents Under Pressure (1998)
- Earshot (1995)
- Better Late Than Never (1993)
- TimeSync (1989)
- No Instruments Allowed (1985)
- Making It In Massachusetts (1981)
- Take Me Back to Tech (19??)

The group is known for its humor and creativity, culminating in "The Nth Annual Concert in Bad Taste".

Bad Taste is a concert devoted solely to off-color, nerdy, controversial, offensive, and often humorous material; a good-faith effort is made to offend everybody equally, but no quarter is given. Popular topics include: offensive sexual references; mocking the MIT administration; lambasting Harvard University, Wellesley College, Simmons College and other colleges in the region; excruciatingly hilarious science puns; and disgusting sexual references. The concert is usually about 2½ hours long, with a mixture of skits, songs, and general hilarity.

=== Cross Products ===
The Cross Products are MIT's Christian co-ed a cappella singing group. Founded in 1988, their stated purpose is: "We exist to glorify God through music, and to tell others about the ways that He has changed our lives: we are each products of the cross of Jesus Christ."

=== Folk Dance Club ===
The MIT Folk Dance Club, founded in 1959, sponsors 3 public dance sessions every week: international folk dancing, contra dancing, and Israeli dancing. In the 1960s it sponsored four Folk Dance Festivals.

=== Gamelan Galak Tika ===
Founded and directed by Professor Evan Ziporyn in September 1993, this MIT-based authentic gamelan orchestra performs on campus, and has toured nationally and internationally, including to Bali, Indonesia, the birthplace of this musical genre. The ensemble performs classical Balinese compositions with traditionally costumed dancers, as well as contemporary and experimental pieces specially commissioned for the group. Experimental pieces have incorporated non-traditional instruments such as electric guitars, glass chimes, and one-of-a-kind novel electronic and computer-controlled instruments, in a variety of musical styles. Guest composer-performers have included Terry Riley, a pioneer of minimal music. Christine Southworth, an MIT alumna, has performed several of her compositions and has long been an active member of the orchestra.

Gamelan Galak Tika uses authentic percussion instruments made in Indonesia, and the musicians perform barefoot in authentic Balinese costumes. Concerts are usually started with placement of a traditional Balinese centerpiece made of fresh fruit onto the stage (incense sticks were lit up in earlier years, but this practice was discontinued due to concerns about allergies and poor indoor air quality). After a concert, the audience is usually invited to come up on stage to get a closer look at the gamelan instruments, and to try hands-on playing of them under the guidance of orchestra members. Also, pieces of the fresh fruit centerpiece are offered to audience members, for a gustatory remembrance of the event.

The group learns aurally, without the aid of musical notation, and functions in the tradition of a Balinese village sekeha, with decisions made communally and responsibilities shared among the members of the ensemble. The name of the ensemble means "intense togetherness" in Bahasa Kawi (classical Javanese, a dialect of Sanskrit), and is also a cross-lingual pun on the title of the old television show Battlestar Galactica. The group performs with three sets of gamelan instruments: a traditional pelog set, another tuned in just intonation, and the completely electronic Gamelan Elektrika, based on a design developed at the MIT Media Lab.

=== Live Music Connection (LMC) ===
A co-op of MIT's bands on campus, the LMC provides a venue for artists to play as well as open jam sessions for students. Started in 2009 by MIT student band, The Guitar Knives, the LMC is now an official student group that holds concerts about once every 2 weeks in the Student Center, usually featuring 2 MIT bands. The LMC recently put out the first official CD of MIT bands that can be found on their website, as well as below. This sets a precedent at the school in that the CD is offered for Free Download, publicizing MIT's up and coming artists that also play the LMC's Concert Series. The LMC is also responsible for holding MIT's Battle of the Bands at Campus Preview Weekend, which it has recently taken over and established as a competitive ground for solely MIT bands.

=== Logarhythms ===
Founded in 1949, the MIT Logarhythms is an all-male a cappella performance group at the Massachusetts Institute of Technology. The Logs began as a close-harmony octet, singing popular and comedy melodies of the 1940s. The Logarhythms were named by one of their founding members, Ed Kerwin. Their current repertoire consists primarily of modern pop, hip hop, and classic rock, and their close-harmony lives on in many tunes.

The Logs perform throughout Massachusetts and the New England area. Recent biannual tours have included performances around Washington DC, California, Michigan, and Texas. The group has earned songs on the Best of College A Cappella (BOCA) compilation albums from 2003, 2004, 2005, and 2009, and their album Soundproof received near-perfect marks in its review from the Recorded A Cappella Review Board.

In March 2007, the Logs participated in and took first place in WERS' All A Cappella Live competition at the Majestic Theatre in Boston, competing against the Tufts Beelzebubs, Brandeis VoiceMale, and the Harvard Low Keys.

- Give Us Back Our Spyplane (2008)
- Natural (2006)
- Soundproof (2004)
- Superlogs (2002)
- Mind the Logs (1999)
- Redwood (1997)
- Songs From The Bagel (1994)

Natural features cover songs performed and recorded by the '04–05 and '05–06 members of the MIT Logarhythms. The tracks were recorded at MIT at the Logarhythms' studio. Tracks were subsequently mixed by producer John Clark.

"Part-Time Lover" soloist Chris Vu won a 2007 CARA award as Best Male Collegiate Soloist. "Such Great Heights" received a 2007 CARA nomination for Best Male Collegiate Song.

Soundproof features cover songs performed and recorded by the '02–03 and '03–04 members of the MIT Logarhythms. The tracks were recorded at MIT at the Logarhythms' newly built studio. Track one was mixed by Viktor Kray. All remaining tracks were mixed by John Clark.

"The Kids Aren't Alright" was featured as the first track on the Best of College A Cappella 2005 compilation. "No Such Thing" appeared as track nine on the Best of College A Cappella 2004 compilation. "Learn to Fly" was Runner Up for Best Male Collegiate Arrangement in the 2005 CARA awards.

=== Marching Band ===
The MIT Marching Band is purely student run, and is open to the entire MIT community.

The band plays at all types of events year-round. In its recent history, it has performed at football, basketball, lacrosse, field hockey, women's rugby, water polo, and hockey games. The band has also played for events such as the re-opening of the MIT Museum and the Cambridge Science Festival. During MIT's Campus Preview Weekend in April, the band leads the prospective freshmen from the keynote address in Rockwell Cage to an activities fair in Johnson Ice Rink. Every December, the band tours downtown Boston playing holiday music.

=== Muses ===
The MIT Muses, MIT's only all-female a cappella group, was founded in 1988.

The name of the a cappella group is based on the definition of the ancient Greek Muses. The members of the MIT Muses named their first album Ambrosia because it was the food of the ancient Greek gods.

==== Discography ====
- Elysian Fields (1998)
- Ambrosia (1995)

=== Musical Theater Guild ===
The Musical Theatre Guild is an entirely student-run theater group which performs four musicals per year (spring term, summer, fall term, and IAP). Membership is open to anyone, but preference is given to MIT students and MIT community members for cast and production roles. Performances are open to the general public.

In IAP 2003, MTG produced Star Wars: Musical Edition, a musical version of the original Star Wars movie, featuring musical numbers from existing musicals with the lyrics changed to fit the plot. In April 2005, part of the group performed selections from the show at Celebration III, a Star Wars convention for which George Lucas was present. In the fall of 2005, MTG produced Star Wars Trilogy: Musical Edition, which encompassed the entire original trilogy.

=== Resonance ===
MIT Resonance is a student rock/pop a cappella group from MIT. Founded in the 2000–2001 school year, the group is co-ed and typically consists of sixteen undergraduate and graduate students (though its size varies). It is one of seven a cappella groups at the school, and is known across campus for its frequent free performances and its funny, edgy interludes used to keep audiences amused between songs.

Nationally, Resonance is perhaps best known for its recognition through the Contemporary A Cappella Society (CASA), having received a 2004 and 2008 Contemporary A Cappella Recording Award (CARA) nomination for Best Mixed Collegiate Arrangement, a 2008 CARA award for Best Scholastic Original, as well as a berth on the 2006 Best of College A Cappella compilation CD. The group is also known for regularly hosting the International Championship of College A Cappella New England Semifinals.

The group has produced three albums, its latest being the self-titled "Resonance" released in fall 2007.

Resonance was envisioned by Sara Jo Elice who, with her friend (and eventual co-founder) Jessica Hinel, fleshed out the original idea while waiting to audition for an MIT Musical Theatre Guild production. Jay Humphries was auditioning for the same production and ended up becoming an inaugural Resonance member as well. In 2001, the MIT Association of Student Activities recognized Resonance as its seventh a cappella group on campus at the time.

The name Resonance follows an established joke among MIT a cappella groups of using a science or math-based pun to name the group. In science, resonance has to do with vibration and harmony. Specifically, resonant frequencies are the frequencies that cause natural amplification of signal – a commonly cited example being the singer who can, at the right frequency, break glass with their voice. Keeping with the theme, the resonance name is often formatted as "res(((o)))nance". and displayed alongside a logo of a shattered wine glass.

Resonance regularly performs on the MIT campus, at the minimum presenting a single full-length concert per term. Each concert is primarily composed of a collection of songs, both covers and originals, selected and arranged for a cappella by members of the group. Over 100 different songs have been performed by the group since 2001.

Resonance, like many a cappella groups, has a single "alum" song, taught to all members and used to close almost all performances. Group alumni are invited to join the current members on stage to finish the night. Resonance's alum song is "Easy People" by the Nields.

Resonance has released three albums:

- Resonance (2007)
- Left On Red (2005)
- First Harmonic (2003)

Resonance is also featured on two a cappella collections:

- acaTunes Awards 2007 (2007) – Collection, features "So Little Notice" by Sarah Dupuis as performed by Resonance
- Best of College A Cappella 2006 (2006) – Collection, features "Mystify (Atrévete)" by Chenoa as performed by Resonance

All three Resonance full-length albums are available only through the group directly. Best of College A Cappella is produced and distributed to various retail sources by Varsity Vocals. acaTunes awards are produced by acaTunes.

=== Shakespeare Ensemble ===
Founded in 1974, the MIT Shakespeare Ensemble, denoted "Ensemble" for short, is a student-run theater group. The group puts on one Shakespeare play each semester as well as one non-Shakespeare play each IAP and summer. These shows are open to the public. Unlike other MIT theater groups, the Shakespeare Ensemble works with professional directors in the area. In the past, the Ensemble has taken their shows on tour; previous tours have included the East Coast, California, and England.

Ensemble traditions include a bi-annual "spearing" ceremony to welcome new members, as well as a semi-formal gathering called Ensemball. The Ensemble also regularly performs "Scene Nights", which showcase a collection of scenes, and "24-hour shows", which entail writing, rehearsing, and performing a play all within a 24-hour period. Shakespeare Ensemble also has a strong tech community, with its own traditions. One such tradition is the "sex-light", denoting pink- or purple-tinted lights shined during a scene with romantic or sexual connotations.

=== Symphony Orchestra ===
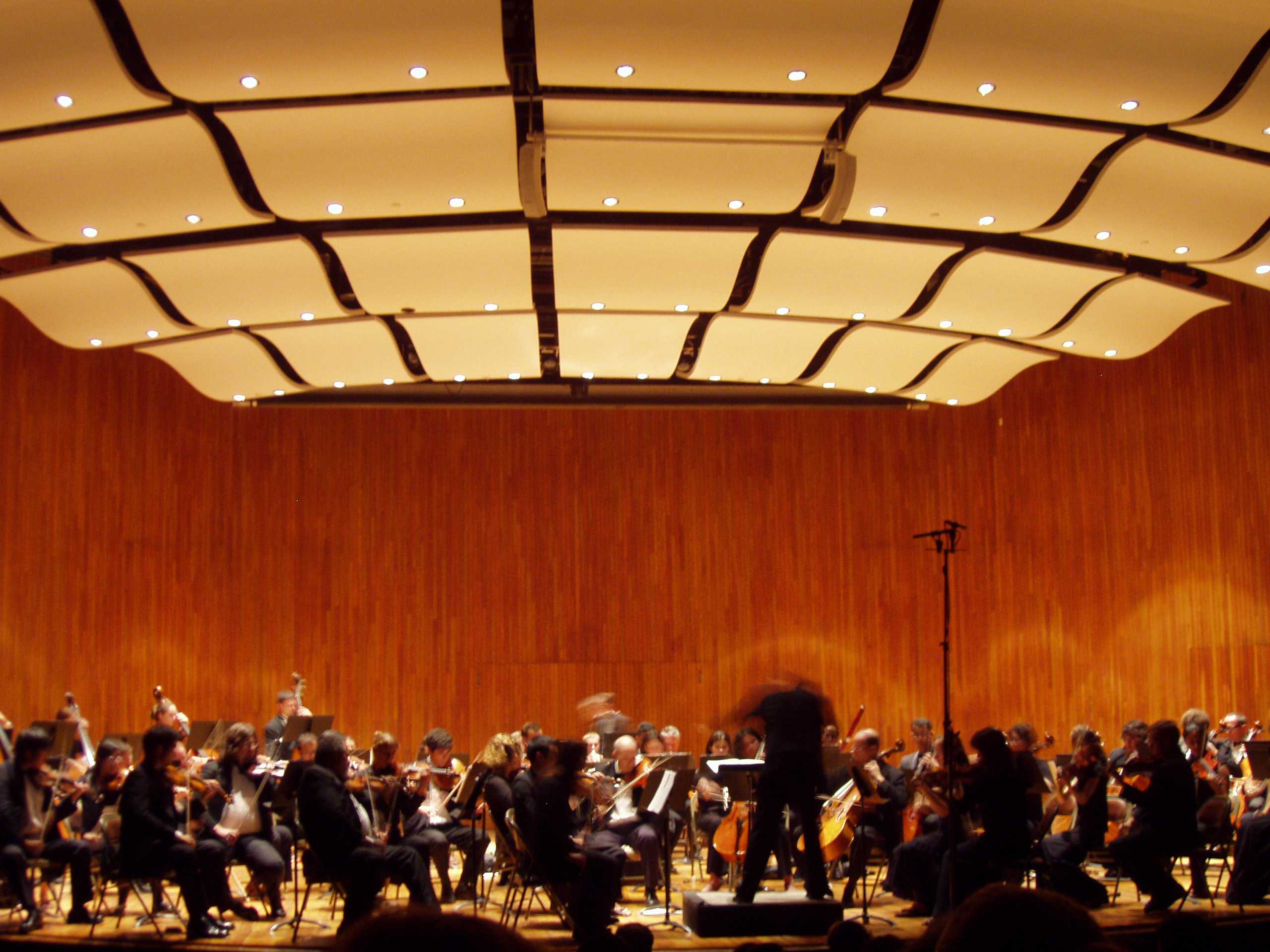
An MIT student orchestra performs in Kresge Auditorium

The MIT Symphony Orchestra is the symphony orchestra of the Massachusetts Institute of Technology.

The origins of the MIT Symphony Orchestra (MITSO) date back as far as 1884 when the first MIT Tech Orchestra appeared on campus along with the Banjo and Glee Clubs. The orchestra disbanded and re-appeared several times over the years that followed until 1947, when Klaus Liepmann (1907–1990), MIT's first full-time professor of music and founder of the music program, became director of the MIT Glee Club, the Symphony and the Choral Society.

Nine years later John Corley (1919–2000) took over the direction of the Symphony until 1966, when David Epstein (1931–2002) became the Symphony Orchestra's music director. Under Prof. Epstein, the orchestra performed at Carnegie Hall and made several LP recordings. David Epstein's tenure ended in the spring of 1998 upon his retirement from the Institute. The MITSO has also performed with artists such as Peter Schickele, when he performed works of P.D.Q. Bach as a dog chained to the concertmaster. After an international search, Dante Anzolini became Music Director of the Orchestra and Associate Professor of Music at MIT in September 1998. For the 2006–2007 season, Paul Biss from Indiana University served as interim conductor for MITSO, and in the fall of 2007, Adam Boyles began his tenure as the current music director.

=== Syncopasian ===
Syncopasian is an Asian a cappella group at MIT. Founded in 2008, Syncopasian's mission is to promote Asian music and pop culture at MIT and in the surrounding community. Unlike other a cappella groups on campus, its repertoire includes songs in not only English, but also in Chinese, Cantonese, Japanese, Korean, and other East Asian languages. The group holds two large concerts in the winter and spring and also performs at a variety of other on-campus events. It released its first album titled Syncopasian in 2011.

=== Techiya ===
Techiya is MIT's Jewish, Hebrew, Israeli a cappella group. Founded in 1994, the group released a demo tape in 1997. Since then, they have released three albums: Half-Life (2002), Techiya Sunrise (2010), and Technetium (2015). The group sings a wide variety of songs, including traditional liturgy, Israeli pop songs, Broadway, and original parodies.

In addition to a concert near the end of each semester, Techiya performed at on-campus events, at local synagogues, and in NYC every spring. They sing songs in many languages, including Hebrew, English, Yiddish, Ladino, French, Japanese, Chinese, Greek, and Amharic. The group unfortunately became inactive around Fall 2017.

=== Tech Squares ===
Tech Squares is a square and round dance club founded in 1967. It is known for technical proficiency, often pursuing difficult and challenging choreography.

=== Toons ===
The MIT/Wellesley Toons are a cross-campus, co-ed college a cappella singing group. Founded in 1990, the group takes its members from both the undergraduate and graduate students of the Massachusetts Institute of Technology and the undergraduates of Wellesley College. The group performs several times each year at free concerts on both campuses, as well as at a variety of other venues both nearby and out-of-state.

The Toons host an annual Concert for a Cure in support of multiple sclerosis research, which draws large crowds from around the Boston area to enjoy music, dance, and other performing arts from a diverse array of groups from New England colleges and universities. The fourth annual concert – held in November 2009 – raised nearly $3000 in audience donations, which was donated to the Accelerated Cure Project.

The Toons have released five albums:

- Part of This Complete Breakfast (2007)
- All Jokes Aside (2003)
- Holding Our Own (2001)
- 59th Street Bridge (1998)
- Target Practice (1995)

=== Wind Ensemble ===
The MIT Wind Ensemble, also known as MITWE or 21M.426, is a group of instrumental performers who are students at the Massachusetts Institute of Technology. The group performs classic (such as Holst and Grainger) and contemporary wind ensemble repertoire. It also commissions many new works.

The ensemble was formed in 1999 by Dr. Frederick Harris Jr. It is led by him and Kenneth Amis, tuba player in the Empire Brass.

The ensemble performs 4 concerts per year in Kresge Auditorium. The concerts are open to the public. The ensemble also has performed with local middle school and high school bands, as part of an outreach program. The ensemble has taken two international tours: to the Dominican Republic in 2019 and to Manaus, Brazil in 2023.

Admission to the MIT Wind Ensemble is by audition only. Current players must re-audition at the beginning of every year to remain in the ensemble. The audition consists of a short piece of the student's choice, a sight reading exercise, and a chromatic scale. Undergraduate students in the ensemble may choose to take MITWE for academic credit. In this case, the student must take a short playing exam at the end of each term.

In 2002 and 2003, the ensemble recorded its first CD ("Waking Winds") featuring 4 works by Boston area composers:

- Concertino for Violin and Chamber Winds, by Peter Child
- The Congress of the Insomniacs, by Brian Robison
- Song and Dance, by Gunther Schuller
- Drill, by Evan Ziporyn

The recording sessions took place in Jordan Hall, Kresge Auditorium, and Killian Hall.

The ensemble's second CD ("Solo Eclipse") was released in 2008, featuring new works by:

- Kenneth Amis
- Ran Blake
- Guillermo Klein

The ensemble has commissioned many works for Wind Band, including pieces by Kenneth Amis, Kenny Werner, Erica Foin, Forrest Larson, Ran Blake, Guillermo Klein, Evan Ziporyn, and others.

== Publications and media ==
=== WMBR ===
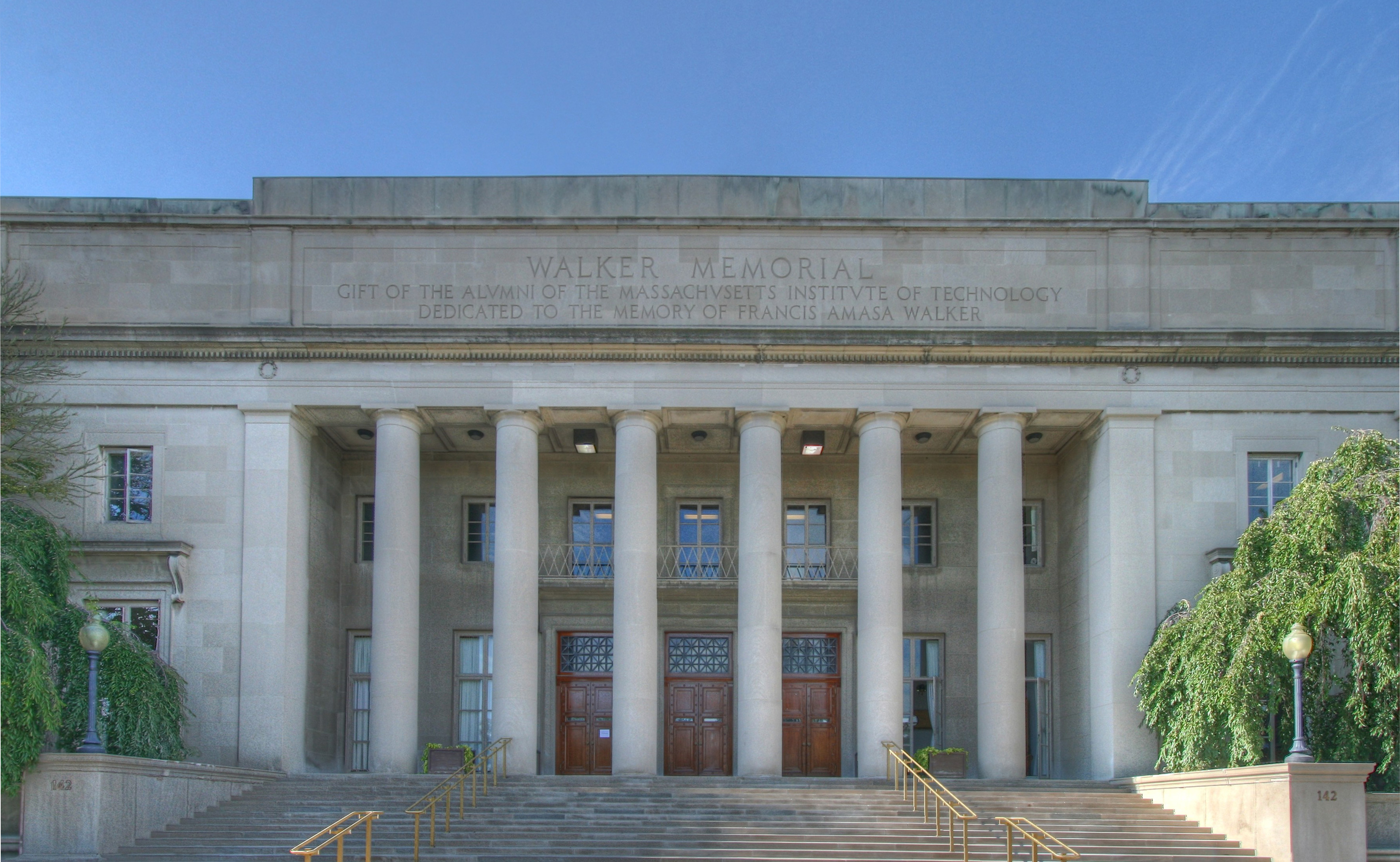
The WMBR campus radio station is located in Walker Memorial

WMBR is a student-run college radio station licensed to broadcast on 88.1 FM. Its call sign is an acronym for Walker Memorial Basement Radio, referring to the location of the radio station.

=== MIT International Review ===
The MIT International Review (MITIR) is an interdisciplinary journal of international affairs published by MIT. The aim of the publication is to "foster solution-oriented discourse about international problems.

=== The Tech ===
The Tech is MIT's student newspaper. It is published once a week on Thursdays during the academic year.

=== MIT Undergraduate Research Journal (MURJ) ===
This periodic publication reports on results from recent and ongoing Undergraduate Research Opportunity Program (UROP) projects.

=== Ergo (defunct) ===
Ergo was a student-run newspaper, based at MIT, but distributed and staffed by people from other colleges in the Boston area as well, primarily Harvard University and Boston University. It was started in 1969 as a conservative-libertarian alternative to the often socialist student activism that was prevalent at the time. It was published weekly; support came from advertising, contributions, and subscriptions; MIT provided free office space but did not otherwise support the paper.

In the next few years Ergo shifted in a more libertarian direction, and its editorial policy became more aligned with Objectivism. Content included commentary on local and national political issues, occasional analysis of more abstract philosophical issues, and reviews of books and music. The paper conducted a long-running campaign criticizing the MIT philosophy department for presenting analytic philosophy to the exclusion of other philosophical systems, and campaigned with more success against student hazing practices. It regularly covered Ayn Rand's annual talks at the Ford Hall Forum. As the core group behind Ergo graduated and drifted away, and as student activism in general declined, publication became more sporadic. It ceased publication in the 1980s. It was briefly revived in 1999. Authors for Ergo included Robert Bidinotto and (briefly) Simson Garfinkel.

== Student government ==
MIT's student body has several governing organizations. The Undergraduate Association is the primary representative body for undergraduate students while the Graduate Student Council represents the interests of graduate students. Organizations like the Interfraternity Council (IFC), Panhellenic Council (Panhel), Living Group Council (LGC), and Dormitory Council (Dormcon) are independent bodies that represent the interests of fraternities, sororities, independent living groups, and undergraduate dormitories respectively.

== Fraternities and Sororities ==
MIT has an active Greek and co-op housing system, including thirty-six fraternities, sororities, and independent living groups (FSILGs). As of 2015, 98% of all undergraduates lived in MIT-affiliated housing; 54% of the men participated in fraternities and 20% of the women were involved in sororities. Most FSILGs are located across the river in Back Bay near where MIT was founded, and there is also a cluster of fraternities on MIT's West Campus that face the Charles River Basin.

== Athletics ==
MIT has 33 varsity sports teams. Of the previous 41 varsity sports, eight (Alpine Skiing, Golf, Men's Ice Hockey, Women's Ice Hockey, Men's Gymnastics, Women's Gymnastics, Pistol, and Wrestling) were cut in 2009 for budget reasons. MIT also has an extensive club and intramural sports team.

All MIT undergraduates must complete physical education classes as well as a swim test or class as part of the General Institute Requirements (GIRs).
