= MIT Monarch B =

1980s United States human-powered aircraft

- Side profile drawing of the MIT Monarch B

General information
- Type: Human-powered aircraft
- National origin: United States
- Manufacturer: Massachusetts Institute of Technology
- Designer: Juan R. Cruz, Mark Drela, John S. Langford
- Status: On display
- Number built: 1

History
- First flight: April 4, 1984
- Retired: October 12, 1984
- Developed from: MIT Monarch A
- Developed into: MIT Light Eagle

The Monarch B was a human-powered aircraft, designed and built by graduates and undergraduates of the Massachusetts Institute of Technology, and won the £20,000 first prize for the Kremer World Speed Competition. It is a successor to the Monarch A HPA which preceded it.

== Development ==
The original Monarch HPA had been damaged in a nose-over landing on September 23, 1983. Over the winter of 1983/84, aspects of the craft were redesigned and rebuilt, in order to improve its performance. Work on these alterations commenced in December 1983, and were completed by early April 1984.

Modifications made included a new, redesigned, fuselage, with the pilot being seated in a recumbent position. The fuselage had a lower, longer profile than its predecessor had, with its trailing edge having a distinct chevron profile. Lateral control was no longer by wing warping, but was now achieved using ailerons attached to the trailing edge of the wing's outer sections. Changes were made to all three parts of the power systems; for the pilot, the gearing ratio of the chain drive changed; a new set of Ni-Cad cells, using a greater voltage, was installed; the propeller was modified to be variable pitch.

Designated the Monarch B, to distinguish it from its predecessor, the monoplane first flew on April 4, 1984, at Hanscom Field airport in Bedford, Massachusetts, with Frank Scarabino as pilot. Official attempts for the Kremer prize were made on May 3, 5, 6, and 7. On May 11, 1984, it traversed the Kremer course in an official time of 2 minutes 55 seconds, for which the MIT Monarch team were awarded the £20,000 prize.

The Monarch B made its final flight on October 12, 1984. It is now on display at the Boston Museum of Science.

== Specifications ==
Data from Jane's all the world's aircraft 1985-86

General characteristics

- Crew: 1
- Wingspan: 61 ft 6 in (18.75 m)
- Wing area: 178 sq ft (16.5 m^{2}) not including ailerons
- Aspect ratio: 21.6
- Airfoil: Lissaman 7769
- Empty weight: 67.5 lb (31 kg)
- Powerplant: 1 × electric motor , 0.94 hp (.70 kW)
- Powerplant: 1 × human power
- Propellers: 2-bladed, 10 ft (3.0 m) diameter variable pitch

Performance

- Maximum speed: 24 mph (39 km/h, 21 kn)

== See also ==
Aircraft of comparable role, configuration, and era

- Kohm Lady Godiva
- MacCready Gossamer Albatross
- MacCready Gossamer Condor
- MIT Chrysalis
- MIT Daedalus
- MIT Monarch A

Related lists

- List of human-powered aircraft
