= MIT Monarch A =

1980s United States human-powered aircraft

- Side profile drawing of the MIT Monarch A

General information
- Type: Human-powered aircraft
- National origin: United States
- Manufacturer: Massachusetts Institute of Technology
- Designer: Juan R. Cruz, Mark Drela, John S. Langford
- Number built: 1

History
- First flight: August 14, 1983
- Retired: September 23, 1983
- Developed from: MIT Chrysalis
- Developed into: MIT Monarch B

The Monarch A was a human-powered aircraft, designed and built by graduates and undergraduates of the Massachusetts Institute of Technology, with Professors Walter Hollister and Ed Crawley acting as Project Advisers. Professor Eugene Larrabee, who had been the adviser for the 1979 MIT Chrysalis HPA, also provided support.

== Development ==
The concept and general arrangement of the craft, described as an improved successor to the Chrysalis, was first detailed in the Spring 1981 issue of the AIAA Student Journal.

Development of the design was prompted in May 1983 by the announcement of the Kremer World Speed Competition. According to the rules, the first HPA to traverse a 1,500 m (4,920 ft) triangular closed course in less than 180 seconds would be awarded a £20,000 prize. Competition rules allowed for stored energy, generated by the pilot during a ten-minute period immediately preceding a flight, to be used as an additional power source. Design of the Monarch commenced in late May, with an emphasis on it winning the prize, as well as it being economical and achievable to design and build. Much of the technology used with the Chrysalis transferred over to the new craft.

The Monarch was a wire-braced high-wing monoplane of conventional configuration, and fitted with a tractor propeller. The fuselage was of the pod-and-boom type. The wing planform had a constant chord with a tapered outer section. The wing featured slight dihedral, with the outer section being set at a greater angle. The empennage featured all-flying tail surfaces, with both the fin and tailplane having an elliptical planform. The aircraft's primary structure consisted of 6061-T6 aluminum tubing, chemically milled down. The secondary structure was made using styrofoam, plywood, carbon fibre, and graphite expoxy. The entire aircraft was covered in transparent Mylar film. The undercarriage consisted of three wheels arranged in series, with the middle wheel being sprung and castering. Additionally, the middle wheel was powered during the initial part of the take-off run. Lateral control was achieved by wing warping, with directional and pitch control being achieved by the all-flying tailfin and tailplane.

The pilot sat in a conventional cycling position. During flights, the aircraft had two separate power sources, both leading to a fixed-pitch minimum induced loss propeller. One was the pilot, who used bicycle pedals to power a steel-nylon chain drive to the propeller. The other power source was a 700 W DC motor/generator, linked to a pack of 24 Ni-Cad cells. To comply with the Kremer competition, these cells could be charged by the pilot pedalling for 10 minutes, immediately prior to a prize attempt. According to its designers, both the pilot and the motor were each expected to deliver approximately equal amounts of power to the propeller.

Construction of the aircraft involved 3,600 hours of work, over an 88-day period. It first flew on August 14, 1983, at Hanscom Field airport in Bedford, Massachusetts. The flight program continued through to September 23, when it suffered a nose-over during landing, necessitating repairs. These took place over the winter of 1983/84, during which it was also partially redesigned. The new iteration was designated the Monarch B; the name Monarch A then being retrospectively applied to the original version.

== Specifications ==
Data from Jane's all the world's aircraft 1984-85

General characteristics

- Crew: 1
- Length: 26 ft 4.75 in (8.0455 m)
- Wingspan: 61 ft 6 in (18.75 m)
- Wing area: 178 sq ft (16.5 m^{2})
- Aspect ratio: 21.6
- Airfoil: Lissaman 7769
- Empty weight: 67.5 lb (31 kg)
- Powerplant: 1 × electric motor , 0.94 hp (.70 kW)
- Powerplant: 1 × human power
- Propellers: 2-bladed, 10 ft (3.0 m) diameter fixed pitch

Performance

- Maximum speed: 24 mph (39 km/h, 21 kn)

== See also ==
Aircraft of comparable role, configuration, and era

- Kohm Lady Godiva
- MacCready Gossamer Albatross
- MacCready Gossamer Condor
- MIT Chrysalis
- MIT Daedalus
- MIT Monarch B

Related lists

- List of human-powered aircraft
