= Burd =

Burd may refer to:

== Surname ==
- Clara Miller Burd (1873–1933), American stained glass designer and children's book and magazine cover illustrator
- David Burd (born 1988), American rapper and comedian known professionally as Lil Dicky
- Edward Burd (1749–1833), American Revolutionary War officer, lawyer and chief court clerk of the Pennsylvania Supreme Court
- George Burd (1793–1844), American politician
- Irina Burd, American physician and professor
- James Burd (1726–1793), colonial American soldier in the French and Indian War; father of Edward Burd
- James M. Burd (1931-2013), American politician
- Lettie Cowman (1870-1960), née Burd, American writer and cofounder of the Oriental Missionary Society
- Steven Burd (born 1949), president and chief executive officer of Safeway Inc.
- Walter Burd (1888-1939), Anglican Bishop of Saskatchewan, Canada

== Places ==
- Bürd, Övörkhangai, a district in Mongolia
- Cape Burd, Antarctic Peninsula
- Redstone Old Fort, built in 1759 by Colonel James Burd and briefly named Fort Burd

== Other uses ==
- Bashshar ibn Burd (714-784), Persian poet
- Burd Ellen, a character in the ballad Burd Ellen and Young Tamlane
- Burd Ellen, a character in the fairy tale "Childe Rowland"
- Burd Isobel, a character in the folk song "Burd Isabel and Earl Patrick"
- MIT BURD, a 1970s human-powered aircraft
- MIT BURD II, a 1970s human-powered aircraft

== See also ==
- Bird (disambiguation)
- Byrd (disambiguation)
