= Airglow (aircraft) =

- Airglow competing at the Icarus Cup at Lasham

General information
- Type: Human powered aircraft
- National origin: United Kingdom
- Manufacturer: John and Mark McIntyre
- Status: Still flying
- Number built: 1

History
- First flight: 1990

Airglow is a pedal-driven human-powered aircraft. It was designed and developed by brothers John and Mark McIntyre of Cambridgeshire, England.

== Development ==
John McIntyre holds a marine engineering degree, and Mark McIntyre is an artist designer engineer & professional model-builder, both brothers were keen aero-modelers and had a history of building creative contraptions including a sail-propelled-bicycle and a hot-air-balloon which carried a camera. Work on Airglow began after John accompanied Daedalus on its epic flight. Airglow was built over a three-year period to exacting standards; any part not perfect was scrapped and re-built. Testament to this is the fact that Airglow is one of the lightest HPA ever built, and has had a flying life longer than any other. Airglow took longer to build than was expected, in John's words "We thought that if Dr Who could build a trans-dimensional flux damper in less than one episode that what we wanted to do would be simple"

Unlike many HPA builders Airglow wasn't built to break records or win Kremer prizes. John states that it was built 'for delight' and because 'it's fun to make things'.

Airglow first flew at 6 am on 20 July 1990 at Duxford Airfield, England. The pilot was seventeen-year-old Nick Weston. Airglow's first performance was impressive, the aircraft flew on only the 2nd attempt, and by the end of the day had managed three more flights, the longest being about a quarter of a mile.

Over the next five years Airglow made between 50 and 100 flights with no accidents. Typical flights would be the length of the runway, the longest flight was about 2 miles long. In 1992 Airglow was taken to Germany and flown by Peer Frank (designer of Velair 88 and Velair 89) at the Grob airfield at Mindelheim.

Pressure of work meant that after 1995 Airglow rarely flew. In 2010 it was passed on to the Royal Aeronautical Society.

== Specifications ==
General characteristics

- Crew: one
- Wingspan: 31.7 m (104 ft 0 in)
- Empty weight: 37 kg (82 lb) useful load 88 kg

Performance

- Maximum speed: 38 km/h (24 mph, 21 kn)
- Useful load: 88 kg (194 lb)

== Design ==
Airglow is a conventionally configured aircraft, the main wing forward, tail and elevator at the back, with a 'pusher' prop situated about a quarter of the way down the tail boom. The pilot sits recumbent in a streamlined nacelle with an open side to provide cooling. The drive mechanism is a combination of pedals, a gearbox, drive shafts and chains, powering a 2.95 meter two-bladed propeller mounted concentrically with the boom.

Airglow was designed with an all-flying rudder and elevator for yaw and pitch, plus rotating wing tips for lateral stability. The aircraft employs a simple fly-by-wire control system based on lightweight control servos more normally found on radio controlled model aircraft. The rotating wingtips had limited success, and have since been fixed in a single position. The aircraft now relies on the rudder alone for turning, lateral stability is provided for by increased wing dihedral.

Power requirements vary from about 450-500 watts on take-off to about 275-300 watts for sustained flight. Power requirements increase noticeably in anything other than nil-wind conditions.

== Current status ==
After an over a year in the custodianship of the Royal Aeronautical Society Airglow was brought out of retirement in 2011 and passed on to P&M Aviation. Despite being left for several years in a shed in the bottom of a garden the aircraft required little more than some oil on the moving parts before being flown again on 29 September at Kemble by Robin Kraike of P&M Aviation and Dr Bill Brookes from the Human Powered Flight Group of the Royal Aeronautical Society.

Airglow flew at Lasham airfield on 13 November 2011 as part of the 50th Anniversary celebrations of Derek Piggott's pioneering HPA flight in SUMPAC.

== Icarus Cup ==
In August 2012 Airglow competed in the Icarus Cup at Lasham airfield against 4 other HPA. Flying in a number of events including duration, slalom, speed, un-assisted take-off and precision landing Airglow won most of the individual events and the overall competition. During the competition airglow achieved flights of well over a kilometer at speeds approaching 9 m/s. These flights were only brought to an end when the pilots ran out of airfield.

== Ongoing development ==
Airglow is currently being worked on by a small team of pilots and engineers using Airglow as a flying test bed for HPA improvements. Airglow's modular design allows refinement of different sections of the aircraft (propeller, rudder, elevator, drive chain, wings etc.) without requiring major work to the rest of the aircraft.

== See also ==
Aircraft of comparable role, configuration, and era

- SUMPAC
- Gossamer Condor
- Gossamer Albatross
- MIT Daedalus
