= Juan R. Cruz =

Puerto Rican scientist

- Born: January 5, 1946 (age 80); Manatí, Puerto Rico
- Occupation: aerospace engineer

Juan R. Cruz (born January 5, 1946) is a Puerto Rican aerospace engineer who played an instrumental role in the design and development of the Mars Exploration Rover (MER) and Mars Science Laboratory (MSL) parachute.

== Early years ==
Cruz was born and raised in Puerto Rico. After earning a B.S. (Bachelor of Science) in Aeronautics and Astronautics from the Massachusetts Institute of Technology, he briefly worked at Beech Aircraft Corporation in Wichita, KS; he then went on to earn a Ph.D. from Virginia Tech in aerospace engineering. During his years at MIT he was involved with the Monarch and Daedalus human powered aircraft teams.

== Career in NASA ==
Cruz is a senior aerospace engineer in the Exploration Systems Engineering Branch at the NASA Langley Research Center in Hampton, Virginia. His responsibilities are focused on research and development of entry, descent, and landing (EDL) systems for robotic and human exploration missions. He was a member of the highly successful Mars Exploration Rover (MER) and Mars Science laboratory (MSL) projects that placed rovers on the surface of Mars in 2004 and 2012. His contributions to the MER and MSL projects centered on the design and qualification of the supersonic parachute. In October, 2004 he was among a group of scientists who received an "Exceptional Achievement Award", from NASA.

== Mars Exploration Rover mission ==
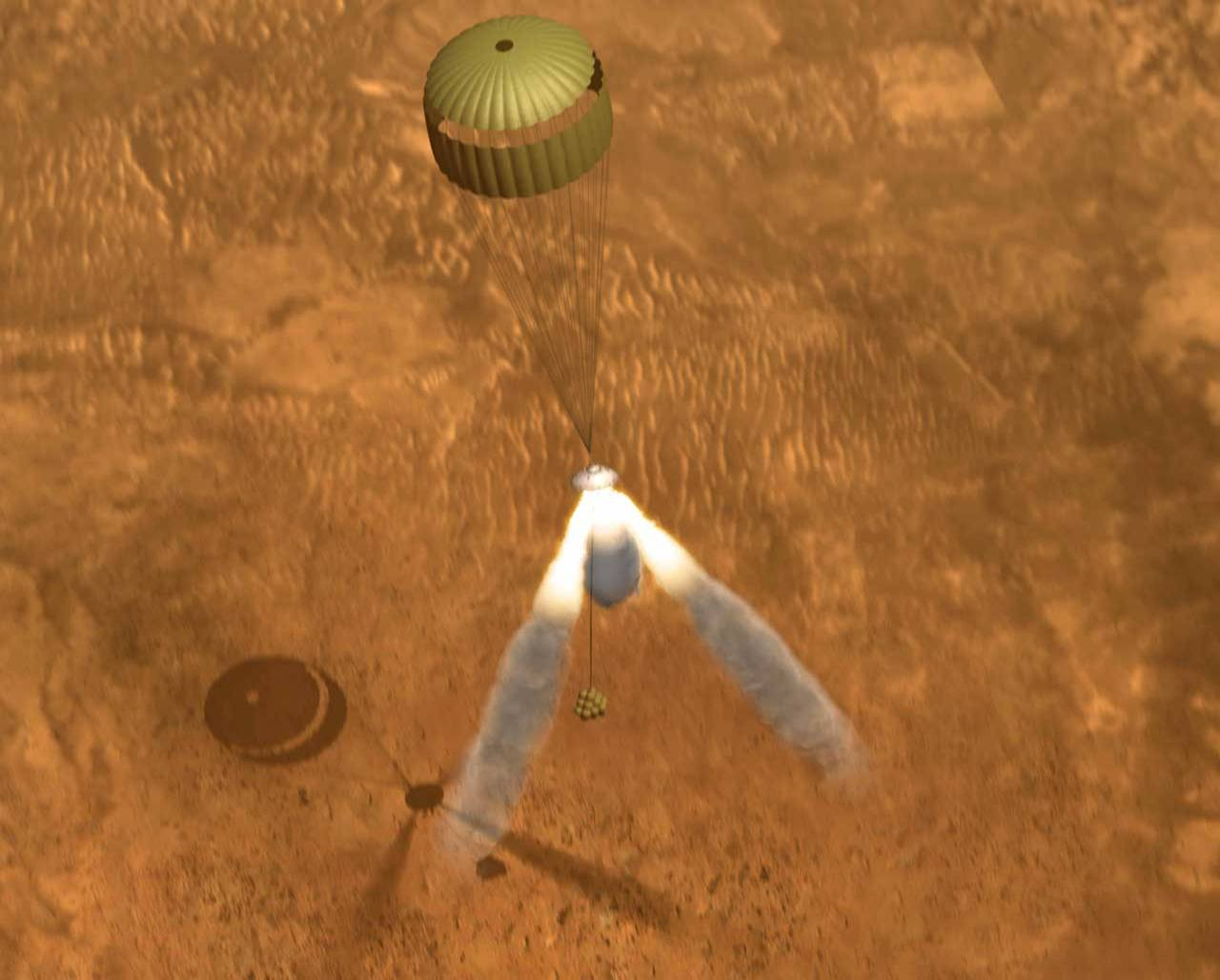
Descent is slowed by parachute.

The MER-A rover, Spirit, was launched on June 10, 2003, at 17:59 UTC, and MER-B, Opportunity, on July 7, 2003. Spirit landed in Gusev crater on January 4, 2004, and Opportunity landed in the Meridiani Planum on the opposite side of Mars from Spirit, on January 25, 2004. Cruz was among the scientists from Langley who helped develop the parachute which helped slow the spacecraft during entry, descent and landing.

According to Cruz:

There are challenges to testing these parachutes because we can not test it at exactly the right conditions. Earth's atmosphere is the one we have to work with and the Martian atmosphere is very different, so you have to make adjustments in how you test the parachute. Another issue is the wind tunnel models we used in our tests were ten-percent scale models, about five feet in diameter.

Cruz is also a member of the Phoenix (Mars 2007), Mars Science Laboratory (Mars 2011), and Crew Exploration Vehicle EDL teams. He has undertaken research on advanced missions to Mars, including robotic airplanes, as well as having been a technical reviewer for the Genesis, Huygens, and Stardust missions. Prior to his involvement with exploration programs he conducted research on high-altitude unmanned aircraft.
