= PSU Zephyrus =

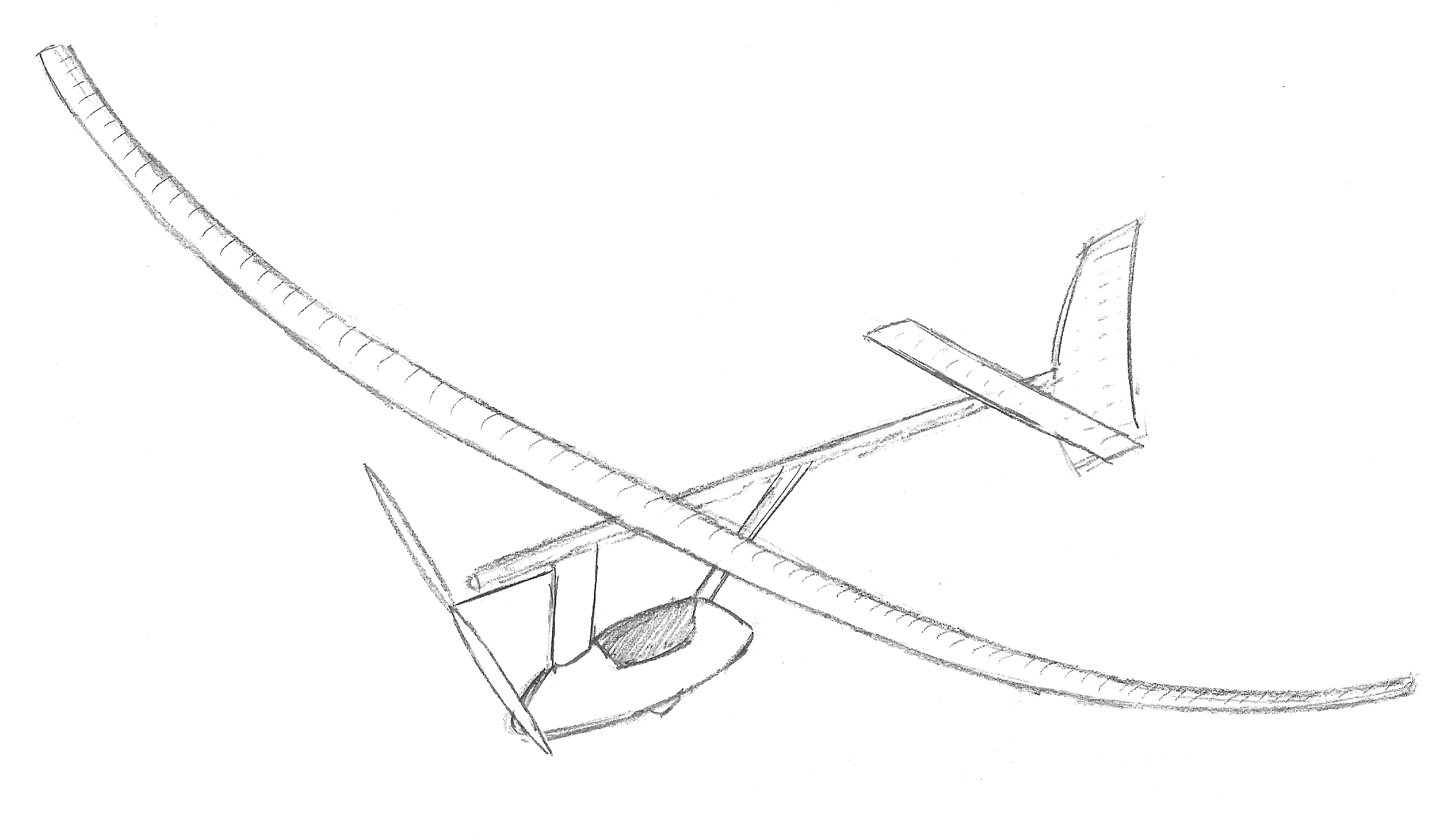
- An isometric concept view of the aircraft.

General information
- Type: Human-powered aircraft
- Manufacturer: Penn State
- Number built: 0 (1 in progress)

History
- Developed from: Musculair II

The PSU Zephyrus is a human-powered aircraft being constructed by the Penn State AERSP 2/404H team. It is a composite material, single-seat, single propeller, high-wing airplane. The Zephyrus is designed to compete in the Kremer prize sport competition.

It flew its first flight on April 25, 2011, at Mifflin County Airport. The project, led by aerospace engineering professor Mark Maughmer and graduate student Julia Cole, had existed for several years, pursuing the design and development of a human-powered aircraft (HPA) to compete for the Kremer International Sporting Aircraft Prize.

== Development ==
The Penn State AESRP 2/404H team, also known as the Sailplane Class, was introduced to the Kremer Prize in the spring of 2007.Because of the class’s history with composites and light aircraft structures, it was uniquely qualified to pursue the prize, Cole said.

The basic mission goal is to traverse an equilateral triangle with sides of 500 meters once in each direction in seven minutes. The competition specifies a minimum average airspeed of 5 m/s during the flight. In addition, for a flight to be considered official, the airspeed cannot drop below 5 m/s for a period of more than 20 seconds. The aircraft is also being developed and constructed as a fulfillment of the course requirements of Penn State's AERSP 404H course.

== Design ==
=== Fuselage ===
The fuselage was sized based a dimension range of a 5’10”(1.78 m) pilot and the assumption that the pilot could output the necessary power-to-weight ratio to fly the aircraft will be no greater than 1.78 m. Constraints include minimum widths for pilot comfort and desired center of gravity of the aircraft. The shape of the pod was designed to be a low-drag body that will not generate lift regardless of angle of attack. The length of the shape was reduced to allow for aircraft maneuverability in crosswind. The internal structural members are designed to firmly hold the seat configuration in place, yet still provide a maximum field of vision for the pilot. Structural members attach to the main boom at a hard-point located behind the trailing edge of the wing.

=== Propeller ===
To successfully complete the challenge, it was determined that the propeller would need to produce 27.5 N of thrust when cruising at 11.5 m/s and spinning at 135 rpm. To meet these requirements, the propeller design underwent many alterations, with the final design broken into two components.

=== Wing ===
Starting from a parent aircraft approach, primarily using the Musculair 1 and 2, but also including the Monarch B, MIT Daedalus, and Velair models, a first iteration choice for an airfoil was made. A modified version of the FX-76MP, as used for the Musculair 2 was chosen. Taking characteristics from this airfoil, using an initial weight buildup, the wing planform size was determined. Then, assuming a take-off weight of 81 kg (27 kg empty weight), sea-level air density, and using a CL at cruise of 0.8.

=== Control Surfaces ===
Ailerons were designed as a piano hinge attached near the upper surface, so the upper surface incorporates the leading edge radius, so that the upper surface maintains smooth flow. This design maximizes weight efficiency and construction ease.

== Specifications ==
General characteristics

- Crew: 1
- Length: 13 ft 1 in (4.0 m)
- Wingspan: 74 ft 0 in (17.5 m)
- Height: 9 ft 4 in (3.0 m)
- Empty weight: 56.6 lb (25.7 kg)
- Max takeoff weight: 206 lb (93.4 kg)
- Powerplant: 1 × Tractor propeller

Performance

- Cruise speed: 12.5 mph (27.9 km/h, 10.9 kn)

== See also ==
Related development

- Kremer prize
- Human-powered aircraft

Aircraft of comparable role, configuration, and era

- MIT Daedalus
- Gossamer Albatross
- Gossamer Condor
