= McCollin =

McCollin is a surname. Notable people with the surname include:

- Andre McCollin (born 1985), English footballer
- Frances McCollin (1892–1960), American composer and musician
- Kalifa McCollin (born 1995), netball player from Trinidad and Tobago

== See also ==
- McCallin
