= Frederick Harris (conductor) =

American conductor

Frederick Harris, Jr. is the conductor of the MIT Wind Ensemble. In 1999, he formed the ensemble at MIT. Harris is also the director of MIT's Festival Jazz Ensemble.

He was born in New Hampshire and earned a master's degree from the New England Conservatory of Music. His teachers have included Frank Battisti, Gunther Schuller, and Craig Kirchhoff. He earned his PhD from the University of Minnesota. He has served as guest conductor of the New Hampshire Philharmonic Orchestra, and also conducted during summers at Tanglewood.

Harris has commissioned more than 52 new pieces for various ensembles. He also brings musicians to MIT to play and work with his ensembles, including greats such as Ran Blake, Herb Pomeroy, Arni Cheatham, John Funkhouser, John Harbison, and Mark Harvey.

Harris has written the official biography of Stanislaw Skrowaczewski.

He lives in Boxborough, MA, with his wife, Becky, and their daughters, Abbie and Sadie
