= MIT BURD =

1970s United States human-powered aircraft

General information
- Type: Human-powered aircraft
- National origin: United States
- Manufacturer: Massachusetts Institute of Technology
- Designer: Paul Hooper
- Number built: 1

History
- Developed into: MIT BURD II

The BURD was a two-place human-powered biplane, designed and built by graduates and undergraduates of the Massachusetts Institute of Technology, with Professors Eugene Covert and James Mar acting as project advisers. It was developed with the specific goal of winning the £50,000 Kremer prize then on offer.

BURD is an acronym for "Biplane Ultralight Research Device", reflecting the aircraft's configuration. The project was notable for it involving computational analysis as well as wind-tunnel tests of a scale model. The two-person option was adopted, as that allowed for a better power-to-weight ratio. The canard configuration was selected due that giving a beneficial increase in lift. The biplane configuration, fitted with endplates, was adopted due to the aerodynamic and structural benefits from using that arrangement.

The primary structure for the fuselage was made from aluminum tubing, while the primary structure for the flying surfaces were box-beam spars made from sheet balsa. The secondary structure was made primarily from balsa, with aluminum tubing and sheets used in high-stress areas. The entire airframe was covered in transparent film. The undercarriage consisted of two bicycle wheels, arranged in tandem. As originally built, the front wheel was fixed, and not able to be steered. The two-person crew sat in a tandem arrangement, and powered a chain drive which connected to both the rear undercarriage wheel and the rear-mounted pusher propeller. Pitch control was to be achieved by pivoting the foreplane in its entirety. Lateral and directional control was to be attained by spoilers mounted on the lower wing, with the spoilers producing a yawing force in the direction of the turn that the aircraft was being banked towards. In addition, a vertical fin was located above the upper wing.

The BURD was completed in May 1973. Taxiing tests conducted at Hanscom Field airport in Bedford, Massachusetts, revealed significant design and construction issues. Alterations were made to the undercarriage, the drive system, and to the controls for both the foreplane and the spoilers. In 1975, the first flight attempt took place, but ended with an almost complete structural collapse of the aircraft.

In 1976, a new iteration of the design, named the MIT BURD II, was built, with this craft incorporating a number of detail changes from the original.

== Specifications ==
Data from The M.I.T. Man-Powered Aircraft and Man-powered aircraft

General characteristics

- Crew: 2
- Length: 27 ft (8.2 m)
- Wingspan: 62 ft (19 m)
- Height: 15 ft (4.6 m)
- Wing area: 640 sq ft (59 m^{2}) plus 60 sq ft (5.60 m^{2}) canard wing area
- Airfoil: Wortmann FX61-163
- Empty weight: 128 lb (58 kg)
- Gross weight: 400 lb (181 kg)
- Propellers: 2-bladed, 10 ft (3.0 m) diameter

Performance

- Maximum speed: 17.75 mph (28.57 km/h, 15.42 kn)
- Wing loading: 0.66 lb/sq ft (3.2 kg/m^{2})

== See also ==
Aircraft of comparable role, configuration, and era

- Kohm Lady Godiva
- MacCready Gossamer Albatross
- MacCready Gossamer Condor
- MIT BURD II
- MIT Chrysalis
- MIT Daedalus

Related lists

- List of human-powered aircraft
