= MIT BURD II =

1970s United States human-powered aircraft

General information
- Type: Human-powered aircraft
- National origin: United States
- Manufacturer: Massachusetts Institute of Technology
- Designer: Paul Hooper
- Number built: 1

History
- Developed from: MIT BURD

The BURD II was a two-place human-powered biplane, designed and built by graduates and undergraduates of the Massachusetts Institute of Technology. It is very similar to the original BURD, which suffered a structural collapse during testing in 1975, but incorporated changes to its structure and its control systems.

== Background ==
Construction of the BURD II began in June 1976 and was completed by September of that year. It differed from the original BURD in several ways. While the wing spars of the original craft were box-beams made from balsa, for the new airplane they were made from carbon fiber. The secondary structure, in addition to balsa, incorporated new materials, such as polystyrene, carbon fiber, and bamboo. The undercarriage's rear wheel was fitted with a shock-absorber. For the control system, changes made included the foreplane being held in a neutral position by bungee cords and, for yaw control, spoilers being fitted to the wingtip endplates, in addition to those located on the lower wing. Further changes included the fuselage having a full frontal fairing, and the central vertical fin, located above the upper wing, being redesigned so that it had a new profile.

Flight attempts with the BURD proved unsuccessful and, when the £50,000 Kremer prize was won in August 1977, interest in the project waned. In October 1978, four MIT undergraduates (all members of the MIT Rocket Society) were given access to the BURD II, with the intention of modifying the craft so that it could be made to fly. In November, two model aircraft engines, rated at 1.50 hp (1.1 kW), powering 12 in (30.5 cm) propellers, were fitted on either side of the fuselage. A series of taxiing trials, which continued through to late November, were conducted. On the last test, with Harold Youngren acting as pilot, and also pedalling, the BURD II reached takeoff speed, at which point the foreplane collapsed and the craft veered off course, causing further structural damage.

After that event, the aircraft was dismantled. Subsequent analysis by MIT graduate Bob Parks determined that the BURD design had fundamental deficiencies in its engineering, with its center of gravity being too far forward, and the wings' box-spars and wire trussing also being inadequate for the task.

== Specifications ==
Data from Jane's all the world's aircraft 1976–77

General characteristics

- Crew: 2
- Length: 26 ft 6 in (8.08 m)
- Wingspan: 62 ft (19 m)
- Height: 13 ft 4 in (4.06 m)
- Wing area: 640 sq ft (59 m^{2}) plus 66 sq ft (6.13 m^{2}) canard wing area
- Airfoil: Wortmann FX61-164
- Empty weight: 126 lb (57 kg)
- Max takeoff weight: 440 lb (200 kg)
- Propellers: 2-bladed, 10 ft (3.0 m) diameter

Performance

- Maximum speed: 19 mph (31 km/h, 17 kn)
- Cruise speed: 17 mph (27 km/h, 15 kn)
- Stall speed: 13.5 mph (21.7 km/h, 11.7 kn)
- Never exceed speed: 20.5 mph (33.0 km/h, 17.8 kn)
- Wing loading: 0.69 lb/sq ft (3.4 kg/m^{2})

== See also ==
Aircraft of comparable role, configuration, and era

- Kohm Lady Godiva
- MacCready Gossamer Albatross
- MacCready Gossamer Condor
- MIT BURD
- MIT Chrysalis
- MIT Daedalus

Related lists

- List of human-powered aircraft
