= McCallin =

McCallin is a surname. Notable people with the surname include:

- Andy McCallin, Irish hurler and Gaelic footballer
- Clement McCallin (1913–1977), English actor
- Lois McCallin (born 1958), American aviator
- Shona McCallin (born 1992), English field hockey player
- William McCallin (1842–1904), American mayor
