= Aphrodite Project =

Matchmaking event

- Founded: 2019; 7 years ago
- Area served: Canada, Hong Kong, Singapore, United States
- Industry: Matchmaking, Internet
- Website: https://aphrodite.global/

The Aphrodite Project is an annual matchmaking event that takes place on university campuses in Canada, Hong Kong, Singapore, and the United States.

== History ==
Founded in 2019, the platform started out as a psychology and economics experiment at the National University of Singapore inspired by papers in relationship science as well as the 1962 Gale-Shapley stable matching algorithm by David Gale and Lloyd Shapley to the stable marriage problem. Within a few days from launch, the platform immediately received over 1,000 student sign-ups.

The platform later expanded to the University of Waterloo and the University of Toronto for Valentine's day in 2020.

During the 2020 pandemic, the team conducted with a one-off blind experiment with an expanded psychology questionnaire of over 150 questions on thousands of students with the advice of psychology researchers Professor Geoff McDonald and Julie Cachia, a Ph.D. candidate in affective science at Stanford University to empirically improve the algorithm and questionnaire.

Over the pandemic and through 2022, the platform rapidly expanded to more universities in Canada, Hong Kong, Singapore, and the United States, including MIT, Harvard University, Carnegie Mellon University, Nanyang Technological University, Singapore Management University, Hong Kong University, and the University of British Columbia.

As of 2024, the platform has connected 85,753 people with at least six marriages since its beginnings.

== Reception ==
In 2021, Harvard economics professor Dr. Scott D. Kominers stated that the Gale-Shapley algorithm is "great" for a one-time matchmaking service like the Aphrodite Project but leaves room for error in how the project ranks each participant's prospective match. "The algorithm requires the assumption that agents have strict preferences over prospective partners," he says. This assumption means that the Aphrodite Project must use participants' responses about their own lives and carefully extrapolate to help rank participants' possible matches.

The Harvard Crimson published an article highlighting that the project "is very intentional compared to some of the other matching platforms, particularly because of the psychology research that goes into the questionnaire". However, it highlighted concerns with options for dealbreaker exclusions on the basis of race that the project defended as they "do not wish for anyone to feel the pain of outright rejection due to any aspect of their own identity". Carnegie Mellon University's The Tartan highlighted the lower risk of rejection of the platform and the platform's design for people to "come as they are".

In 2024, Singapore's The Straits Times highlighted positive interview experiences from student participants, the platform's alternative to dating apps on the market that are subject to swipe fatigue, and the at least four marriages that resulted from the platform since 2019. However, the article also noted that some participants still sometimes face being ghosted by their match.
