= MIT Chrysalis =

1970s United States human-powered aircraft

General information
- Type: Human-powered aircraft
- National origin: United States
- Manufacturer: Massachusetts Institute of Technology
- Designer: Bob Parks, Harold Youngren
- Number built: 1

History
- First flight: June 5, 1979
- Retired: September, 1979

The Chrysalis was a human-powered biplane, designed and built by graduates and undergraduates of the Massachusetts Institute of Technology, with Professor Eugene Larabee acting as Project Adviser. MIT had previously built two HPAs, the BURD and BURD II, both of which were unsuccessful.

Design work began in late 1978, with a 1/8th scale flying model being built to verify aspects of the design. The Chrysalis was a biplane of conventional configuration, fitted with a tractor propeller. The biplane's wire-braced wings were unstaggered, and the outboard panels of the lower wing were set with a 6° dihedral. The fuselage was of the pod-and-boom type. The aircraft had a primary structure of aluminum tubing, and a secondary structure made of styrofoam, balsa, and carbon fibre. The entire aircraft was covered in transparent Mylar film. The undercarriage had a single, castoring, monowheel. Lateral control was achieved by wing warping, with directional and pitch control being achieved by the all-flying tailfin and tailplane.

Construction of the aircraft took 91 days, and involved 20 people and 3,500 hours of work. It first flew on June 5, 1979, at Hanscom Field airport in Bedford, Massachusetts with designer Harold Youngren piloting the craft. Between then and its dismantling in September, the Chrysalis made a total of 345 flights, with 44 different pilots.

The Chrysalis was notable for being the first aircraft to use a 'minimum induced loss' propeller, the design of which was based on the work of Professor Eugene Larrabee. The MIT team also built the propeller used by the MacCready Gossamer Albatross.

== Specifications ==
Data from Jane's all the world's aircraft 1981-2, and Popular Mechanics

General characteristics

- Crew: 1
- Length: 39 ft (12 m)
- Wingspan: 72 ft (22 m)
- Wing area: 748 sq ft (69.5 m^{2})
- Airfoil: Lissaman 7769
- Empty weight: 93 lb (42 kg)
- Gross weight: 213–293 lb (97–133 kg) depending on pilot weight
- Propellers: 2-bladed, 14 ft (4.3 m) diameter

Performance

- Wing loading: 0.28–0.39 lb/sq ft (1.4–1.9 kg/m^{2}) depending on pilot weight

== See also ==
Aircraft of comparable role, configuration, and era

- Kohm Lady Godiva
- MacCready Gossamer Albatross
- MacCready Gossamer Condor
- MIT BURD
- MIT BURD II
- MIT Monarch A
- MIT Daedalus

Related lists

- List of human-powered aircraft
