= Lois McCallin =

American aviator (born 1956)

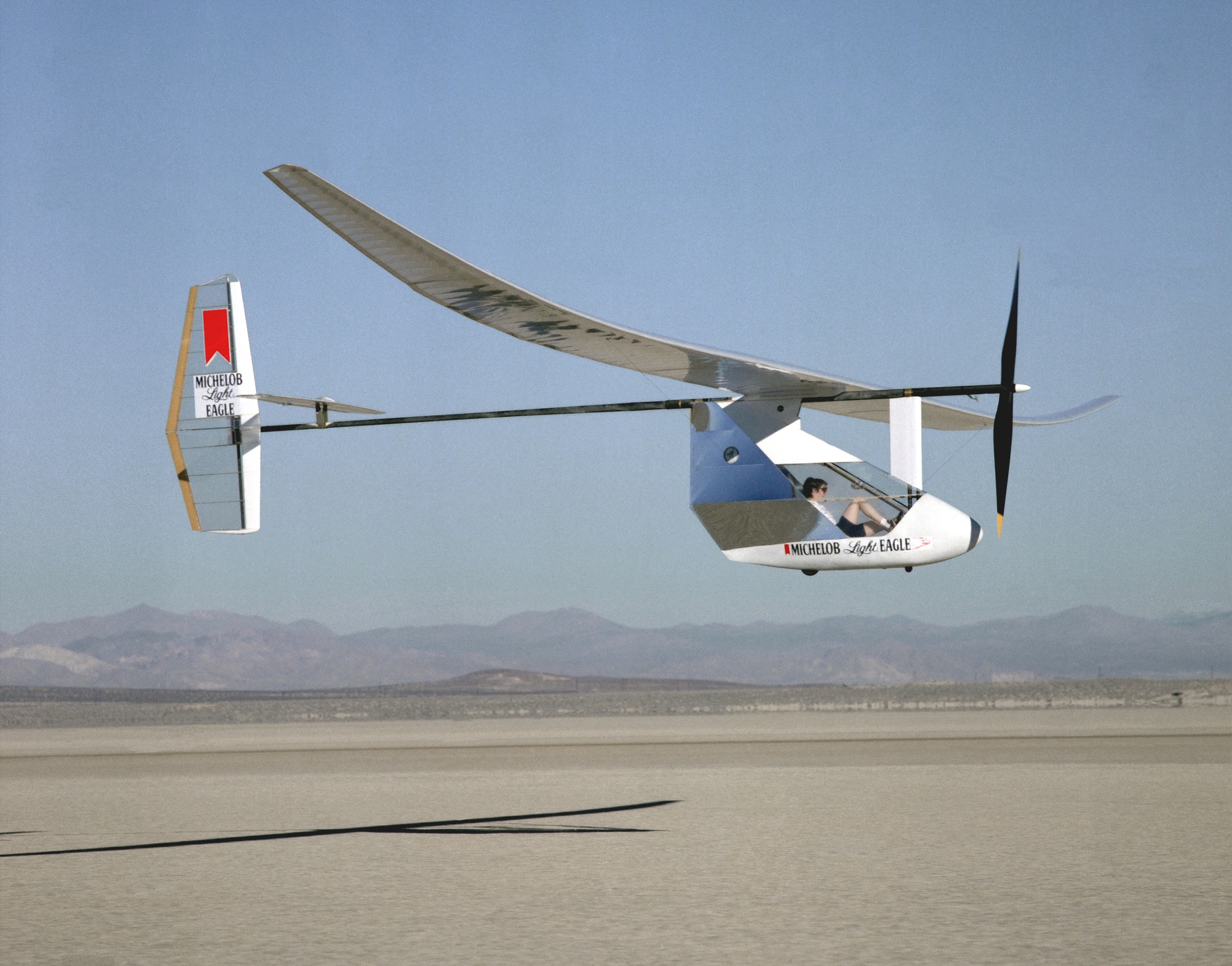
Michelob Light Eagle in flight over Rogers Dry Lake at the NASA Dryden Flight Research Center, Edwards, California.

Lois McCallin (born c. 1956) holds the world record distance and endurance for female human powered flight.

On January 21, 1987 McCallin, an amateur triathlete flew 15.44 kilometers in 37 minutes, 38 seconds in the MIT Daedalus project's human-powered Michelob Light Eagle aircraft at Roger Dry lake, Edwards Air Force Base, California. For this achievement, she was awarded the Harmon Trophy.
