= John Langford (engineer) =

Dr. John S. Langford is the Founder and CEO of Electra.aero, a startup developing hybrid electric aircraft for regional mobility, flying the Electra EL-2 Goldfinch as a demonstrator. He managed the MIT Daedalus human powered aircraft project while he was a student at MIT. He founded Aurora Flight Sciences in 1989. He was elected President of the American Institute of Aeronautics and Astronautics (AIAA) in April 2017.

== Education and career ==
Langford received his Ph.D. from MIT in the field of aeronautics and public policy. He also received Bachelor and Master of Science degrees in aeronautics and astronautics and a Master of Science in defense policy and arms control from MIT.

He founded Aurora Flight Sciences in 1989 in order to design and manufacture high altitude UAVs that could be used for global climate change research, and was its President and C.E.O. In 2004, Langford received Virginia’s Outstanding Industrialist award for his contribution to business development in Virginia.

In April 2017, John Langford was elected President of the American Institute of Aeronautics and Astronautics (AIAA). Aurora Flight Sciences was sold to Boeing in 2017. In 2018, he was elected a member of the National Academy of Engineering for the application of autonomy and robotics to the design, development, production, and operation of advanced aircraft.

== See also ==
- Estes Industries
