= Mark Drela =

American aeronautical engineer

Mark Drela (July 1, 1959) is an American aeronautical engineer, currently the Professor of Fluid Dynamics at the Massachusetts Institute of Technology and an Elected Honorary Fellow of the American Institute of Aeronautics and Astronautics. He is primarily concerned with computational engineering, design, and optimization. Drela is famed for his work on aerodynamics software:

- XFOIL for airfoil analysis and design using a panel method coupled to a boundary layer method
- Athena Vortex Lattice (AVL) for flight dynamic analysis using a vortex lattice method
- MISES for design and analysis of turbo machinery blading

In 2009, Drela was elected as a member into the National Academy of Engineering for creation of breakthrough aircraft designs and design software that enabled operation in new flight regimes.
