= Human-powered aircraft =

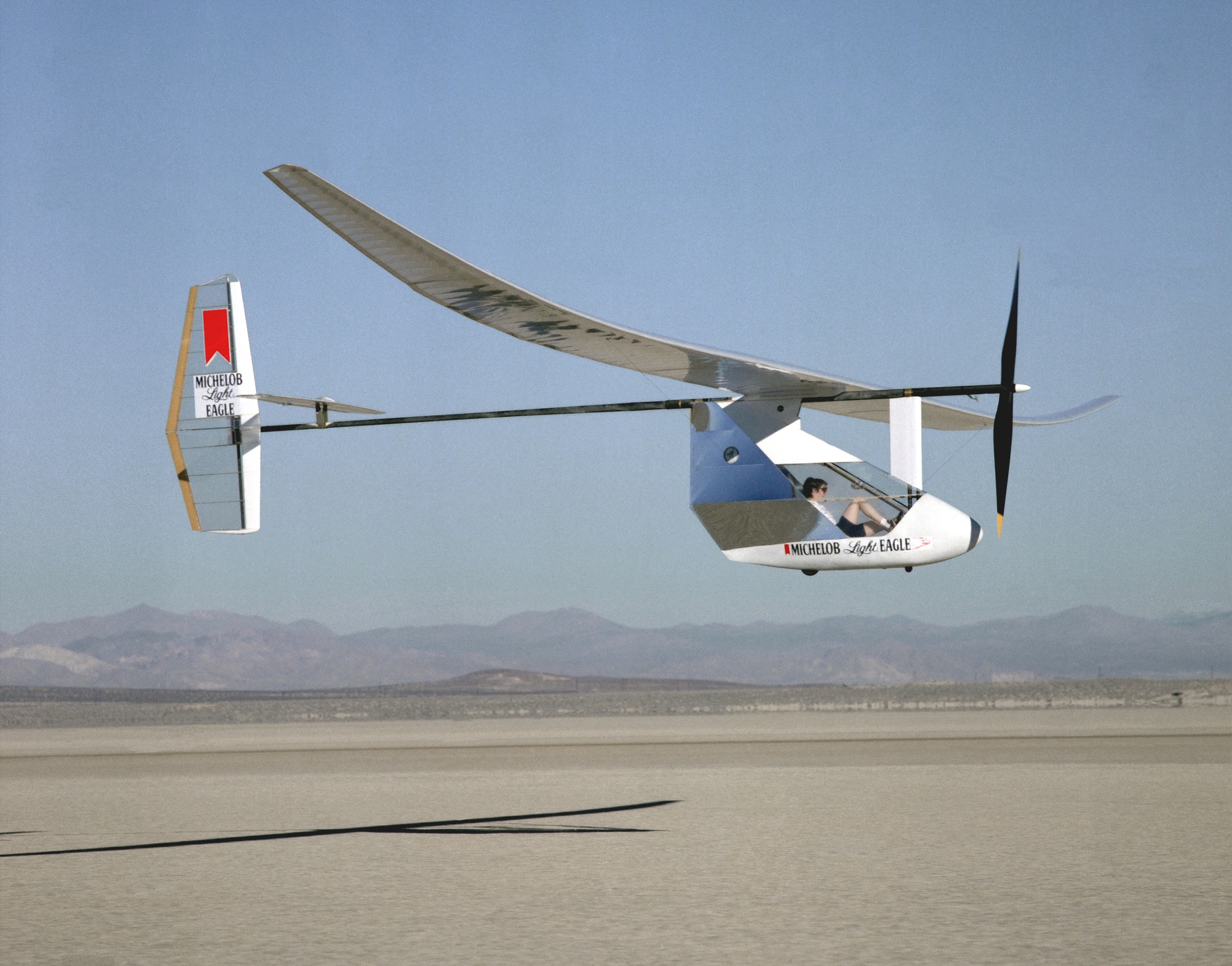
MIT Light Eagle human-powered aircraft, predecessor to the MIT Daedalus aircraft

A human-powered aircraft (HPA) is an aircraft belonging to the class of vehicles known as human-powered transport.

As its name suggests, HPAs have the pilot not only steer, but also power the aircraft with a system similar to a bicycle. A pair of pedals, moved by the pilot's feet, is connected to a propeller, or in the case of earlier prototypes, an ornithopter mechanism, which powers the aircraft.

Often, a hybrid system is used, where sometimes the pedals would charge a battery, which would, at the push of a button, power an electric motor that is connected to the propeller.

Human-powered aircraft have been successfully flown over considerable distances. However, they are still primarily constructed as engineering challenges rather than for any kind of recreational or utilitarian purpose.

== History ==
Early attempts at human-powered flight were unsuccessful because of the difficulty of achieving the high power-to-weight ratio. Prototypes often used ornithopter principles which were not only too heavy to meet this requirement but aerodynamically unsatisfactory.

=== First attempts ===
In 1904, Scientific American published an article and a photograph of a bicycle plane built by Steward Winslow of Riparia, Washington. He attempted to fly his plane on 30 July 1904, but one of the wheels failed.

An early human-powered aircraft was the Gerhardt Cycleplane, developed by W. Frederick Gerhardt at McCook Field in Dayton, Ohio in 1923. Its only human-powered takeoff was a short hop of 6 metres (20 ft) with the craft rising 60 centimetres (2 ft).

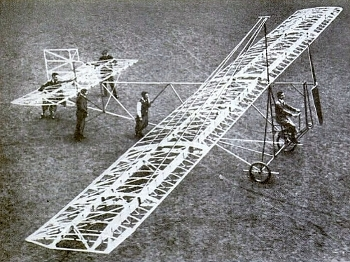
Zaschka's Human-Power Aircraft, Berlin 1934

In 1934, Engelbert Zaschka from Germany completed a large human-powered aircraft, the Zaschka Human-Power Aircraft. On 11 July 1934, the Zaschka-HPA flew about 20 metres (70 ft) on the Berlin Tempelhof Airport; the HPA took off without assisted takeoff.

A craft called HV-1 Mufli (Muskelkraft-Flugzeug) built by Helmut Hässler and Franz Villinger first flew on 30 August 1935: a distance of 235 metres (771 ft) at Halle an der Saale. A total of 120 flights were made, the longest being 712 metres (2,336 ft) in 1937. However, it was launched using a tensioned cable and so was not strictly human-powered.

In March 1937, a team of Enea Bossi (designer), Vittorio Bonomi (builder), and Emilio Casco (pilot) met a challenge by the Italian government for a flight of 1 kilometre (3,300 ft) using their Pedaliante. The aircraft apparently flew short distances fully under human power, but the distances were not significant enough to win the competition's prize. Furthermore, there has been much dispute whether it ever took off under the pedal-power of the pilot alone, in particular because there is no record of official observation of it having done so. Some arguments for and against the validity of Bossi's claim to have done so are presented by Keith Sherwin (1976). At the time the fully human-powered flights were deemed to be a result of the pilot's significant strength and endurance; and ultimately not attainable by a typical human. As with the HV-1 Mufli, additional attempts were therefore made using a catapult system. By being catapulted to a height of 9 metres (30 ft), the aircraft met the distance requirement of one kilometre but was declined the prize due to the launch method.

=== First flights ===
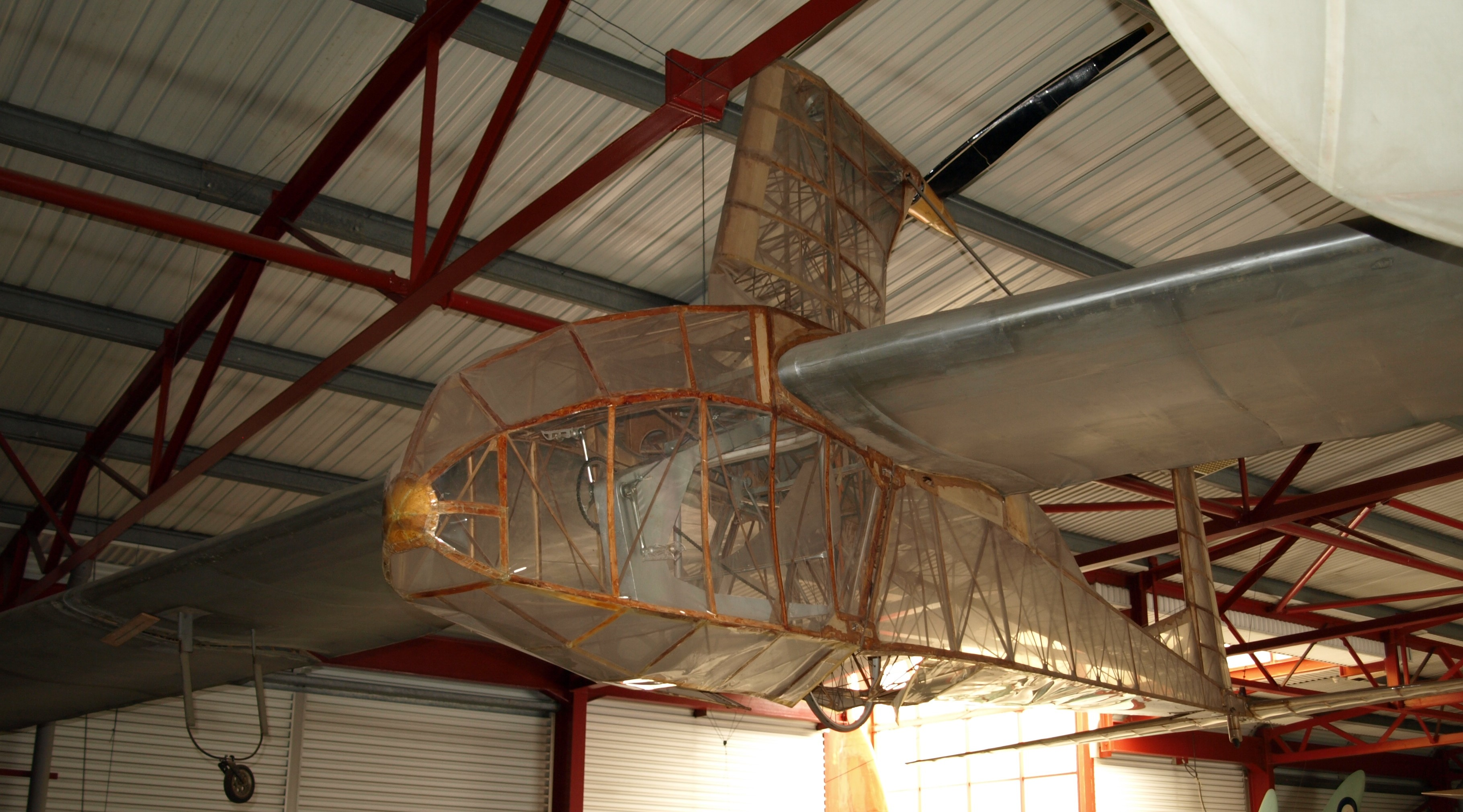
SUMPAC: The first successful human powered aircraft

The first officially authenticated take-off and landing of a human-powered aircraft (one capable of powered take-offs, unlike a glider) was made on 9 November 1961 by Derek Piggott in Southampton University's Man Powered Aircraft (SUMPAC) at Lasham Airfield. The best flight out of 40 attempts was 650 metres (2,100 ft). The SUMPAC was substantially rebuilt by Imperial College with a new transmission system but was damaged beyond repair in November 1965.

The Hatfield Puffin first flew on 16 November 1961, one week after SUMPAC. The Hatfield Man Powered Aircraft Club was formed of employees of de Havilland Aircraft Company and had access to company support. Eventually its best distance was 908 metres (2,980 ft). John Wimpenny said he was very pleased with the performance of the Puffin, which handled beautifully during the flight. His record stood for 10 years.

Puffin 2 was a new fuselage and wing around the transmission recovered from the original Puffin. It flew on 27 August 1965 and made several flights over 800 metres (2,600 ft), including a climb to 5.2 metres (17 ft). After Puffin 2 was damaged, it was handed over to Liverpool University who used it to build the Liverpuffin.

After this date several less successful aircraft flew, until 1972 when the Woodford Essex Aircraft Group's Jupiter, designed and built by Chris Roper, piloted by John Potter flew 1,070 metres (3,510 ft) and 1,239 metres (4,065 ft) in June 1972. Due to Roper's ill health, the project was later continued at RAF Halton – Potter was a serving Royal Air Force (RAF) officer at the time.

=== Royal Aeronautical Society Human Powered Flight Group ===
The Royal Aeronautical Society's "Man Powered Aircraft Group" was formed in 1959 by the members of the Man Powered Group of the College of Aeronautics at Cranfield when they were invited to join the Society (its title was changed from "Man" to "Human" in 1988 because of the many successful flights made by female pilots.). Under the auspices of the Society, that same year, industrialist Henry Kremer offered the first Kremer Prizes of £5,000 for the first human-powered aircraft to fly a figure-of-eight course round two markers half-a-mile apart. It was conditional that the designer, entrant pilot, place of construction and flight must all be British.

=== Kremer Prize successes ===
In 1973, Kremer increased his prize money tenfold to £50,000. At that time, the human-powered aircraft had flown only in straight (or nearly straight) line courses, and no-one had yet even attempted his more challenging figure-eight course, which required a fully controllable aircraft. He also opened the competition to all nationalities; previously it was restricted to British entries only.

On 23 August 1977, the Gossamer Condor 2 flew the first figure-eight, a distance of 2.172 km winning the first Kremer prize. It was built by Dr Paul B. MacCready and piloted by amateur cyclist and hang-glider pilot Bryan Allen. Although slow, cruising at only 18 km/h (11 mph), it achieved that speed with only 260 W (0.35 hp).

The second Kremer prize of £100,000 was won on June 12, 1979, again by Paul MacCready, when Bryan Allen flew MacCready's Gossamer Albatross from England to France: a straight distance of 35.82 km (22.26 mi) in 2 hours, 49 minutes.

=== Kremer speed prize and later flights by MIT team ===
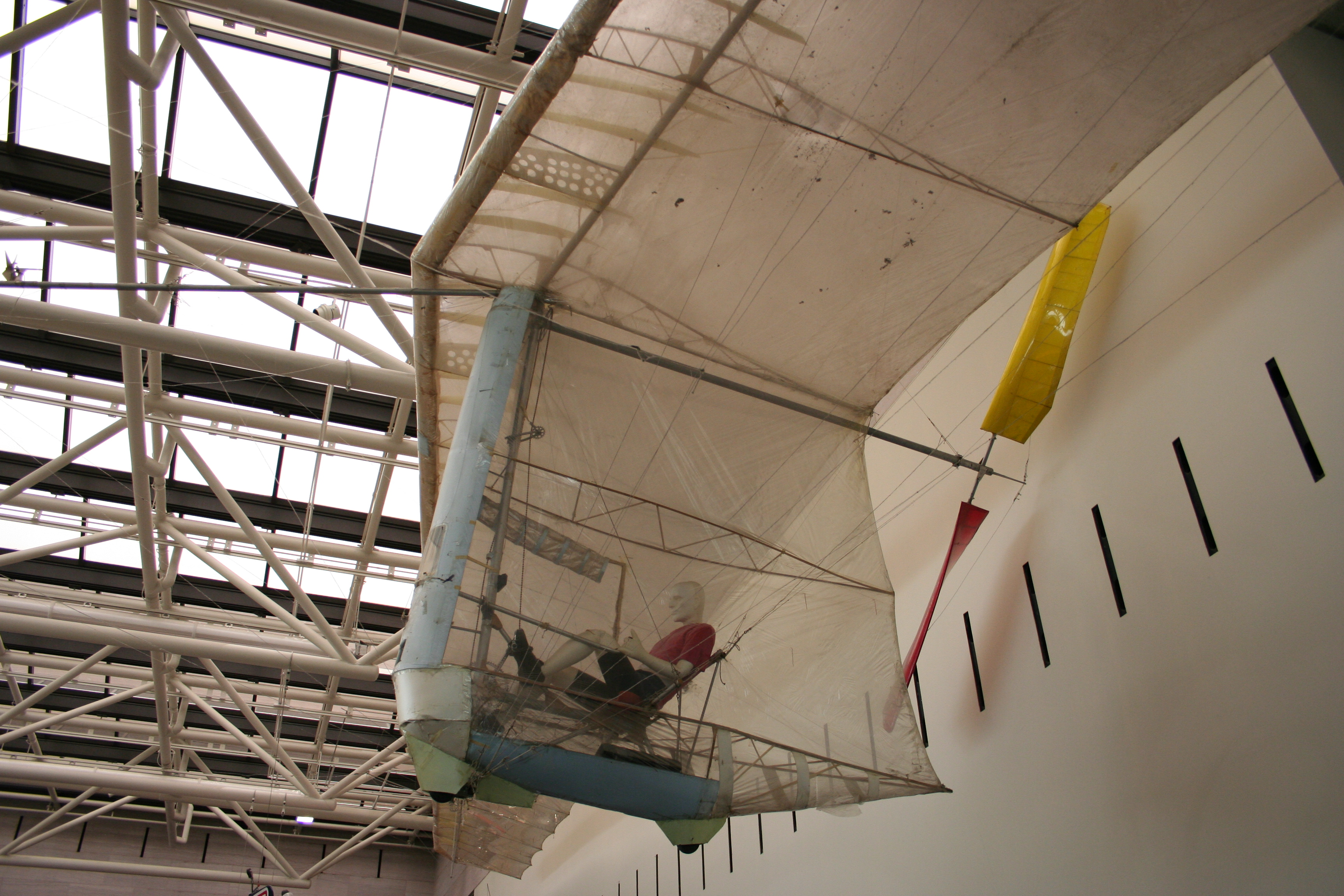
Human-powered aircraft display at the US National Air and Space Museum

A week after the cross-channel flight of Gossamer Albatross, which used a propeller designed by the MIT team, a student-led team at the Massachusetts Institute of Technology achieved first flight on their Chrysalis aircraft, which demonstrated full controllability and was flown by 44 different pilots, including female pilots.

On 11 May 1984, the third Kremer prize of £20,000 for speed went to the MIT design team for flying their Monarch-B craft on a triangular 1.5 km (0.93 mi) course in under three minutes (for an average speed of 32 km/h or 20 mph): pilot Frank Scarabino. Further prizes of £5,000 are awarded to each subsequent entrant improving the speed by at least five percent.

Over the next four years, the MIT group continued to develop their designs, with the Monarch and Monarch-B aircraft succeeded by three follow-on designs, the Light Eagle and two MIT Daedalus aircraft, the Daedalus-87 and Daedalus-88. The current distance record recognised by the FAI was achieved on 23 April 1988 from Iraklion on Crete to Santorini in the MIT Daedalus 88 piloted by Kanellos Kanellopoulos: a straight distance of 115.11 km (71.53 mi).

=== Passenger aircraft ===
The first human-powered passenger flight occurred on 1 October 1984 when Holger Rochelt carried his sister Katrin in Musculair 1.

=== Recent activities ===
Machines have been built and flown in Japan, Germany, Greece, France, Australia, New Zealand, South Africa, Austria, Canada, Singapore, the United States, and the United Kingdom, with their total number approaching a hundred.

With further funds from the late Henry Kremer, the Royal Aeronautical Society announced four new prizes:

- £50,000 for the Kremer International Marathon Competition for a flight round a specified twenty six mile (marathon) distance course, in a time of under one hour;
- £100,000 for the Kremer International Sporting Aircraft Competition for a sporting aeroplane able to operate in normal weather conditions, as encountered in the United Kingdom;
- £1,000 for the Schools Competition;
- £500 for The Robert Graham Competition for students for experimental research or engineering design.

Attempts have been made to claim the £100,000 Kremer Sport prize. Students from Virginia Polytechnic Institute designed an aircraft as part of their AE4065/6 class. A team from the Pennsylvania State University designed the PSU Zephyrus. A team of aerospace engineering students from the University of Southampton designed and constructed the SUHPA.

In 2012, the Royal Aeronautical Society brought into being the Icarus Cup for human powered flying. The first cup was won by Airglow, designed by John and Mark McIntyre. The Icarus Cup is different from the Kremer Prize in that it does not aim to simply break speed and distance records, but make human powered flying into a popular sport. Therefore, the competition includes challenges such as a slalom course, an unaided starting task and a landing accuracy test. The Icarus Cup is held annually at Lasham Airfield, Great Britain, the site of the first human-powered flight.

In 2017, Yuta Watanabe, creator of Birdman House Iga, completed a 40 km (25 mi) round-trip flight. Two years later,he succeeded with a 60 km (37 mi) flight during the Japan International Birdman event above Lake Biwa.

== Types ==
=== Airships ===
Inventors have built human-powered airships, among them the Snoopy in 1979 and the White Dwarf in 1984. By gaining lift through buoyancy instead of air flowing past an airfoil, much less effort is required to power the aircraft.

=== Ornithopters ===
On August 2, 2010, Todd Reichert of the University of Toronto Institute for Aerospace Studies piloted a human-powered ornithopter named Snowbird. The aircraft with 32-metre (105 ft) wingspan and mass of 42 kilograms (93 lb) was constructed from carbon fibre, balsa, and foam. The pilot sat in a small cockpit suspended below the wings and pumped a bar with his feet to operate a system of wires that flapped the wings up and down. Towed by a car until airborne, it then sustained flight for almost 20 seconds. It flew 145 metres (476 ft) with an average speed of 25.6 km/h (15.9 mph). Similar tow-launched flights were made in the past, but improved data collection verified that the ornithopter was capable of self-powered flight once aloft.

== See also ==
- Human-powered transport
- Solar-powered aircraft
- Zero-emissions vehicle
- Human-powered helicopter
- Controllable slope soaring
- Ornithopter
- List of human-powered aircraft

== Bibliography ==
- Cornelisse, Diana G. Splendid Vision, Unswerving Purpose: Developing Air Power for the United States Air Force During the First Century of Powered Flight. Wright-Patterson Air Force Base, Ohio: U.S. Air Force Publications, 2002. ISBN 0-16-067599-5.
- "Man powered flight advances" Flight International, 16 March 1985
- Dr K Sherwin "Man-powered flying as a sport" Flight International, 23 December 1971
- Hirst, Mike. "America's man powered winner" Flight International, 29 October 1977, Vol. 112, No. 3581. pp. 1253–1256.
- Taylor, John W. R. Jane's All The World's Aircraft 1962–63. London: Sampson Low, Marston & Company, Ltd, 1962.
