= MIT Daedalus =

Experimental aircraft

Daedalus
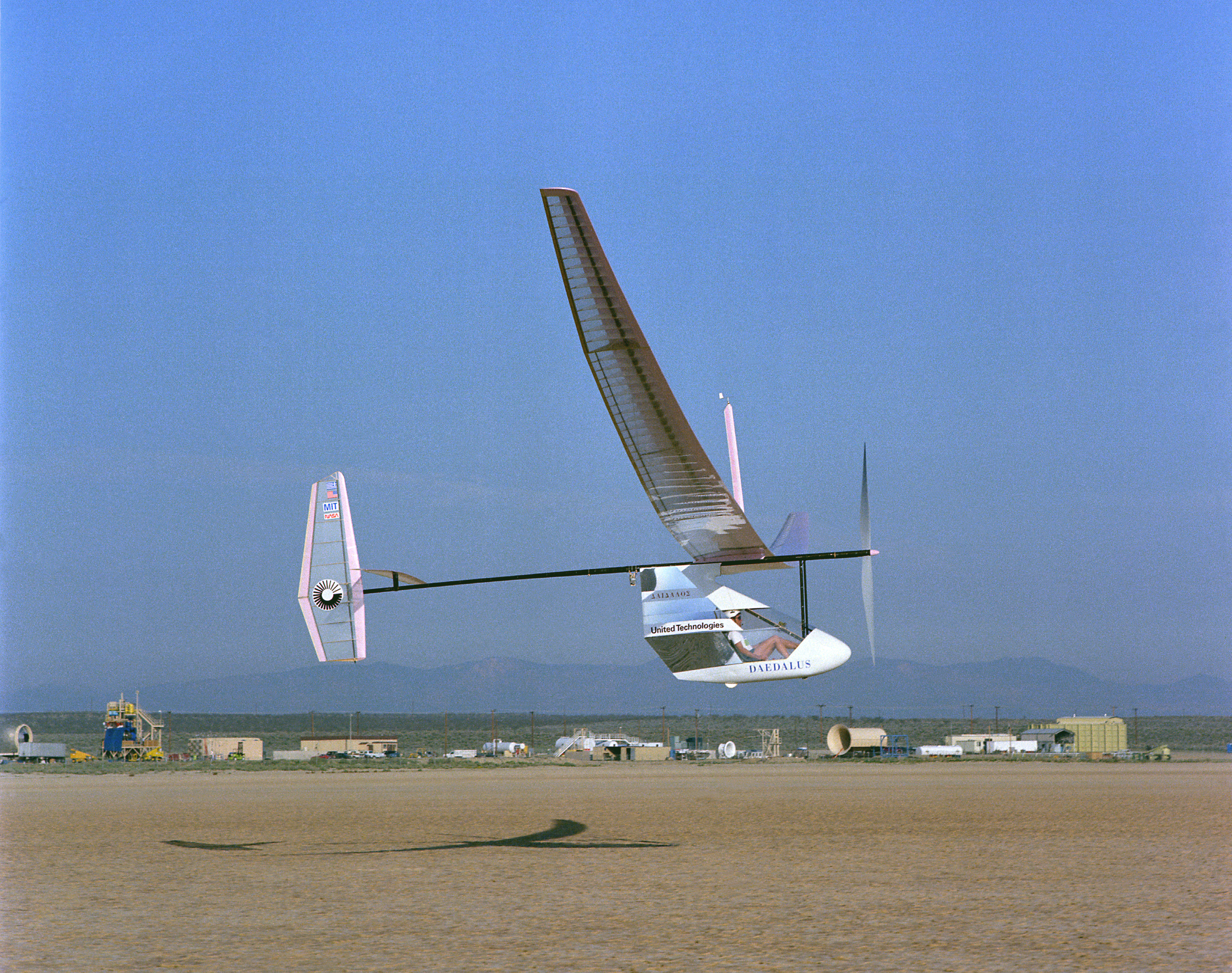
- MIT Daedalus human-powered aircraft in flight during testing at NASA Dryden Flight Research Center

General information
- Type: Human powered aircraft
- National origin: United States
- Manufacturer: MIT - (Massachusetts Institute of Technology)

History
- First flight: 23 April 1988

The MIT Aeronautics and Astronautics Department's Daedalus is a class of three human-powered aircraft that included Daedalus 88, which, on 23 April 1988, flew a distance of 115.11 kilometres (71.53 mi) in 3 hours, 54 minutes, from Heraklion on the island of Crete to the island of Santorini. The flight holds official FAI world records for straight-line distance as well as duration for human-powered fixed-wing aircraft.

The class was named after the mythological inventor of aviation, Daedalus, and was inspired by the Greek myth of Daedalus' escape from Crete using manmade wings.

The three aircraft in the class are:

- Light Eagle (originally Michelob Light Eagle): a 42 kilograms (93 lb) prototype.
- Daedalus 87: Crashed during testing at Rogers Dry Lake (NASA Dryden Flight Research Center) on 17 February 1988, and was rebuilt as a backup.
- Daedalus 88: Flew from Crete to just off the beach on Santorini.

Both Daedalus 87 and Daedalus 88 weighed 31 kilograms (68 lb).

All three aircraft were constructed at the MIT Lincoln Laboratory Flight Facility at Hanscom Field outside Boston, Massachusetts, by a team of undergraduate students, faculty, and recent graduates of MIT.

== History ==
The MIT Daedalus project was the follow-on to several earlier human-powered aircraft flown at MIT, and was designed by veterans of the Chrysalis, Monarch A and Monarch B HPA projects. The team members composing the Daedalus project went on to make notable contributions to experimental aeronautics such as founding the Aurora Flight Sciences company.

== Aircraft ==
=== Light Eagle ===
Light Eagle (known to the flight crew as MLE, or Emily) set a closed-course distance record with Glen Tremml as the pilot, as well as straight-line, closed-course, and duration women's records with Lois McCallin as pilot. These record flights took place at Edwards AFB (NASA Dryden Flight Research Center) in January, 1987.

Light Eagle had been in storage in Manassas, VA, but in 2009 was restored and adapted for use as an unmanned solar-powered aircraft testbed by Aurora Flight Sciences.

=== Daedalus 87 ===
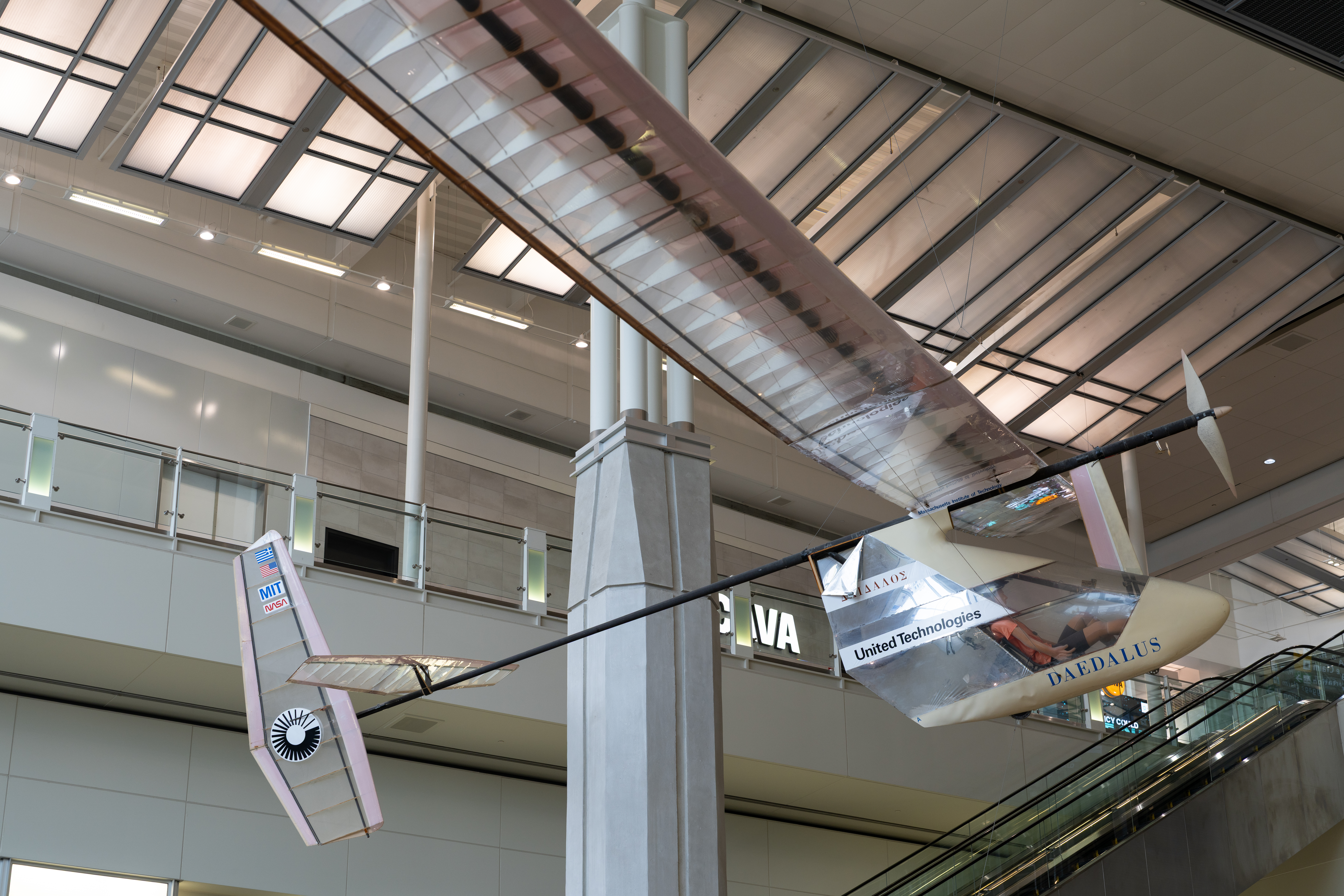
Daedalus 87 aircraft on display in the Dulles International Airport Terminal B transportation concourse

Daedalus 87 was the first of the two Daedalus airplanes constructed, and it was flight tested extensively at NASA Dryden Flight Research Center in California. During flight testing, Daedalus 87 was damaged in a crash caused by spiral divergence, with the rudder not able to supply enough control authority to recover from a disturbance-initiated right turn. The aircraft suffered damage to the right wing, fuselage, and propeller. Daedalus 87 was repaired and returned to service to act as a backup airplane to Daedalus 88.

Daedalus 87 was on display in the lobby at the Museum of Science, Boston, until 2009, and is now on display above the tram stop for Terminal B at Dulles Airport outside Washington, DC.

=== Daedalus 88 ===
The final aircraft in the MIT Daedalus series, Daedalus 88, was used in the flight from Crete. Pieces of Daedalus 88 are now in storage at the Smithsonian's restoration facility.

Both Daedalus aircraft were constructed with a framework of carbon fiber tubes. Airfoil shape for the wing and tail elements was maintained with a thin polystyrene foam leading edge, polystyrene ribs, and a Kevlar trailing edge. Wing skin was Mylar plastic of approximately 0.3 mil (8 μm) thickness. The bottom portion of the fuselage and majority of the pilot seat were made of Kevlar as well. Horizontal and vertical stabilizers were "all-moving" control surfaces.

== Airfoils ==
Mark Drela had recently written the program XFOIL, which enables the design of aerofoils and accurately predicts performance at a wide range of Reynolds numbers. The wing sections never existed on paper, either as lists of numbers or as drawings. The information came out of the design program onto disc, and this guided the cutter. The spar of the MLE (Michelob Light Eagle) was three tubes aligned vertically.

This scheme was abandoned for the final Daedalus design where the more usual single tube was used. Construction of Light Eagle took 15,000 hours work by 18 members of MIT. The airfoils which were used are: DAE11, DAE21, DAE31, and DAE51.

== Record-setting flight ==
The record-setting flight of Daedalus 88 had as pilot Olympic cyclist Kanellos Kanellopoulos of Greece. The flight began at the main airport of Iraklion, on Crete, with a horizontal launch under the pilot's own power, as governed by FAI rules. During the flight, the Daedalus flew primarily between 15 and 30 feet in altitude, and it was accompanied by several escort vessels. The speed of the flight was helped by a tailwind, but this also made a head-on landing approach to the narrow beach hazardous, especially with crowds of spectators on the sand. The pilot maneuvered the aircraft to land more into the wind and parallel with the length of the beach. As the right wing extended over the black sand beach, the heat rising from the beach lifted that wing, turning the aircraft back towards the sea. This effect prevented the pilot from getting the whole aircraft onto the beach.

The flight ended in the water (7 meters from Perissa Beach on Santorini, according to the official record), when increasing gusty winds caused a torsional failure of the tail boom. Lacking control, the airplane then pitched nose-up, and another gust caused a failure of the main wing spar. The pilot swam to shore.

The pilot used a hydration drink during flight.
