= List of human-powered aircraft =

This is a list of human-powered aircraft by date.

| Type | image | Country | Date | Class | Designer / builder | Notes |
|---|---|---|---|---|---|---|
| Abhilasha HPA | | Netherlands | 2009 | | Jesse van Kuijk | |
| AeroVelo Atlas | | Canada | 2013 | Helicopter | Todd Reichert; Cameron Robertson | Winner of Igor I. Sikorsky Human-Powered Helicopter Challenge with 64 s controlled flight, reaching 3.3 m above ground. |
| Airglow HPA | | UK | 1990 | | John and Mark McIntyre | |
| Bauer Bird | | USA | 1973 | Biplane | Ted Bauer | Built by Bauer's eight-grade students at San Gabriel Academy. |
| Betterfly | | UK | 2009 | | David Barford | 950 m max. distance. Capable of 120° turn. Very stable and easy to fly |
| BHI PHANTOM | | Japan | 2021 | | Yuta Watanabe / BIRDMAN HOUSE IGA | Winner of 45th Japan International Birdman Rally (JIBR 2023) HPA division. 69.68242 km round-trip along a 70 km V-shape course (18-17-17-18 km). Piloted by Yuta Watanabe; Flight distance record in JIBR. |
| BHI PHOENIX | | Japan | 2017 | | Yuta Watanabe / BIRDMAN HOUSE IGA | Winner of 40th and 42nd Japan International Birdman Rally (JIBR 2017 and 2019) HPA division. In 2017, 40.000 km completed round-trip flight along a 40 km out-and-return course (20-20 km). In 2019, 60.000 km completed round-trip flight around a 60 km triangle closed circuit course (19-22-19 km). Piloted by Yuta Watanabe; Flight distance record in JIBR in 2017 - 2019 and 2019 - 2023. |
| Bionic Bat | | USA | 1984 | | Paul MacCready Jr. | Two Kremer speed challenges won, doing 1500 m in 163.28 seconds on 18 July 1984 and 143.08 seconds on 2 December 1984. |
| Bird Ornithopter | | UK | | Ornithopter | Bryn Bird | Two prototypes built, but no record of any flights. |
| Bliesner 1 to 3 | | USA | 1978 | | Wayne T. Bliesner | Unsuccessful precursors to Bliesners more successful efforts. No. 3 crashed during towed-flight attempts. |
| Bliesner 4 | | USA | 1979 | | Wayne T. Bliesner | 100 yards. |
| Bliesner 5 | | USA | 1980 | | Wayne T. Bliesner | 1 mile, crashed during testing. |
| Bliesner 6 | | USA | 1980 | | Wayne T. Bliesner | A few hops, crashed during testing. |
| Bliesner 7 | | USA | 1981 | | Wayne T. Bliesner | 300 yards. |
| Boffin-Coffin | | New Zealand | 1988 | | Don Walther | Prone pilot position; tandem wing; pusher propeller. Flight trials, commencing in 1987, were unsuccessful, eventually abandoned after persistent ground-handling damage and a violent gust of wind entering the hangar where the aircraft was stored. |
| Chyeranovskii BICh-18 | | USSR | 1937 | | | Only known to have been launched as a glider with the wing mechanism locked, but flown at least once with the wings operated by the pilot after a launch as a glider. |
| Cochkanoff HPA | | USSR | 1974 | | Orest Cochkanoff | |
| Cook Musfly | | UK | 1977 | | David Cook | Two-place weight-shift tailless HPA. Incomplete |
| Cranfield Vertigo | | UK | 1987 | | Andrew Cranfield | Human-powered helicopter; transmission problems slowed development. |
| CT-2.2 RockHopper2 | | Japan | 2005 | | Yoshiyasu Hirano / Coolthrust | Flew over 18 km at the 29th Japan international Birdman Rally in 2005 piloted by Sosuke Tanaka. |
| Czerwinski HPA | | Canada | 1967 | | Czerwinski | A two-seater with twin propellers built in Ottawa, but no record of any flights. |
| DaSH PA | | USA | 2015 | | Alec Proudfoot | |
| Da Vinci II | | USA | 1988 | Helicopter | California Polytechnic State University | |
| Da Vinci III | | USA | 1989 | Helicopter | California Polytechnic State University | 7 s, height 0.2 m, flight not controlled by pilot. |
| Druiff-Neate Cycloplane | | UK | 1909 | | built by Messrs. C. G. Spencer & Co. | |
| Dumbo-Mercury | | UK | 1971 | | P. K. Green, W. F. Ball and M. J. Rudd / Weybridge MPAG | Originally nickname "Dumbo" at Weybridge. When taken over by John Potter at RAF Cranwell, it was renamed Mercury. |
| Dumoulin tracteur pour la navigation aérienne | | France | 1904 | Biplane | Dumoulin | A human-powered circular-winged biplane with Archimedean screw propellers turned by hand. |
| DUT Icarus 001 | | Netherlands | | | Delft University of Technology | With the Movement Science Faculty of the University of Maastricht. |
| Egret I | | Japan | 1973 | | Kimura / Nihon University | 37 yards. |
| Egret 2 | | Japan | 1974 | | Kimura / Nihon University | 222 yards. |
| Egret 3 | | Japan | 1974 | | Kimura / Nihon University | |
| Farman Aviette HPA | | France | 1912 | | | |
| Flycycle | | | 1974 | | | |
| Fokker I | | Netherlands | 1931 | | Built by brothers Jan and Cor Fokker | Made two towed flights |
| Frost Emmett HPA | | New Zealand | 1970s | | John Frost / University of Auckland | Revisited 1984 |
| Gamera HPH | | USA | 1972 | Helicopter | University of Maryland | |
| Gamera II HPH | | USA | 2012 | Helicopter | University of Maryland | Duration 65 s, height < 1 ft |
| Gerhardt Cycleplane | | USA | 1923 | Multiplane | Flight Test Section at McCook Field | 20-foot (6.1 m) hop. |
| Gokuraku Tombo | | Japan | 1986 | | Team Aeroscepsy | Several HPAs built by the team are called the same. Two Japanese records set under the FAI rules: 4.437 km (May 1992) and 10.881 km (Aug. 2003). The 22nd Japan International Birdman Rally (JIBR) HPA section won, 23.688 km. The first HPA reached the opposite shore (northwest shore) of Lake Biwa from start point at east shore. The 30th JIBR HPA won time-trial section. Piloted by Hironori Nakayama. |
| Goodhart Newbury Manflier | | UK | 1979 | | Nicholas Goodhart | Two-seater with separate pods; pilot control tasks shared. |
| Gossamer Albatross | | USA | 1978 | | Paul MacCready Jr. & Peter Lissaman | Kremer Prize for first cross-channel flight, 12 June 1979. Two records set, both superseded: 35.82 km straight distance and 2h 49 min Duration. |
| Gossamer Condor (Pasadena version) | | USA | 1976 | | Paul MacCready Jr. & Peter Lissaman | One short hop only, in the car park of the Pasadena Rose Bowl. |
| Gossamer Condor (Mojave version) | | USA | 1976 | | Paul MacCready Jr. & Peter Lissaman | (Mojave version) |
| Gossamer Condor (Shafter airport version) | | USA | 1977 | | Paul MacCready Jr. & Peter Lissaman | Kremer prize for figure-eight course, 1.15 miles (1850 m), 7 min 25 s flight, 23 August 1977. |
| Halton Jupiter | | UK | 1972 | | Christopher Roper /John Potter | 1171 m, 1 min 47 s flight |
| Hardy HPA | | | | | Roger Hardy | |
| Hartman Ikarus | | UK | 1959 | | Emiel Hartman | |
| Hill Flying Wing | | | | | Hill | |
| HMPAC Puffin 1 | | UK | 1961 | | Wimpenny, Vann & Hatfield Man Powered Aircraft Club | 993 yards. |
| HMPAC Puffin 2 | | UK | 1965 | | Wimpenny, Vann & Hatfield Man Powered Aircraft Club | 875 yards, height 17 feet, turns. |
| Aviette Hurel | | France | 1974 | | Maurice Hurel | Flight trials in June 1974 |
| HV-1 Mufli | | Germany | 1935 | | Helmut Haessler & F. Villinger | MUSKELFLUG INSTITUT (Institute of Muscle-Powered-Flight) At the Gesellschaft Polytechnic, Frankfurt, director – Oskar Ursinus – 779 yards from bungee launch. Flugzeug-Typenbuch. Handbuch der deutschen Luftfahrt- und Zubehör-Industrie 1944 |
| HVS | | Germany | 1982 | | Hütter/Villinger/Schüle | Operated in 20 mph winds. |
| HYPER-CHick "KoToNo Limited" | | Japan | 1992 | | Toshiaki Yoshikawa / Team Active Gals | First female flight in Japan on 5 July 1992, with Kotono Hori as pilot. 119.45 m (130.19 yards) / 22.98 seconds |
| Ibis HPA | | Japan | 1978 | | Nihon University | Further development of the Jupiter – Stork line. |
| Icarus HPA-1 | | USA | 1977 | | Taras Kiceniuk Jr. | Longest flight of 30 seconds at Shafter Airport. |
| Kiceniuk Icarus | | | 1975 | | Taras Kiceniuk Jr. | WIGE HPAC project |
| Kohm Lady Godiva | | USA | 1982 | | Thomas Kohm et al. | Replica of the MacCready Gossamer Albatross. First "girl-powered" HPA |
| Linnet I | | Japan | 1966 | | Prof. Kimura / Research Institute of Science and Technology, Nihon University | 47 yards, height 9 feet. |
| Linnet II | | Japan | 1967 | | Prof. Kimura / Research Institute of Science and Technology, Nihon University | 100 yards, height 5 feet. |
| Linnet III | | Japan | 1970 | | Prof. Kimura / Research Institute of Science and Technology, Nihon University | 34 yards. |
| Linnet IV | | Japan | 1971 | | Prof. Kimura / Research Institute of Science and Technology, Nihon University | 66 yards. |
| Lippisch 1929 Man-Powered Ornithopter | | Germany | 1929 | Ornithopter | Alexander Lippisch | Flown by Hans Werner Krause. |
| Liverpuffin | | UK | 1972 | | Keith Sherwin | Built from the remains of the Puffin II by students from Liverpool University led by Sherwin. |
| Malliga 1 HPA | | Austria | 1967 | | Josef Malliga | |
| Malliga 2 HPA | | Austria | 1972 | | Josef Malliga | |
| Maniatis MPA | | USA | 1979 | | Michael Maniatis | Tested at Mitchel Field, NY. Did not fly. |
| Man-Eagle 1 | | USA | 1982 | | Wayne T. Bliesner | Short flights a.k.a. "Bliesner 8". |
| Man-Eagle 3 | | USA | 1983 | | Wayne T. Bliesner | Kremer Speed Course. |
| Man-Eagle 4 | | USA | 1985 | | Wayne T. Bliesner | |
| Maruoka Man-Powered Screw-Wing Machine | | Japan | 1902 | | Katsura Maruoka | |
| Southend MPG Mayfly | | UK | 1965 | | Brian Kerry | |
| McAvoy MPA-1 | | USA | 1962 | | James M. McAvoy | Georgia Tech. |
| Michelob Light Eagle | | USA | 1986 | | Mark Drela / Massachusetts Institute of Technology | 37 miles. Onboard test equipment. |
| MiLan'81 | | Japan | 1981 | | Naito / Nihon University | 645 yards. |
| MiLan'82 | | Japan | 1982 | | Naito / Nihon University | 1800 yards. |
| MIT BURD | | USA | 1973 | Biplane | Massachusetts Institute of Technology | First of several HPAs built by MIT students. Did not fly. |
| MIT BURD II | | USA | 1976 | Biplane | Massachusetts Institute of Technology | Copy of the original BURD. Did not fly. |
| MIT Chrysalis | | USA | 1979 | Biplane | Parks & Youngren / Massachusetts Institute of Technology | Over a four-month period, made 345 flights with 44 different pilots. |
| MIT Daedalus 87 | | USA | 1987 | | Drela / Massachusetts Institute of Technology | MIT Daedalus Project. |
| MIT Daedalus 88 | | USA | 1988 | | Drela / Massachusetts Institute of Technology | MIT Daedalus Project. 1988 Crete to Santorini flight, official FAI world records for total distance (119 km), straight-line distance, and duration (3 h 55 min) for human-powered aircraft. |
| MIT Monarch A | | USA | 1983 | | Mark Drela / Massachusetts Institute of Technology | 29 flights. |
| MIT Monarch B | | USA | 1984 | | Drela / Massachusetts Institute of Technology | Won the £20,000 first prize for the Kremer World Speed Competition. |
| Möwe6-B | | Japan | 1990 | | Nihon University Aero Student Group (NASG) | First Japanese record set under the FAI rules. Distance: 3.708 km (Mar. 1990) |
| Möwe20 | | Japan | 2002 | | Nihon University Aero Student Group (NASG) | The 27th Japan International Birdman Rally (JIBR) HPA section won, 34.654 km. Pilot was not exhausted but took water by organizer direction because the HPA reached end of flyable area (southwest side of Lake Biwa) (Jul. 2003) – straight-distance record in JIBR. Japanese record set under the FAI rules. 11.874 km / 46 min 40 s (Aug. 2004). Piloted by Kai Hirawata. |
| Möwe21 | | Japan | 2003 | | Nihon University Aero Student Group (NASG) | Japanese records set under the FAI rules. 49.172 km, 1 h 48 min 12 s (6 Aug. 2005). Current Japanese records. Piloted by Nariyuki Masuda. |
| Mozi HPA | | China | 2009 | | OXAI Aircraft Company / Mao Yiqing | |
| Musculair I | | Germany | 1984 | | Günther Rochelt & Schoberl | Two different prizes; first passenger. |
| Musculair II | | Germany | 1985 | | Günther Rochelt & Schoberl | Kremer Speed Prize. |
| Nakamura MP-X-6 | | Japan | 1969 | | Eiji Nakamura | |
| Nextz | | Japan | 2009 | | Team 'F' | Winner of 33rd Japan International Birdman Rally HPA time-trial section. First Japanese record of speed under the FAI rules: 1500 m in 3 min 15 s = 27.69 km/h (22 Oct. 2012). As of 2012 current Japanese record. |
| Nieuport Aviette 1921 | | France | 1921 | | | |
| Northrop Institute of Technology HPA | | USA | 1972 | | Malcolm Smith / NIT | Two-seater; not completed. |
| Onigkeit 1938 | | Germany | 1938 | | Otto Onigkeit | Flugzeug-Typenbuch. Handbuch der deutschen Luftfahrt- und Zubehör-Industrie 1944 |
| Pedaliante | | Italy | 1936 | | Enea Bossi & Vittorio Bonomi | 40 unaided flights? |
| Pelargos 2 | | Switzerland | 1983 | | Horlacher/Mohlin/Dubs | 1100 yards. |
| Pelargos 3 | | Switzerland | 1985 | | Horlacher/Mohlin/Frank | 875 yards. |
| Perkins Inflatable HPA | | USA | 1959 | Inflatable | Daniel Perkins | Precursor to the Reluctant Phoenix. |
| Perkins Reluctant Phoenix | | UK | 1966 | Inflatable | Daniel Perkins | The culmination of Daniel Perkins' attempts to build a viable inflatable human-powered aircraft; flown inside the R100 airship hangars. |
| Phillips Mk.1 HPA | | UK | 1976 ? | | Ron Phillips | First female pilot. |
| Phillips Mk.2 HPA | | UK | 1976 ? | | Ron Phillips | Two-seater. |
| Polniak LP Dedal | | Poland | 1972 | | Leon Polniak | |
| Polniak LP Dedal-2 | | Poland | 1975 | | Leon Polniak | |
| Posniak HPA | | Netherlands | 1936 | | B. Posniak | |
| Poulain/Farman Aviette | | France | 1921 | | Gabriel Poulain / Farman | |
| Prestwick Dragonfly MPA Mk 1 | | Scotland | 1975 | | Roger Hardy | |
| Privett HPA | | USA | | | Doug Privett | Cannot take off without a ground-crew assist |
| PSU Zephyrus | | USA | 2011 | | Pennsylvania State University | |
| Raven Project | | USA | 2001 | | Paul Illian | |
| Ray | | Japan | 2008 | | Tohoku University Windnauts (HPA club at Tohoku University) | Winner of 32nd Japan International Birdman Rally (JIBR) HPA – distance section. 36 km round-trip; completed out-and-return course of 18 km one-way (longest distance under the rules at the time). Piloted by Wataru Nishiwaki; round-trip distance record in JIBR until 2017. |
| Rickman umbrella wing | | UK | 1909 | | Rickman | |
| Royal Spoonbill | | UK | 1983 | | Robert Le Johnno-Johnson / NZHPFG | Never completed due to a redesign after being vandalised. |
| Seehase MD-2 | | Germany | 1937 | | Hans Seehase | |
| Skycycle | | Australia | 1991 | | TAFE Tasmania | |
| Singapore University Man powered Aircraft 1 Singapore University Man powered Aircraft 2 | | Singapore | | | Singapore University students / Keith Sherwin | Of the two projects, only one flew. |
| Smolkowski-Laviolette biplane | | Canada | 1964 | | Alvin Smolkowski and Maurice Laviolette | Towed flights |
| Sato Maeda SM-OX | | Japan | 1969 | | Hiroshi Sato, Kenichi Maeda / Fukuoka Daiichi Highschool Department of Aeroengine | 31 yards, height 6 feet. |
| Snowbird HPO | | Canada | 2010 | | University of Toronto | |
| Stewart HPOs | | UK | 1959 | Ornithopter | Alan Stewart | Several unsuccessful human-powered ornithopters built between 1959 and 1979. |
| Stork A | | Japan | 1976 | | Junji Ishii / Nihon University | 651 yards. Re-designed (smaller) from the UK Jupiter. |
| Stork B | | Japan | 1977 | | Junji Ishii / Nihon University | 2094 m, 4 min 28 s flight. |
| SUMPAC | | UK | 1961 | | Ann Marsden, Alan Lassiere & David Williams / Southampton University Man-powered Aircraft Committee | First independently observed unaided flight. Flown by Derek Piggott. |
| Swift A | | Japan | | | Naito / Nihon University | |
| Swift B | | Japan | | | Naito / Nihon University | |
| To Phoenix | | UK | 1981 | Inflatable | Frederick E. To / Air-Plane Co. Ltd. | |
| Toucan 1 | | UK | 1972 | | Pressnell / Hertfordshire Pedal Aeronauts | 700 yards. Two-seater, span 123 ft. Bryan Bowen & Derek May |
| Toucan II | | UK | 1974 | | Pressnell / Hertfordshire Pedal Aeronauts | |
| Upturn | | USA | 2012 | Helicopter | NTS Works Upturn | duration 10 s, height 0.60 m |
| Upenieks Oscillocopter | | Australia | 1970s | Ornithopter | Harijs Upenieks | Series of 3 aircraft |
| Ursinus 1925 HPA | | Germany | 1925 | | Oskar Ursinus | |
| Vélair 89 | | Germany | 1989 | | Peer Frank | 3390 yards |
| Vine HPA | | South Africa | 1962 | | S. W. Vine | 200 yards. One flight only at Krugersdorp, Transvaal, South Africa. |
| VMM HPA | | Belgium | 1974 | | Verstralte/Masschelin/Masschelin | Heights of 15 ft at Calais-Marck airport due to Belgian authorities refusing permission to fly. |
| White Dwarf (dirigible) | | USA | 1984 | Airship | Bill Watson | Built for the comedian Gallagher and seen in Showtime special Over Your Head. Set records in airship categories BA-1 through BA-10 for distance (93.36 km) and duration (8 h 50 min 12 s). |
| Wright Micron | | UK | 1976 | | Peter Wright | |
| Wright MPA Mk 1 | | UK | 1972 | | Peter Wright | 300 yards at 4 feet. Elevator not used. |
| Yuri I HPH | | Japan | 1994 | Helicopter | Akira Naito, Nihon Aero Student Group (NASG) | Duration 19.5 s, height 0.2 m |
| Zaschka Human-Power Aircraft | | Germany | 1934 | | Engelbert Zaschka | |
| Zephyrus β | | Japan | 1997 | | Ochanomizu Human-powered aircraft study group | Japanese female record set under the FAI rules, 1.004 km in 3 min 3 s. (16 Nov. 1997). Piloted by Chihiro Muraoka – current Japanese female records. |
| Zinno Olympian ZB-1 | | USA | 1976 | | Lt.Col. Joe Zinno, USAF (Ret.) | First successful American HPA. |

== See also ==
- History of human-powered aircraft
