= Smolkowski-Laviolette biplane =

1960s Canadian human-powered aircraft

General information
- Type: Human-powered aircraft
- National origin: Canada
- Manufacturer: Alvin Smolkowski and Maurice Laviolette
- Number built: 1

History
- First flight: 1964

The Smolkowski-Laviolette biplane was a Canadian human-powered biplane designed and built by two Calgary aeronautical engineers, Alvin Smolkowski and Maurice Laviolette, in the 1960s.

Smolkowski and Laviolette were based at the Southern Alberta Institute of Technology at Calgary, and they commenced design of the biplane in December 1960, with a view towards winning the Kremer prize then on offer.

The aircraft had a primary structure made of aluminum alloy, and a secondary structure made of metal tubing, polystyrene, and foam sheets. It was a single-bay biplane, spanning 30 ft (9.1 m), with struts of metal tubing, and rigged with lift and drag wires. The airfoil section incorporated a deflected trailing edge. Unlike contemporary HPAs, the craft was covered with doped fabric, which incurred a weight penalty. The fuselage was of the pod-and-boom type. The pilot sat in a recumbent position, in a semi-enclosed cockpit, and powered the tractor propeller, positioned at the end of a boom, via a set of bicycle pedals powering a chain drive. Both biplane wings and the propeller were fitted with end-plates, in order to mitigate issues with induced drag. The control system incorporated a T-bar column suspended from the upper-wing, operating the elevator and rudder. There did not appear to be any form of lateral control, however the biplane wings were set at a slight dihedral.

Laviolette departed the project before completion, with Smolkowski continuing alone. The biplane was completed in 1964, and it was reported that even with the support of a grant from a Canadian Aeronautics and Space Institute committee, and material supplied by Alberta aviation clubs, Smolkowski had to work overtime in order to finance the completion of the craft.

When tested, the biplane proved unable to make un-assisted flights, however it did make a number of short flights towed behind an automobile.

== Specifications ==
Data from Western Wings

General characteristics

- Crew: 1
- Wingspan: 30 ft (9.1 m)
- Wing area: 300 sq ft (28 m^{2})
- Empty weight: 90 lb (41 kg)
- Propellers: 3-bladed, 6 ft (1.8 m) diameter

Performance

== See also ==
Aircraft of comparable role, configuration, and era

- Cook Musfly
- Goodhart Newbury Manflier
- HMPAC Puffin
- HPA Toucan
- Malliga 1
- MacCready Gossamer Albatross
- MacCready Gossamer Condor

Related lists

- List of Human-powered aircraft
