= Prestwick Dragonfly MPA Mk 1 =

1970s United Kingdom human-powered aircraft

Prestwick Dragonfly

General information
- Type: Human-powered aircraft
- National origin: United Kingdom
- Manufacturer: Prestwick Man Powered Aircraft Group
- Number built: 1

The Dragonfly was a human-powered aircraft, designed and built by the Prestwick Man Powered Aircraft Group, based at the Prestwick International Airport in South Ayrshire, Scotland.

== Design and development ==
The aircraft was developed with the specific goal of winning the £50,000 Kremer prize then on offer. Its designer, Roger Hardy, previously had experience with three other HPAs; the SUMPAC, Jupiter, and the Mercury.

An emphasis was placed on it being a practical, easily-built, machine, with the construction requiring a comparatively low amount of work hours. It was intended to fly outside of ground effect, reaching an altitude of 60 ft (18 m) in 5 minutes, at what was described as "a small but realistic rate of climb." If attempting the Kremer course, such altitude would permit greater room for manoeuvres without suffering from wing tip stalls.

The Dragonfly was a wire-braced high-wing monoplane, with a pylon-mounted propeller, and had no unconventional features. The wing had an aspect ratio of 30, and a relatively high wing-loading. The wing could increase its dihedral under flight load, changing from 6° when static, to 10° in flight. Lateral control was achieved by differential ailerons. The wing had a single wooden box-spar, with a secondary structure made from spruce, balsa and polystyrene. The fuselage was of the pod and boom type, a primary structure made using aluminium alloy, and a secondary structure of balsa. The empennage featured a small all-flying tailplane, or stabilator, and a large fin, half of was the rudder. The entire aircraft was covered in Melinex. The pilot was in a recumbent cycling position, and powered the plyon-mounted propeller.

Construction began in February 1975, and was completed by July. Taxying trials took place in August 1975, however they revealed issues with the craft. It failed to achieve take-off due to the high thrust-line of the propeller and the small moment of the tail-plane. During the following two months, changes made to the aircraft included the strengthening of the rear fuselage, increasing the moment arm of the tail-plane, and changing the pylon-mounted propeller from a pusher to a tractor configuration.

Jane's all the world's aircraft 1976-77 wrote that further flight tests may take place from the Spring of 1977 onward. An article in the February 1977 issue AeroModeller stated that Ron Frost had taken over development of the aircraft.

== Specifications ==
Data from Jane's all the world's aircraft 1976-77

General characteristics

- Crew: 1
- Length: 24 ft 1.50 in (7.3533 m)
- Wingspan: 80 ft (24 m)
- Height: 9 ft 7 in (2.92 m) with propeller horiztonal
- Wing area: 213.50 sq ft (19.835 m^{2})
- Aspect ratio: 30
- Airfoil: Wortmann FX63-137
- Empty weight: 95 lb (43 kg)
- Gross weight: 232 lb (105 kg)
- Max takeoff weight: 252 lb (114 kg)
- Propellers: 2-bladed fixed pitch, 9 ft (2.7 m) diameter

Performance

- Maximum speed: 23 mph (37 km/h, 20 kn)
- Cruise speed: 19 mph (31 km/h, 17 kn)
- Stall speed: 16 mph (26 km/h, 14 kn)
- Never exceed speed: 31 mph (50 km/h, 27 kn)
- Wing loading: 1.18 lb/sq ft (5.8 kg/m^{2}) at maximum take-off weight

== See also ==
Aircraft of comparable role, configuration, and era

- Kohm Lady Godiva
- MacCready Gossamer Albatross
- MacCready Gossamer Condor
- MIT BURD II
- MIT Chrysalis
- MIT Daedalus

Related lists

- List of human-powered aircraft
