= Hartman Ikarus =

1950s British human-powered ornithopter

Ikarus

General information
- Type: Human-powered aircraft
- National origin: United Kingdom
- Designer: Emiel Hartman
- Built by: Don Campbell
- Number built: 1

History
- First flight: 1959

The Ikarus was a human-powered ornithopter, designed by the sculptor and designer Emiel Hartman in the late 1950s.

== Development ==
The ornithopter was a high-wing monoplane, with the pilot seated in a recumbent position. Its construction followed conventional glider practice of the time. The fuselage had a bulkhead construction, covered in thin plywood. The wings featured a torsion-box spar and leading edge arrangement, and were also made from thin plywood. A series of 30 'feathers', covered in madapollam cotton were attached aft of the spar, and were able to individually bend and twist as the wings were flapped. The wings could be flapped through an arc of 30° dihedral to 10° anhedral, via a parallelogram structure which the pilot could operate using leg and arm power, with a rowing-like action. Bungee cords were integrated into the drive mechanism, to absorb and release energy as needed. It was expected that the wings would flap at 30 beats per minute. The craft featured a conventional empennage, with the pilot being able to control the elevator and rudder. There was no provision for lateral control. There was a tricycle undercarriage, with a steerable nosewheel.

Design of the ornithopter began in February 1958, with Hartman seeking advice from a number of aviation organisations and consultants. Construction commenced in August, with the work being undertaken by the glider constructor Don Campbell of Hungerford, Berkshire. The craft was completed by August 1959, with initial taxi trials being undertaken in September. In mid-October, the Ikarus was delivered to Cranfield Airport for further tests.

== Testing ==
Flight testing commenced on Sunday, 1 November 1959, with Hartman acting as pilot. Non-flapping flights were made, towed behind an automobile. During a subsequent towed flight, conducted on Wednesday, 4 November, at an altitude of 30 ft (9.1 m), Hartman experienced control difficulties due to a 7 mph (11 km/h) crosswind, landed heavily and incurred a ground loop, which damaged the port wing.

In 1964, it was reported that the Ikarus was still in storage at the College of Aeronautics, at Cranfield, with no further flight attempts having been made. The project (including design, drawing, and construction) was said to have involved 4,624 hours worth of work, and to have cost £2,450.

== Patents ==
- GB patent 885273, Emile Hartman, "Improvements relating to ornithopters", issued 20 December 1961
- GB patent 851352, Emile Hartman, "Improvements relating to ornithopters", issued 12 October 1960

== Specifications ==
Data from Sailplane and Gliding

General characteristics

- Crew: 1
- Wingspan: 36 ft (11 m)
- Wing area: 144 sq ft (13.4 m^{2})
- Aspect ratio: 9
- Airfoil: Göttingen 535
- Empty weight: 282 lb (128 kg)
- Powerplant: 1 × Pilot leg and arm power

Performance

- Cruise speed: 25 mph (40 km/h, 22 kn)

== See also ==
Aircraft of comparable role, configuration, and era

- Cook Musfly
- Goodhart Newbury Manflier
- HMPAC Puffin
- HPA Toucan
- Malliga 1
- MacCready Gossamer Albatross
- MacCready Gossamer Condor

Related lists

- List of human-powered aircraft
