= Gerhardt Cycleplane =

Cycleplane

General information
- Type: Human-powered aircraft
- National origin: United States
- Designer: William Frederick Gerhardt
- Number built: 1

History
- First flight: 1923

The Gerhardt Cycleplane has been called the world's first successful human-powered aircraft. It was designed by Dr. William Frederick Gerhardt (January 31, 1896 – March 15, 1984), and assembled by the staff of the Flight Test Section at McCook Field in Dayton, Ohio. It was flown in 1923.

Its only successful human-powered takeoff went 6 metres (20 ft) with the craft rising 60 centimetres (2 ft) above the ground.

== See also ==
- SUMPAC
- Gossamer Albatross
- Gossamer Condor
- Pitts Sky Car

Related lists

- List of Human-powered aircraft
