= Nicholas Goodhart =

British aviator (1919–2011)

Rear-Admiral Nicholas Goodhart CB FRAeS
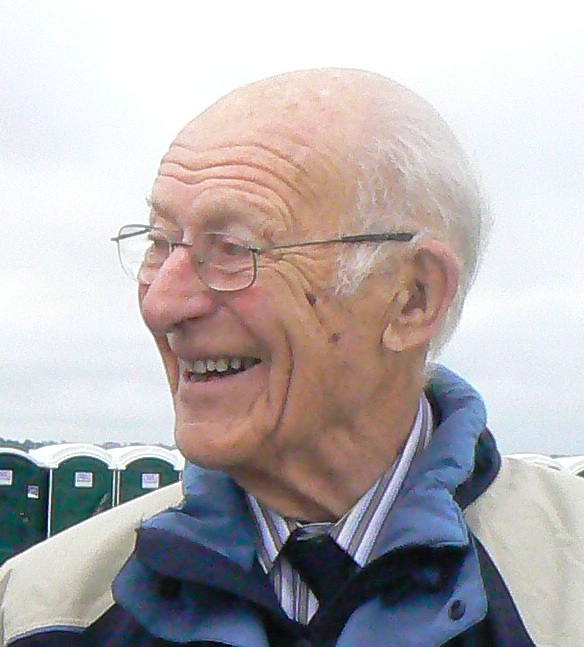
- Nicholas Goodhart, taken 7 September 2008, at Lasham Airfield
- Born: 28 September 1919; Inkpen, Berkshire
- Died: 9 April 2011 (age 91)
- Military career
- Branch: Fleet Air Arm (FAA)
- Service years: 1933-1973
- Rank: Rear-Admiral
- Nickname: Nick
- Awards: Companion in The Most Honourable Order of the Bath; FRAeS Silver Medal by the Royal Aero Club in 1956.; awarded Paul Tissandier Diploma by the FAI, 1956
- Other work: Operation Sigma; Newbury Manflier

Rear-Admiral Hilary Charles Nicholas Goodhart CB FRAeS (28 September 1919 – 9 April 2011) was an engineer and aviator who invented the mirror-sight deck landing system for aircraft carriers. He was also a world champion and record breaker in gliding.

== Early life ==
Goodhart was born at Inkpen, Berkshire, the son of a patent engineer. He was educated at Miss White's Kintbury, and Connaught House Weymouth.

== Early career ==
Goodhart entered the Royal Naval College at Dartmouth in the Hawke Term in 1933. He then attended the Royal Naval Engineering College at Keyham, Devonport. He served as an engineering lieutenant, and saw action in the evacuation of Crete in 1941 on HMS Formidable which was hit by two 1,000 lb (450 kg) bombs. He then served on HMS Dido and saw more action escorting convoys to Malta and the assaults on Italy over the next two years.

He undertook pilot training in Canada in 1944 and joined the Fleet Air Arm. While flying in a Grumman Hellcat with 896 Naval Air Squadron from the carrier HMS Ameer off the coast of the Nicobar Islands, he ditched because of engine failure on 11 July 1945 and was picked up by the destroyer, HMS Vigilant.

Goodhart graduated from the Empire Test Pilots' School at Cranfield in 1946,

With this qualification he tested the turboprop Westland Wyvern fighter for acceptance by the Royal Navy for use on aircraft carriers. He survived five serious incidents including damage to the aircraft's canopy during a high-speed test flight.

He then became senior pilot of 700 Squadron at RNAS Yeovilton

He then returned to test pilot duties at the Naval Air Station (NAS) Donibristle, Scotland; the Aircraft and Armament Experimental Establishment (A&AEE) at Boscombe Down, Wiltshire; and the US Naval Air Test Center, Maryland, USA.

During his military career he flew over 50 types of aircraft.

After a period as technical secretary at the Ministry of Supply he was promoted to commander in 1953.

== Carrier developments ==
Trials after 1945 by the Royal Navy revealed that the slow throttle response of jet aircraft meant they could not safely use the standard deck landing technique then in use by propeller-driven aircraft. Even in peacetime, carrier operations killed 20% of the aircrew. Goodhart therefore invented the mirror-sight deck landing system in 1951. The device was first introduced in the Royal Navy in 1954 and by the US Navy in 1955. Shortly before Dennis Cambell, with Lewis Boddington, invented the angled flight deck. The invention of the mirror system and the angled flight deck greatly increased the safety for jet aircraft when landing on an aircraft carrier. There was also a saving in arrester gear units and barriers – Ark Royal needed only four wires and one (emergency only) barrier. The reduction in weight and the extra space that this conferred enabled more mess-decks to be fitted in, thus reducing congestion in living spaces. It was recorded that for US carriers, the landing accident rate fell by 80% from 35 per 10,000 landings in 1954 to 7 per 10,000 landings in 1957. The US Navy awarded Goodhart the Legion of Merit for his invention and he received an undisclosed sum from the Admiralty.

== Later naval career ==
After a further spell at Yeovilton, Goodhart was posted to the air warfare department at the Admiralty and then at sea as the staff aviation officer to the flag officer aircraft carriers. He was promoted to Captain in 1962 and made project manager of the Sea Dart anti-aircraft missile programme. After a course at the Imperial Defence College in 1965, he became director of aircraft maintenance and repair in the Admiralty until 1968. He was then promoted to commodore and then rear-admiral and became director of defence operational requirements and finally military deputy to the head of defence sales. He was appointed Companion in The Most Honourable Order of the Bath in 1972 and he retired from the Royal Navy in 1973.

== Gliding ==
Goodhart joined Yorkshire Gliding Club at Sutton Bank in 1938, going solo within a week. He was also at various times a member of Cambridge University Gliding Club and Lasham Gliding Society in Hampshire.

He began gliding competitively, first sharing a glider with his brother, Tony, winning the British Team Championship in 1950, in which a glider was flown on alternate days by different people (a so-called "team").

In 1955 he climbed to 9,300 m (30,500 ft) in the USA and became the first British glider pilot to gain a complete Diamond Badge with all three "diamonds". Later in 1955 he broke the British National Altitude Record in a Schweizer SGS 1-23 in California climbing to 11,500 m (37,700 ft).

He was a member of the British team at the World Championships from 1956 to 1972. In 1956 at Saint-Yan in France, he and Frank Foster won the World Gliding Two Seater Championship in a Slingsby Eagle two seater. The US Soaring magazine noted that the only single seater to beat them was the winner, Paul MacCready.

He finished in second place in the single seater World Championships in 1958 Leszno, Poland, and fourth in 1960 and 1972. He was British single-seater champion on three occasions (1962, 1967 & 1971), and in second place on four others.

He finished first in the American Championships in 1955, though as foreigner could not be the US Champion and was placed "above first"

At Lasham on 10 May 1959 he declared a goal of Portmoak in Scotland and achieved a record goal flight of 579.36 kilometres (360.00 mi) in a Slingsby Skylark 3 at an average speed of 90.7 km/h (49.0 kn). This is still the UK goal-distance-record for gliders of wingspan not greater than 20 metres; and the speed record for a 500 km (310 mi) goal flight. During his gliding career he held eleven British records.

Goodhart set up the project in 1966 to develop a glider called Sigma to compete in the 1970 World Championship Open class. Sigma flew from Lasham Gliding Centre in 1971, but did not reach its expected performance. This was due to leakage of air around its large "Fowler flaps". Sigma was eventually sold to a syndicate in North America and its desired performance was eventually exceeded by a variety of large-span production gliders from manufacturers in Germany.

He was awarded the Silver Medal by the Royal Aero Club in 1956. In 1972 he was awarded the Paul Tissandier Diploma by the FAI. This award recognizes "those who have served the cause of Aviation in general and Sporting Aviation in particular, by their work, initiative, devotion or in other ways".

== Human-powered flight ==
Goodhart's team put in over 3,000 man-hours of effort developing the two seater Newbury Manflier project in an effort to win the Kremer prize for man-powered flight. The aircraft's two pilots were seventy feet apart, each in their own fuselage. However the team was beaten by Goodhart's old rival Paul MacCready with the Gossamer Condor's flight in 1977 and by the Gossamer Albatross for the first cross-Channel flight in 1979. Goodhart's project was terminated soon after the first flights had been achieved in 1979 because the hangar and runway at Greenham Common were required for the US Air Force.

== Other activities ==
Goodhart was a consultant to Boeing (1973–1980) during which time the Royal Navy acquired a hydrofoil HMS Speedy and the RAF acquired its first Chinooks.

He held directorships including at the Lancashire and Yorkshire Building Society and was a member at Lloyd's where he gained and lost large sums over a period of 20 years.

He was elected Master of the Worshipful Company of Grocers of the City of London. He finished 35th of 350 in the 1951 Monte Carlo Rally.

He proposed a method of suppressing hurricanes during their formation. His proposal involved covering 100 km^{2} (39 mi^{2}) of ocean with a reflective material using four aircraft, each with a 2 km wingspan. He was persuaded it would not work, so he switched the concept to putting out forest fires.

At the age of 88 he raised funds for a hospice near Exeter by abseiling down Cullompton church.

Goodhart married Lydia Sward in 1957 and Molly Copsey in 1975. He had three step-children from Molly, who had previously been married to another senior Navy officer : Alyson, Ian and Fiona.
