= Maniatis MPA =

1970s United States human-powered aircraft

- Takeoff attempt by the Maniatis MPA

General information
- Type: Human-powered aircraft
- National origin: United States
- Manufacturer: Michael Maniatis
- Number built: 1

History
- Introduction date: 1979

The Maniatis MPA was a human-powered aircraft that was built by Michael Maniatis in the late 1970s and tested at Mitchel Field, Long Island, New York. It did not fly.

== Description ==
The aircraft was a high-wing monoplane, with a pod-and-boom configuration. It was built from plastic, aluminum and styrofoam, and covered in clear plastic. The pilot sat in a recumbent position within a semi-enclosed fuselage, pedaling a set of bicycle pedals, and powering a two-bladed pusher propeller that was located at the end of the boom, aft of the rudder and elevator.

The aircraft was built at the Cradle of Aviation Museum, in Uniondale, New York, with construction taking two years. It was tested at Mitchel Field on Monday, November 5 1979, with Maniatis making six take-off attempts, none of which were successful.

The MPA was later placed in the collection of the Cradle of Aviation Museum.

== Specifications ==
Data from Newsday

General characteristics

- Crew: 1
- Wingspan: 74 ft (23 m)
- Empty weight: 90 lb (41 kg)
- Propellers: 2-bladed

Performance

== See also ==
Aircraft of comparable role, configuration, and era

- MacCready Gossamer Albatross
- MacCready Gossamer Condor

Related lists

- List of Human-powered aircraft
