= HPA Toucan =

1970s British two-seat human-powered aircraft

Toucan

General information
- Type: Two-seat Human-powered aircraft
- National origin: United Kingdom
- Manufacturer: Hertfordshire Pedal Aeronauts
- Number built: 1

History
- First flight: 23 December 1972

The HPA Toucan is a British two-seat human-powered aircraft built and flown by members of the Hertfordshire Pedal Aeronauts that was the first two-person human-powered aircraft to fly.

== Development ==
The Hertfordshire Pedal Aeronauts was formed in 1965, mainly from the staff of Handley Page Limited, to design and build a human-powered aircraft and to compete for the Kremer Prize. The aircraft, unique in being powered by two persons, was designed by Martyn Pressnell. Pressnell was at the time a stress engineer with Handley Page. Partly funded by a grant from the Royal Aeronautical Society construction began in 1967 and was completed in 1972. Following taxying trials at Radlett Aerodrome on 16 June 1972 when brief hops were made, the aircraft made its first flight on 23 December 1972. Flown by Bryan Bowen with Derek May as crewman the longest flight was 204 ft (62 m), the Toucan flew again on 3 July 1973 for 2,100 ft (640 m) and achieved a height of 15 to 20 ft (4.6 to 6.1 m).

== Design ==
The Toucan is a mid-wing cantilever monoplane with the fuselage a braced structure of spruce and balsa and covered with Melinex. The wing spars had spruce booms and plywood edges and the ribs were made from balsa and like the fuselage it was covered with Melenix. The landing gear was a non-retractable the main wheel and tailwheel in tandem, it also had small outrigger wheels under the wings. The two crew sit in tandem under a transparent removable cover, the power is generated by the two crew using bicycle pedals which were connected by chains to drive the main wheel and via a shaft a two-bladed balsa pusher propeller mounted at the rear of the tail unit.

== Specifications ==
Data from Jane's All the World's Aircraft 1973-74

General characteristics

- Crew: 2
- Length: 28 ft 8 in (8.74 m)
- Wingspan: 123 ft 0 in (37.49 m)
- Height: 13 ft 6 in (4.11 m)
- Wing area: 600 sq ft (55.7 m^{2})
- Empty weight: 210 lb (95 kg)
- Gross weight: 528 lb (239 kg)

Performance

- Maximum speed: 34 mph (54.5 km/h, 30 kn)
- Stall speed: 20 mph (32 km/h, 17 kn)

== See also ==
Aircraft of comparable role, configuration, and era

- Cook Musfly
- HMPAC Puffin
- Malliga 1
- MacCready Gossamer Albatross
- MacCready Gossamer Condor
- Goodhart Newbury Manflier
- Southend MPG Mayfly

Related lists

- List of Human-powered aircraft
