= Malliga 2 =

1970s Austrian human-powered aircraft

General information
- Type: Human-powered aircraft
- National origin: Austrian
- Manufacturer: Horst Josef Malliga
- Number built: 1

History
- First flight: 1972
- Developed from: Malliga 1

The Malliga 2 human powered aircraft was the project of Horst Josef Malliga, and was developed from his Malliga 1 design.

During the winter of 1971–72, the Malliga 1 craft was modified in order to achieve improved performance. Changes were made to the wingplan; the span was increased to 26 m (85 ft 10 in), with the new outer portions of the wing having both taper and dihedral. Lateral control was now achieved by the use of conventional ailerons. Other changes included raising the position of the propeller and increasing its diameter to 2.75 m (9 ft), which was as much as the existing twin-boom configuration would allow for.

The nomenclature to distinguish between the two iterations of Malliga's craft was not noted by contemporary English-language articles, but has been by subsequent Austrian references.

In 1972, an initial attempt to fly failed, due to inaccurate rigging of flying wires. This was corrected, and the craft later managed to achieve flights of up to 600 m (1,950 ft).

== Specifications (Malliga 2) ==
Data from Jane's all the world's aircraft 1973-74

General characteristics

- Crew: 1
- Length: 16 ft 5 in (5.00 m)
- Wingspan: 85 ft 4 in (26.00 m)
- Height: 9 ft 10 in (3.00 m)
- Wing area: 320 sq ft (30 m^{2})
- Empty weight: 132 lb (60 kg)
- Gross weight: 276 lb (125 kg)

Performance

- Cruise speed: 18 mph (29 km/h, 16 kn)

== See also ==
- SUMPAC
- HMPAC Puffin
- List of human-powered aircraft
