= HVS (aircraft) =

1980s German human-powered aircraft

General information
- Type: Human-powered aircraft
- National origin: Germany
- Manufacturer: Wolfang Hütter, Franz Villinger, Wilhelm Schüle
- Designer: Wolfang Hütter, Franz Villinger
- Status: On display
- Number built: 1

History
- First flight: June 20, 1982

The HVS was a human-powered aircraft, designed and built by three German aeronautical professionals. Its name comes from the surnames of those involved; Wolfang Hütter (de), Franz Villinger (de), and Wilhelm Schüle. Villinger co-designed the 1930s HV-1 Mufli (de) human-powered aircraft.

== Development ==
Work on the aircraft commenced in October 1974, with its construction reportedly taking 15,000 working hours. The HVS was a shoulder-wing monoplane, with the tapered wing featuring a shallow inverted gull wing configuration. The aircraft made extensive use of foam, plastics, GRP, and carbon fibre in its construction. The fuselage had a pod and boom configuration. The empennage was of the V-tail type, with that providing both directional and pitch control. Ailerons on the outboard wings provided lateral control. The pilot, seated in a recumbent position, operated a set of reciprocating treadles to power a variable pitch pusher propeller mounted on a pylon near the rear of the fuselage. The propeller was made of Kevlar and built by engineering student Oskar Staudenmayer. The entire wing could be lifted off, to facilitate pilot access.

The aircraft first flew on 20 June 1982 at the Leipheim Luftwaffe base in Bavaria. Its longest flight was achieved on 4 December 1982, when Oskar Staudenmayer flew it for a distance of 720 m (2,362 ft). The HVS was built with a higher wing loading, and had greater flight speeds, than most contemporary HPAs, and was notable for being able to fly in windy conditions, including in winds greater than its own airspeed.

The aircraft is now on display at the Technik Museum Sinsheim, in Sinsheim, Germany.

== Specifications ==
Data from Jane's all the world's aircraft 1984-85, and Free Flight

General characteristics

- Crew: 1
- Length: 18 ft 1 in (5.5 m)
- Wingspan: 53 ft (16 m)
- Wing area: 152.4 sq ft (14.16 m^{2})
- Aspect ratio: 18.4
- Airfoil: Wortmann FX63-137
- Empty weight: 114.6 lb (52 kg)
- Max takeoff weight: 242.5 lb (110 kg)
- Powerplant: 1 × Cyclist pilot
- Propellers: 2-bladed, 5 ft 3 in (1.60 m) diameter

Performance

- Cruise speed: 22 mph (35 km/h, 19 kn)
- Lift-to-drag: 36:1
- Wing loading: 1.58 lb/sq ft (7.70 kg/m^{2})

== See also ==
Aircraft of comparable role, configuration, and era

- MacCready Gossamer Albatross
- MacCready Gossamer Condor
- MIT Daedalus
- Musculair 1
- Musculair 2

Related lists

- List of Human-powered aircraft
