= Zinno Olympian ZB-1 =

1970s United States human-powered aircraft

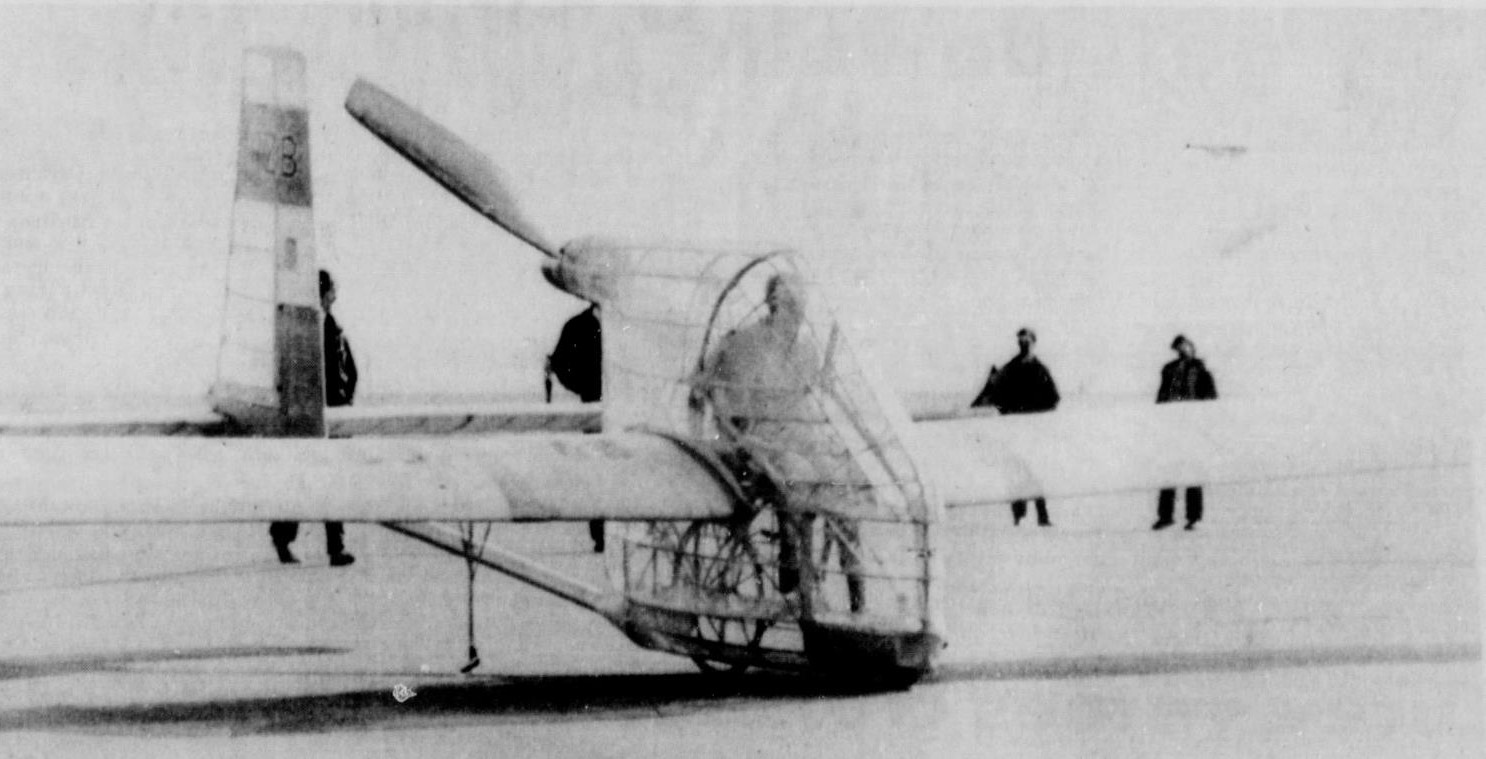
- The Olympian during an unsuccessful takeoff attempt on April 15, 1976

General information
- Type: Human-powered aircraft
- National origin: United States
- Manufacturer: Joseph A. Zinno & Associates
- Designer: Joseph A. Zinno
- Number built: 1

History
- First flight: April 21, 1976

The Olympian ZB-1 was the first human-powered aircraft to have flown in the United States. It was designed, built, and flown by Joseph A. Zinno, of North Providence, Rhode Island. Zinno had previously been a USAF Lieutenant Colonel, and undertook the challenge of making a human-powered aircraft as a post-retirement project.

== Design and development ==
Design work began in January 1972 with construction, said to have involved 7,000 hours, commencing in March 1973.

The aircraft was a mid-wing monoplane, with a pod and boom configuration. The fuselage's primary structure was made from light alloy tubing, whereas the wing's had a box-spar made from wood and plywood. The secondary structure was made using aluminum, wood, ply, foam and plastics. The entire aircraft was covered in a transparent plastic film. The wing had a complex planform, consisting of four separate sections, of varying tapers and chords. A high camber Wortmann airfoil, the FX72-150, was used inboard near the wing-root while, further outboard, the more efficient Wortmann FX63-137 section was selected. Zinno stated this was "to compensate for the hellatious diving moment".

The pilot sat in a recumbent position, and operated a reciprocating pedal drive system, to power a two bladed variable-pitch pusher propeller, located at the rear of the streamlined nacelle. A boom at the base of the nacelle extended to the empennage at the rear. Directional control was by a fin-mounted counter-balanced rudder. Pitch control was by an all-flying tail-plane fitted to the trailing edge of the tailfin. Lateral control was attained by wingtip ailerons. The undercarriage consisted of two bicycle wheels arranged in tandem, while two small wheels, on outriggers, were positioned underneath the wing.

== Flight tests ==
Last flight of the Zinno Olympian ZB-1

On January 16, 1976, the FAA gave the aircraft an Airworthiness Certificate with the registration NIZB. Flight tests were conducted at the Quonset Point Air National Guard Station in Rhode Island, with Zinno acting as pilot. A series of taxiing trials began on April 15. On the morning of April 21, during its fourth run of the day, the Olympian flew for 5 seconds. The distance covered was variously reported to have been between 33 and 100 feet (10 and 30 meters). During landing, the aircraft suffered a ground loop, which damaged the undercarriage and other components.

Further tests were conducted in September 1976, with the aircraft making towed flights. On its final flight, the right wing suffered a structural failure of the wing-spar, at its root, damaging the aircraft beyond repair.

== Specifications ==
Data from Jane's all the world's aircraft 1976–77

General characteristics

- Crew: 1
- Length: 21 ft 6 in (6.55 m)
- Wingspan: 78 ft 6 in (23.93 m)
- Height: 8 ft (2.4 m)
- Wing area: 312 sq ft (29.0 m^{2})
- Airfoil: Wortmann FX72-150 (inboard), Wortmann FX63-137 (outboard)
- Empty weight: 148 lb (67 kg)
- Gross weight: 290 lb (132 kg)
- Propellers: 2-bladed, 8 ft 8 in (2.64 m) diameter

Performance

- Maximum speed: 22 mph (35 km/h, 19 kn)
- Cruise speed: 19 mph (31 km/h, 17 kn)
- Stall speed: 15 mph (24 km/h, 13 kn)
- Never exceed speed: 39 mph (63 km/h, 34 kn)
- Wing loading: 0.93 lb/sq ft (4.5 kg/m^{2})

== See also ==
Aircraft of comparable role, configuration, and era

- Kohm Lady Godiva
- MacCready Gossamer Albatross
- MacCready Gossamer Condor
- MIT Chrysalis
- MIT Daedalus

Related lists

- List of human-powered aircraft
