= Dash (disambiguation) =

A dash is a punctuation mark.

Dash or DASH may also refer to:

== Brands and enterprises ==
- Dash (boutique), a boutique clothing and accessory chain
- Dash (detergent)
- Amazon Dash, a consumer goods ordering service from Amazon.com
- DoorDash, an online food ordering and delivery company which trades on the Nasdaq as DASH
- Mrs. Dash, a brand name of seasoning marketed by B&G Foods

== Fictional characters ==
- Dash Parr, in the film The Incredibles
- Dash (Transformers), in Transformers
- Dash Baxter, in the cartoon Danny Phantom
- Dash Boardman, in the film Cars
- Dash Riprock, in the television series The Beverly Hillbillies
- Rainbow Dash, in the My Little Pony television series
- Dash, in the British television series Thomas & Friends
- Dash, one of the PBS Kids mascots from 1999 until 2013

== Organizations ==
- Democratic Movement for Change, an Israeli political party
- Design and Architecture High School, Miami, Florida, US

== Military ==
- Display And Sight Helmet, a helmet for fighter pilots
- Gyrodyne QH-50 DASH (Drone Anti-Submarine Helicopter), a military drone helicopter
- USS Dash (AM-88), a United States Navy minesweeper launched 20 June 1942
- USS Dash (AM-428), a United States Navy minesweeper launched 20 September 1952

== Science and technology ==
- Dash, an element in Morse code
- DASH diet (Dietary Approaches to Stop Hypertension), a diet promoted by the National Institutes of Health to prevent and control hypertension
- Dash Express, a GPS device by Dash Navigation
- DASH7, a low power wireless sensor networking technology
- Digital Audio Stationary Head, a digital audio tape format
- Dynamic allele-specific hybridization, a method of genetic analysis
- Long dash skipper (Limochores mystic), a butterfly

=== Computing ===
- Dash (shell) (Debian Almquist shell), a Linux shell
- Desktop and mobile Architecture for System Hardware, a computing standard
- Dynamic Adaptive Streaming over HTTP (DASH), (aka MPEG-DASH, DASH Audio, or DASH Video), a multimedia streaming standard
- Unity Dash, a component of the Unity user interface for the Ubuntu operating system
- Sony Dash, an Internet device
- T-Mobile Dash, a smartphone
- Dash, an analytical web app library by Plotly
- Dash (cryptocurrency), an open source peer-to-peer cryptocurrency and decentralized autonomous organization

== Sport ==
- Dash, a sprint race
- Houston Dash, a professional women's soccer team based in Houston, Texas
- Winston-Salem Dash, a Minor League Baseball team based in Winston-Salem, North Carolina.

== Transportation ==
=== Aircraft ===
- de Havilland Canada Dash series
  - De Havilland Canada Dash 7, a Canadian turboprop aircraft
  - De Havilland Canada Dash 8, a Canadian turboprop aircraft
- Dash 80, early jet aircraft
- DaSH PA, a human-powered airplane project

=== Locomotives ===
- EMD Dash 2, a line of diesel-electric locomotives by GE
- GE Dash 7 Series, a 1970s line of locomotives by GE
- GE Dash 8 Series, a 1980s line of locomotives by GE
- GE Dash 9 Series, a 1990s line of locomotives by GE

=== Motor vehicles ===
- Dash, a series of firefighting apparatus (trucks) produced by Pierce Manufacturing
- Dashboard or dash, an automobile component

=== Public transportation ===
- DASH (Virginia), a public transportation system in Alexandria, Virginia, US
- DASH, a bus service operated by the Los Angeles Department of Transportation in California, US
- DASH, a bus route operated by The Rapid in Grand Rapids, Michigan, US
- Downtown Area Shuttle, a shuttle bus service in downtown Hartford, Connecticut, US

=== Roads ===
- Damansara–Shah Alam Elevated Expressway ("DASH"), an expressway in Klang Valley, Malaysia

== People ==
=== Surname ===
- Dash (rapper), American rapper (Darien Dash born 1992)
- Anil Dash (born 1975), American writer
- Charlene Dash, African-American model
- Damon Dash (born 1971), American music executive
- George Dash (1871–1959), New Zealand politician
- Jack Dash (1906–1989), British trade union leader
- Julie Dash (born 1952), American filmmaker
- Julian Dash (1916–1974), American saxophonist
- Leon Dash (born 1944), American journalist
- Mike Dash (born 1963), British writer
- Paul Dash (born 1946), Barbados-born British artist
- Samuel Dash (1925–2004), American lawyer
- Sarah Dash (1945–2021), American singer
- Stacey Dash (born 1966), American actress

=== Given name ===
- Dash Shaw (born 1983), American comic book writer

=== Nickname ===
- Dash Crofts (1938–2026), American musician
- Dashiell Hammett (1894–1961), American writer, screenwriter and political activist
- Dash Mihok (born 1974), American actor
- Dash Snow (1981–2009), American artist
- Fred Waite (1853–1895), American cowboy, member of Billy the Kid's gang and later Chickasaw Nation legislator and attorney general

=== Ring name ===
- Dash Chisako, ring name of Japanese professional wrestler Chisako Jumonji (born 1988)
- Dash Wilder, ring name of American professional wrestler Daniel Wheeler (born 1987)

== Other uses ==
- Dash (cooking), a unit of measurement used in cooking
- Dash (collie), a dog owned by Caroline Harrison
- Dash (spaniel), a dog owned by Queen Victoria
- Dash (Hori7on song), 2023
- Dash (Nmixx song), 2024
- Dash!, a Japanese manga comic
- The Dash, an English post-punk band
- Pebble dash, a surface used on outside walls
- Sonic Dash, a 2013 video game
- Dash Berlin, Dutch trance band
- Dash, a mascot of PBS Kids from 1999 to 2013

== See also ==
- D-A-CH, three territorial entities where German is an official language
- Daesh, a Salafi jihadist former unrecognised proto-state and militant group (aka ISIS and ISIL)
- DASHED, a food delivery service
- Dashiell, a given name and a surname
