= HVS =

HVS may refer to:

- Hard Very Severe, a British climbing grade
- Hartsville Regional Airport's IATA code
- Haversine, a trigonometric function
- Heaviside step function
- Helenium virus S
- High vaginal swab
- High Voltage Software
- Hilversum railway station, Netherlands, station code
- Hrvatski vaterpolski savez or Croatian Water Polo Federation
- Hrvatski veslački savez or Croatian Rowing Federation
- Human visual system model
- HVS (aircraft), a 1980s German human-powered aircraft
- HVS Global Hospitality Services
- Hypervelocity star
- Hyperventilation syndrome
