= Zinno =

Zinno may refer to:

- Anthony Zinno, an American poker player
- Zinno Olympian ZB-1, a 1970s United States human-powered aircraft
