= Goodhart Newbury Manflier =

1970s British twin-fuselage human-powered aircraft

Newbury Manflier

General information
- Type: Human-powered aircraft
- National origin: United Kingdom
- Designer: Nicholas Goodhart
- Number built: 1

History
- First flight: November 1979

The Goodhart Newbury Manflier was a two-place human-powered aircraft designed by Nicholas Goodhart. Its most notable feature was that the two pilots were placed in separate fuselages, spaced 70 ft apart.

== Design and development ==
The genesis of the aircraft was detailed in a paper presented at a 1974 conference hosted by the Man-Powered Aircraft Group of the Royal Aeronautical Society, and later published in its Journal. In the paper, after initially describing the requirements for an aircraft to win the Kremer Prize then on offer, Goodhart proposed a two-person monoplane, with a 100 ft wingspan, with each pilot being located in separate nacelles at the wingtips. This configuration would reduce the bending moments on the wing spar, and hence the overall weight. Turning radius would be in the order of 1,000 ft, and with each pilot generating 0.20 hp (or 140 watts) to maintain flight.

The design evolved, so that when construction of the Newbury Manflier commenced in November 1976, the span had increased, and the location of the nacelles moved to approximately half-way between the centre of the craft and the wingtips. Each pilot sat in their own fuselage, sitting atop of an aluminium-framed bicycle and pedalling a two bladed pusher propeller, located at rear of a fairing. Pitch control was achieved by all-flying elevators located at the end of tail booms. Lateral control would be accomplished by warping the outboard wings. There were no rudders, with the oversized propeller fairings acting as tailfins. Directional control was to be achieved by one pilot pedalling faster than the other. Construction was of aluminium tubing, spruce, styrofoam, balsa, with the covering being transparent plastic. The craft was designed to be disassembled into six pieces for easy storage and transportation.

The Newbury Manflier first flew in November 1979, at RAF Greenham Common. The project was halted soon after due to hangar space at the base no longer being available, and the success of the American Gossamer aircraft limiting what was left to achieve. A number of the aircraft components are held by the Science Museum at the National Collections Centre at Wroughton.

== Documentary ==
A 30 minute documentary on the Newbury Manflier was produced by BBC South. Called Project Manflier, the documentary was filmed between November 1978 and April 1981, and included coverage of the aircraft's initial taxiing trials, three of the flight trials, and its disassembly. The reporter and narrator was Mike Debens, and the producer was John Frost. The programme was first broadcast on BBC Two on 15 August 1981.

== Specifications ==
Data from The Formation Flight of Human Powered Aircraft across the English Channel in the Spring

General characteristics

- Crew: 2
- Wingspan: 137.8 ft (42.0 m)
- Wing area: 648.3 sq ft (60.23 m^{2})
- Aspect ratio: 29.3
- Empty weight: 160 lb (73 kg)
- Gross weight: 460 lb (209 kg)

Performance

- Cruise speed: 16 mph (26 km/h, 14 kn)
- Wing loading: 0.71 lb/sq ft (3.5 kg/m^{2})

== See also ==
Aircraft of comparable role, configuration, and era

- Cook Musfly
- HMPAC Puffin
- Malliga 1
- HPA Toucan
- MacCready Gossamer Albatross
- MacCready Gossamer Condor
