= Laviolette =

Laviolette can refer to:

== Places ==
- Laviolette Bridge, linking Trois-Rivières and Bécancour via Autoroute 55 in Quebec, Canada
- Laviolette (electoral district), a provincial electoral district in Quebec, Canada
- Asteroid 21550 Laviolette

== People ==
- Jace LaViolette (born 2003), American baseball player
- Jack Laviolette (1879–1960), former National Hockey League player
- Jacqueline Laviolette, member of American pop group, Girl Authority
- Marc Laviolette, former mayor of Ottawa, Ontario
- Peter Laviolette (born 1964), an American former professional ice hockey defenseman and current head coach of the New York Rangers
- Sieur de Laviolette (fl. 1634–36), the first commandant of Trois-Rivières, Quebec

== See also ==
- Smolkowski-Laviolette biplane, a 1960s Canadian human-powered aircraft
