= Upenieks Oscillocopter =

1970s Australian human-powered ornithopter

Oscillocopter
- Side view of the Oscillocopter 1

General information
- Type: Human-powered aircraft
- National origin: Australia
- Manufacturer: Harijs Upenieks
- Number built: 3

History
- Introduction date: 1970s

The Oscillocopter was the name given to a series of human-powered ornithopters designed and built by Harijs Upenieks in the 1970s.

== Development ==
Upenieks, based in Western Australia, developed a design concept for ornithopters, where power supplied by a pilot would work in concert with sets of elastic bungees in order to create a harmonic oscillating motion of the wings. The pilot was to apply motion to hinged wings by pulling directly on flying wires that connected the wing-spar to a pivoted strut which was worked by the pilot's legs. Three sets of bungees – one located above the wings, the second below them, and the third to the pivoted strut – were intended to provide a balanced power system, and work in sympathy with the pilot's efforts. Upenieks believed his concept would work best with the hang glider-style of aircraft.

Articles, he authored, detailing his ideas appeared in the Royal Aeronautical Society's Aeronautical Journal and in the Australian Flying magazine. In 1971 he applied for an Australian patent, with AU4473672A being granted in 1974.

== Oscillocopter 1 ==
Front quarter view of Oscillocopter 1

Built in 1972, the ornithopter was a high-wing canard monoplane. It spanned 14 m (46 ft) and weighed 85 kg (187 lb). The pilot was located underneath the wing, in a seated position, and was able to actuate the wings by manipulating cables connecting the wing-spar to a pivoted undercarriage strut.

A long curved boom formed the basis of the fuselage, with the fore-plane attached to front, and a single all-moving tailfin located to the rear. The wings had aluminum tube spars, ribs of curved bamboo battens, and were covered by two layers of paper tissue applied either side of a nylon fishing net. The fore-plane was made of two independently controlled panels, an approach inspired by the 1923 Platz glider, and which were controlled by two twist grips fitted to a control bar.

Testing took place at Witchcliffe, Western Australia. According to Upenieks, there was "abundant enthusiasm but a lack of everything else". The lack of lateral control, along with difficulty balancing on a single wheel undercarriage made testing problematic. Additionally construction issues led to the main boom of the fuselage failing, and to the craft being abandoned.

== Oscillocopter 2 ==
Rear quarter view of Oscillocopter 2

Upenieks' second design was of conventional configuration, with it having a cruciform tail. The wing spars were made from aluminium yacht mast blanks, with the wing covering made from Dacron sail material. The aircraft spanned 43.75 ft (13.34 m) and had a wing area of 245 sq ft (22.8 m^{2}). Tests conducted with the craft tethered against prevailing winds showed that a wind speed of 15 km/h (9.3 mph) allowed the craft to lift off the ground, though with the operators legs still on the ground. Difficulties in controlling the aircraft resulted in the tail being replaced with V-tail design, with each panel of the tail being individually controlled. During testing, a gust of wind damaged the aircraft beyond reasonable repair.

== Oscillocopter 3 ==
Rear quarter view of Oscillocopter 3

This iteration retained the spars and wings of the Oscillocopter 2, but featured a new fuselage. It was tested in rural York, Western Australia in 1975. The craft was initially tested statically, with pilots being able to achieve a flapping rate of 60 Hz. Later outdoor tests, with the craft being tethered, were conducted against the prevailing wind. During the course of these, elevons were fitted to the outboard section of the wing spar, enabling lateral control. A wind speed of 10 km/h (6.2 mph) allowed the unoccupied aircraft to rise off the ground, while a wind speed of 25 km/h (16 mph) generated sufficient lift for the aircraft, with an operator aboard, to lift off the ground "even if only for brief moments".

The illustrations used for Upenieks' patent are based on the Oscillocopter 3 design.

== See also ==
Aircraft of comparable role, configuration, and era

- Hartman Ikarus
