= Keith Sherwin =

English academic and author (1937–2025)

- Born: 1937
- Died: 7 April 2025 (aged 87–88)
- Education: Lanchester Polytechnic
- Known for: academic, author

Keith Sherwin (1937 – 7 April 2025) was an English academic and author of publications promoting human-powered aircraft and engineering textbooks.

== Early life and education ==
Sherwin was educated at the Anthony Gell School in Derbyshire between 1948 and 1953.

=== Higher education ===
In 1958 he gained a Higher National Certificate at Derby Technical College. In 1961 he received a Bachelor of Science from University College, Swansea. In 1968 he gained a Ph.D. from Lanchester Polytechnic, Coventry.

== Career ==
In 1968, he was appointed to the Department of Mechanical Engineering at the University of Liverpool. In 1969, he implemented a design project for mechanical engineering undergraduates in the second year of a three-year degree course, to design and build a 'sporting' human-powered aircraft. A donation of the remains of the HMPAC Puffin II allowed the group to incorporate elements of that craft into their own design, which was called the Liverpuffin. The aircraft was completed by December 1971, but during taxiing trials on 17 December, a gust of wind flipped the craft, causing significant damage. Repairs took two months, with trials re-commencing in March 1972. The craft only flew once, with Sherwin as a pilot, covering 15 m (49 ft) on 18 March 1972.

During the 1970s, Sherwin authored several articles and books on the topic of human-powered flight, with the Liverpuffin being incorporated into his writings. His first book - Man-powered flight - was published in 1971 and canvassed technical and engineering issues which HPAs had to contend with. New editions of it appeared in 1975 and in 2007. His second book - To fly like a bird - appeared in 1975 and was non-technical in nature, with it surveying recent HPA projects and analysing their success or otherwise.

In the 1980s, Sherwin took up a position with the Nanyang Technological Institute and while there implemented an undergraduate programme for human-powered aircraft, resulting in the building and flying of the Aslam human-powered aircraft.

In 2007, Sherwin published his third HPA book - Pedal Powered Planes - with it incorporating details of significant HPAs which dated from the late 1970s on through to the 1990s.

== Death ==
Sherwin died on 7 April 2025.

=== Books ===
==== Human-powered aircraft ====
- — (1971). Man-powered flight. Hemel Hempstead, England: Model & Allied Publications Ltd. ISBN 9780853440468.
- — (1971). Man-powered flight (revised reprint 1975 ed.). Hemel Hempstead, England: Model & Allied Publications Ltd. ISBN 0852424361.
- — (1976). To fly like a bird: The story of man-powered aircraft. Folkestone, England: Bailey Brothers and Swinfen Ltd. ISBN 0561002835.
- — (2007). Pedal powered planes. Matlock, Derbyshire: Scarfin Books. ISBN 9781900446105.
- — (2015). Man-powered flight (PDF) (BHPFC reprint ed.). Model & Allied Publications Ltd.

==== Engineering textbooks ====
- — (1982). Engineering design for performance. New York, NY: John Wiley & Sons Inc. ISBN 9780470275344.
- — (1995). Introduction to thermodynamics. London, UK: Chapman & Hall. ISBN 0412476401.
- — & Johnson, Anthony (1996). Foundations of mechanical engineering. London, UK: Chapman & Hall. ISBN 0412616009.
- — & Horsley, Michael (1996). Thermofluids. London, UK: Chapman & Hall. ISBN 0412637502.
- Hulse, Ray; — & Cain, Jack (2003). Solid Mechanics. Basingstoke, England: Palgrave Macmillan. ISBN 0333971167.

=== Articles ===
==== Human-powered aircraft ====
- — (April 1972). "Man-Powered Flight as a Sporting Activity". AIAA Student Journal. Vol. 10, no. 2. New York, NY: American Institute of Aeronautics and Astronautics. pp. 27–32.
- — (October 1972). "Man-Powered Flight - A New World's Record". AIAA Student Journal. Vol. 10, no. 3. New York, NY: American Institute of Aeronautics and Astronautics. p. 23.
- — (1974). "A major undergraduate engineering design project". The International Journal of Mechanical Engineering Education. Vol. 2, no. 1. Manchester, UK: University of Manchester Institute of Science and Technology. pp. 1–19.
- Palmer, R.S.J. & — (March 1986). "Man-powered flight in South-East Asia". Aerospace. London, UK: Royal Aeronautical Society. pp. nk. ISSN 2052-451X.
