= SUMPAC =

British human-powered aircraft

Coordinates: 50.89798°N 1.39292°W

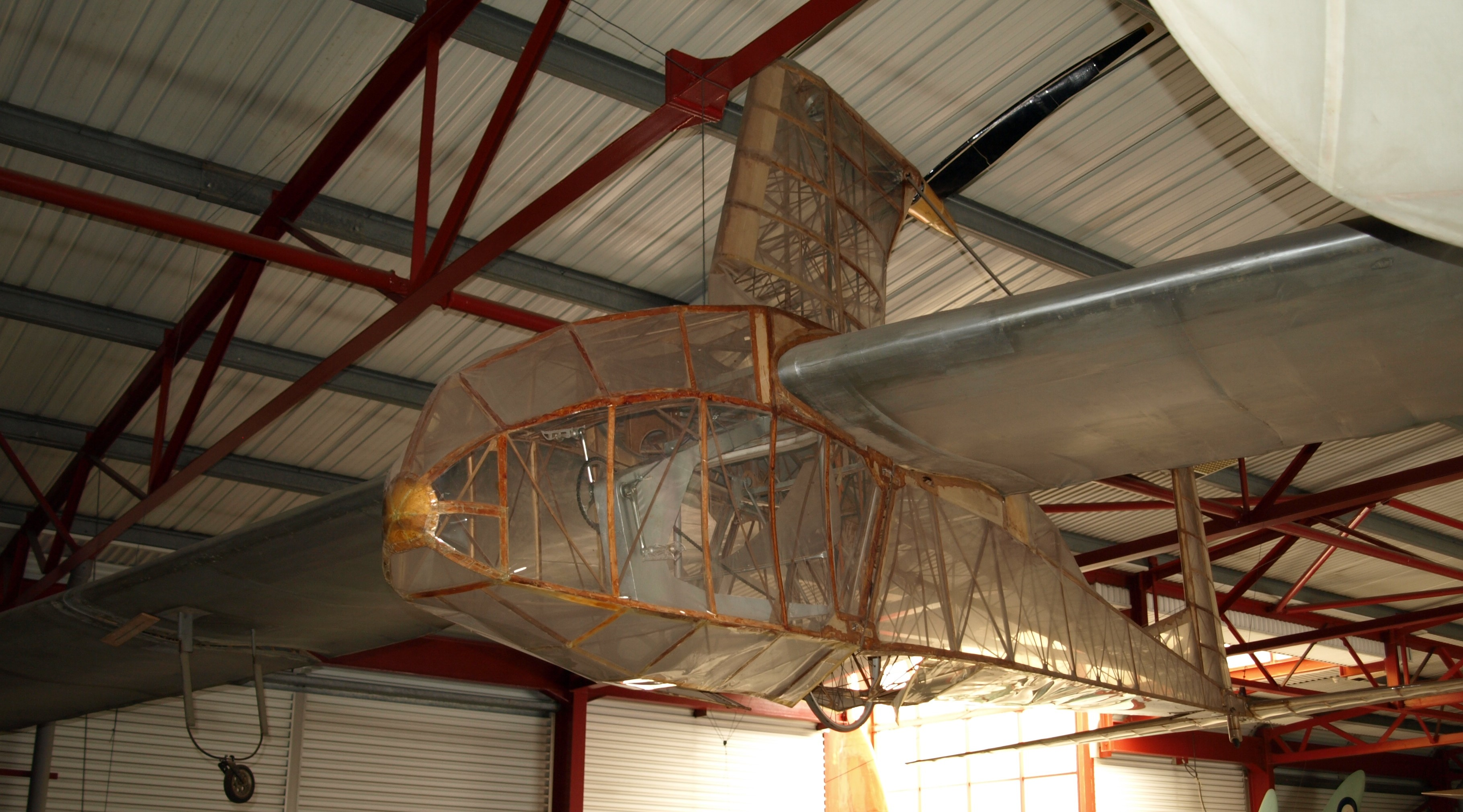
- SUMPAC on display at the Solent Sky museum.

General information
- Type: Human-powered aircraft
- Number built: 1

History
- First flight: 9 November 1961

The Southampton University Man Powered Aircraft (or SUMPAC) on 9 November 1961 became the first human-powered aeroplane to make an officially authenticated take-off and flight. It was designed and built by Southampton university students between 1960 and 1961 for an attempt at the Kremer prize, but it was never able to complete the 'figure-of-eight' course specified to claim the prize money.

== Design and development ==
The aircraft was designed and built by a team of post-graduate students from Southampton University. Intended to compete for the £50,000 Kremer Prize (requiring successful completion of a one-mile (1.6 km) 'figure of eight' course) the project was funded by the Royal Aeronautical Society.

The aircraft is of conventional configuration, with the exception of a pylon mounted pusher propeller, and is constructed from balsa, plywood and aluminium alloy. Originally covered with silver-doped Nylon the aircraft now sports a transparent plastic skin on the fuselage.

The SUMPAC was powered using pedals and chains to drive a large two-bladed propeller. Piloted by noted gliding instructor and test pilot Derek Piggott, its first flight on 9 November 1961 at Lasham airfield covered a distance of 70 yards (64 m) and climbed to a height of six feet (1.8 m). The longest flight made was 650 yards (594 m) rising to a maximum height of 15 ft (4.6 m). Turns were attempted, with 80 degrees the best achieved. A total of 40 flights were made by SUMPAC. After a crash in 1963 which caused damage to the fragile structure it was decided to retire the aircraft although it had been repaired.

The SUMPAC is currently on display at the Solent Sky museum; it was loaned for some time to the Shuttleworth Collection but now resides in its hometown of Southampton.

== Specifications ==
Data from The World's Sailplanes:Die Segelflugzeuge der Welt:Les Planeurs du Monde Volume II

General characteristics

- Crew: 1
- Length: 24 ft 9 in (7.54 m)
- Wingspan: 80 ft 1 in (24.4 m)
- Wing area: 300 sq ft (27.9 m^{2})
- Aspect ratio: 21.3
- Airfoil: NACA 65_{a} 818
- Empty weight: 128 lb (58.1 kg)
- Gross weight: 268 lb (121.6 kg)

Performance

- Never exceed speed: 21 mph (33 km/h, 18 kn)
- g limits: +1.5 -1 at 16.4 mph; 14.3 kn (26.4 km/h)
- Maximum glide ratio: 34 at 65 mph; 57 kn (105 km/h)
- Rate of sink: 37 ft/min (0.19 m/s) at 17 mph; 15 kn (27 km/h)
- Lift-to-drag: 36 at 20 mph; 17 kn (32 km/h)
- Wing loading: 0.89 lb/sq ft (4.35 kg/m^{2})

== See also ==
Aircraft of comparable role, configuration, and era

- HMPAC Puffin
- HPA Toucan
- Malliga 1
- MacCready Gossamer Albatross
- MacCready Gossamer Condor
- Goodhart Newbury Manflier
- Southend MPG Mayfly

Related lists

- List of human-powered aircraft
