= Pitts Sky Car =

Sky Car

General information
- Type: Ornithopter
- National origin: United States
- Manufacturer: John W. Pitts
- Number built: 1

History
- Introduction date: 1928

The Pitts Sky Car was an unsuccessful aircraft designed for vertical take off, by inventor John W. Pitts of Detroit, Michigan.

Pitts filed a United States patent in 1924 for a propeller, "which will cause an immediate vertical lift of any aerial car to which the propeller is attached". This consisted of a "mushroom-shaped" rotor of 60 blades, each hinged at the root. An engine would rotate and reciprocate the propeller, causing the blades to close on the downstroke and open on the upstroke, which it was hoped would induce lift. The patent was granted in October 1926.

In collaboration with W. P. Kindree, Pitts constructed a 2,700 lb (1,200 kg) prototype with a 90 hp (67 kW) Curtiss OX-5 engine. A newsreel of 1928 shows the Sky Car attempting to fly; however rather than take off, it merely jumps up and down.

== In popular culture ==
Today, footage of the ill-fated Sky Car is often compiled with footage of the Gerhardt Cycleplane, various ornithopters, cyclogyros and other contraptions, and often cited as examples of early failed flight attempts, though in reality these took place 25 years after the first successful flights by the Wright Brothers. Famous movies in which the Sky Car can be briefly seen include Those Magnificent Men in Their Flying Machines and Airplane!.
