= DUT Icarus 001 =

Icarus 001

General information
- Type: Human Powered aircraft
- National origin: Netherlands
- Manufacturer: Delft University of Technology - (DUT)
- Number built: 1

The DUT Icarus 001 is a concept human powered aircraft, to be built from the cooperation between the Delft University of Technology and the Movement Science Faculty of the University of Maastricht.

This new HPA is innovative as two pilots are used instead of one to control the plane and as an embedded software system, as well as efficient composite materials and moving parts (wings, propeller and drivetrain) are used.

== See also ==
- List of human-powered aircraft
