= Bryan Allen (hang glider) =

Hang glider pilot

Bryan L. Allen
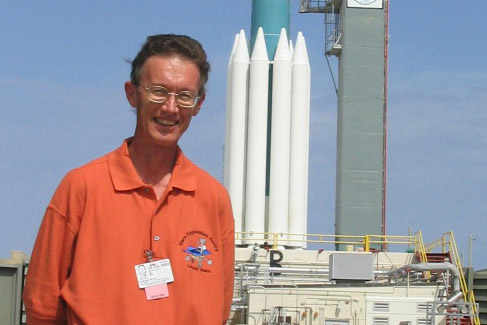
- Bryan Allen while at NASA
- Born: October 13, 1952 (age 73)
- Education: Tulare Union High School; College of the Sequoias; Cal State Bakersfield

Bryan Lewis Allen (born October 13, 1952) is an American self-taught hang glider pilot and cyclist. He achieved fame when he piloted (and provided the human power for) the two aircraft that won the first two Kremer prizes for human-powered flight: the Gossamer Condor (1977; the first human-powered aircraft that met the specified criteria of the first Kremer prize) and Gossamer Albatross (1979; the first human-powered aircraft to cross the English Channel). He later set world distance and duration records in a small pedal-powered blimp named "White Dwarf."

== Biography ==
Allen graduated from Tulare Union High School in Tulare, California. He then attended the College of the Sequoias, and Cal State Bakersfield.

As of 2018, he was employed by the Jet Propulsion Laboratory in Pasadena, California, working as a software engineer in the area of Mars exploration.

== Honors ==
In 2025, Allen was inducted as an honorary fellow of the Society of Experimental Test Pilots.
