= Kohm Lady Godiva =

1980s United States human-powered aircraft

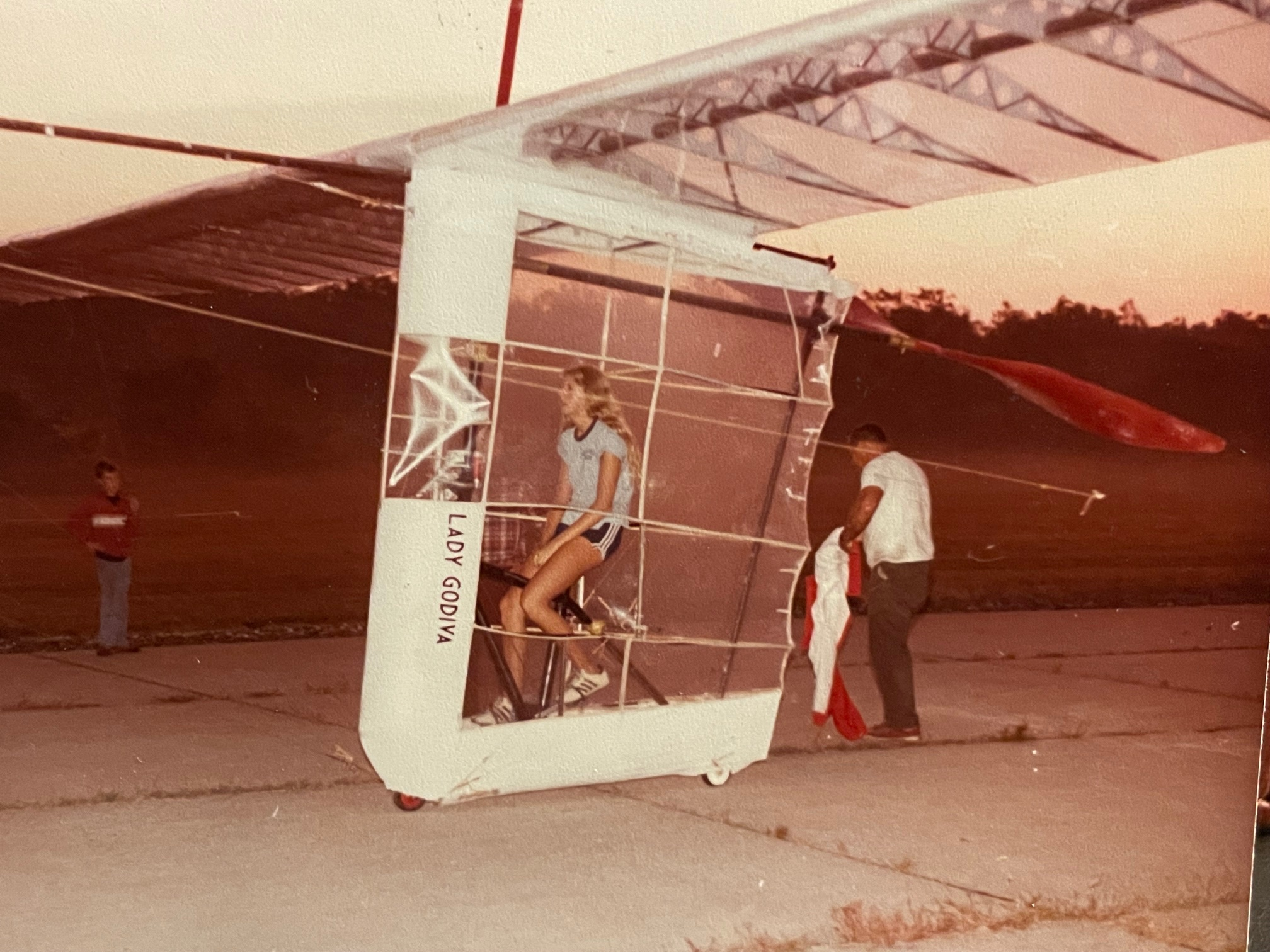
- Christina Kohm in the pilot's seat of the Lady Godiva

General information
- Type: Human-powered aircraft
- National origin: United States
- Manufacturer: Thomas Kohm
- Number built: 1

History
- First flight: 1982

The Lady Godiva is a human-powered aircraft built in the early 1980s by Thomas Kohm of Huntington, New York. It is a replica of the MacCready Gossamer Albatross.

Kohm had been a physics teacher at Cold Spring Harbor High School and, along with a group of his students, was inspired by the success of the Albatross to make a copy of it. As their project advanced, Kohm decided that the craft would be the "first girl-powered plane", with the role of pilot eventually being taken by his teenage daughter, Christina 'Christy' Kohm. The craft acquired the name Lady Godiva, due to her wearing minimal clothing, when she was piloting the craft.

Construction began in 1981, with the first flight taking place at the Brookhaven Municipal Airport in July 1982. The best flight occurred on October 1, 1982, when it flew for 4 minutes 30 seconds. The aircraft was constructed from graphite fibre tubing, mylar, stryofoam, and balsa. It was modified three times, and also underwent rebuilds due to crashes, with the empty weight of the craft increasing 25 lbs (11.3 kg) due to that.

The Long Island cable news station TV6 featured the Kohms and their aircraft on the program "Huntington Profiles" on the evening of Friday, August 13, 1982.

A New York Times article, dating from September 1983, detailed the Kohms' hope that they would be able to make a crossing of the Long Island Sound with it. The Lady Godiva was later placed in the collection of the Cradle of Aviation Museum, in Uniondale, New York.

== Specifications ==
Data from New York Times

General characteristics

- Crew: 1
- Length: 32 ft (9.8 m)
- Wingspan: 103 ft (31 m)
- Empty weight: 85 lb (39 kg)
- Gross weight: 225 lb (102 kg)
- Propellers: 2-bladed

Performance

- Maximum speed: 15 mph (24 km/h, 13 kn)
- Cruise speed: 13 mph (21 km/h, 11 kn)
- Stall speed: 11 mph (18 km/h, 9.6 kn)

== See also ==
Aircraft of comparable role, configuration, and era

- MacCready Gossamer Albatross
- MacCready Gossamer Condor

Related lists

- List of human-powered aircraft
