= DaSH PA =

American human-powered aircraft

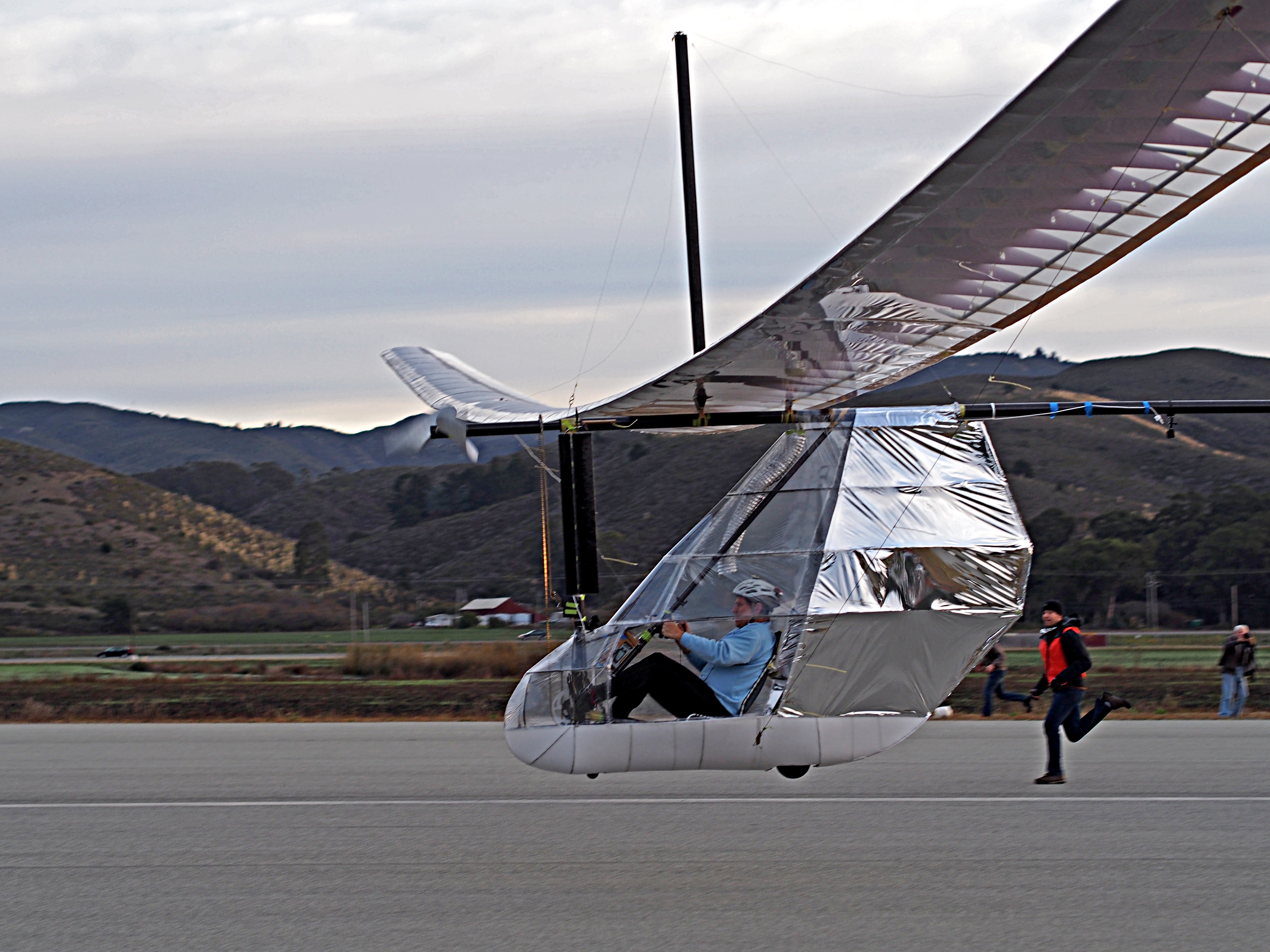
First flight, at Half Moon Bay Airport

The DaSH PA – dead simple human powered airplane – is a project led by Alec Proudfoot to build and fly a human-powered aircraft. The project's first flight on December 5, 2015, at Half Moon Bay Airport, was piloted by Proudfoot during which the aircraft flew 233 metres (764 feet).

Subsequent flight trials in February, June, and November 2016, have also been successful. The second November 5 flight, piloted by Craig Robinson, covered 1.62 kilometres (1.01 miles) and lasted four minutes.

The longest flight yet occurred on November 18, 2017, lasting 5 minutes and 20 seconds, covering 1.92 km.

== Project history ==
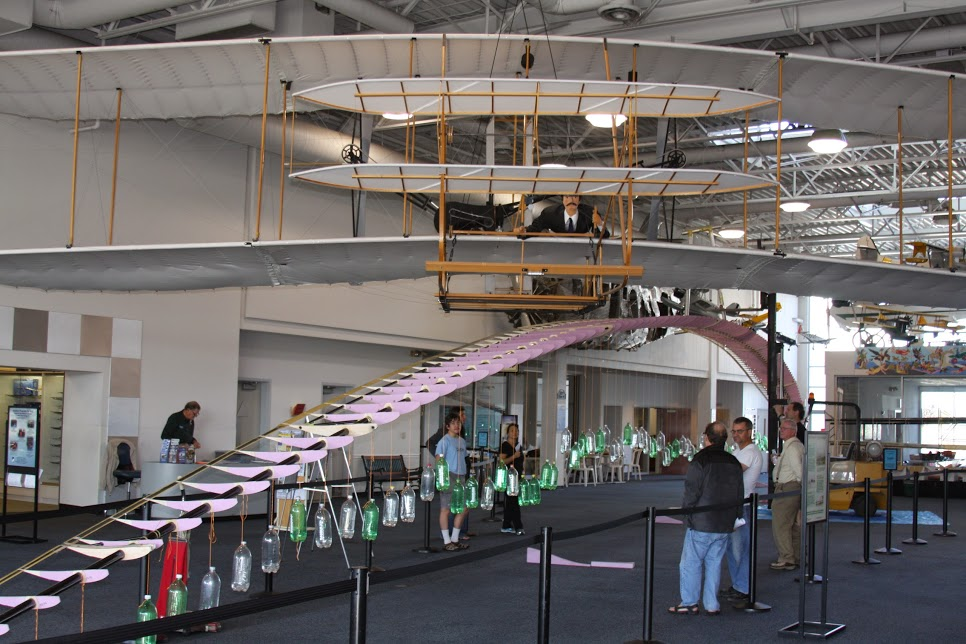
Load test of its v6-WE wing at Hiller Aviation Museum

Proudfoot started the DaSH PA project in late 2010 as a "for-fun, afterhours project to build a human powered airplane".

The original design goals were a weight of 36.3 kilograms (80.0 pounds), and wingspan of 33.3 metres (109.3 ft). It was designed to fly at 23 kilometres per hour (14 miles per hour). In October 2015, the team conducted wing load testing at the Hiller Aviation Museum in San Carlos, California.

Over its history, the DaSH PA team has included hundreds of volunteers, and as of November 2017, nine pilots.

== Flights ==
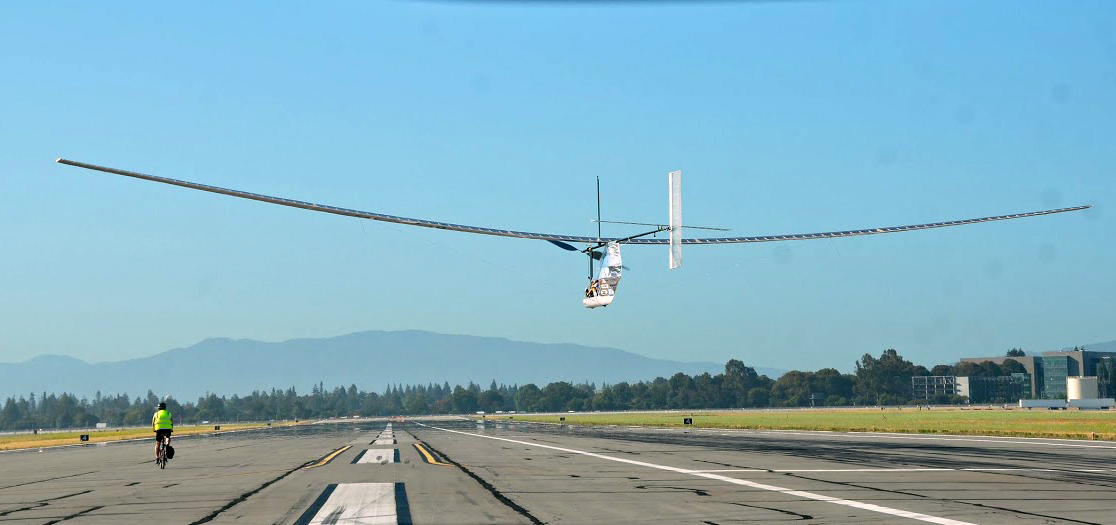
1.3 kilometres (0.8 mi) flight at Moffett Federal Airfield piloted by Craig Robinson

Proudfoot wrote, "We've now had eight pilots fly a total of 22 flights, and the airplane has traveled about 11,000 meters in about 27-1/2 minutes of total flight time."

On December 5, 2015, the first flight at Half Moon Bay Airport, piloted by Proudfoot, was successful, but ended after a tail bracket broke. The problem was subsequently repaired. The final craft weight was 45 kilograms (99 pounds).

On February 20 and 21, 2016, the team made six successful flights, with six different pilots, at Half Moon Bay Airport.

On June 25 and 26, 2016, the team made another five flights at Moffett Federal Field, close to their headquarters in Silicon Valley, California; on the last flight, the plane crash-landed after difficulty compensating for a crosswind, damaging the nose-wheel tube, fairing, and propeller.

On November 5, 2016, the team made eight flights with seven pilots at Moffett Field.

On December 11 and 17, 2016, the team conducted more flights at Moffett Field. On the last flight, piloted by Alec Proudfoot, torsional divergence resulted in wing collapse.

In October and November 2017, the team had a total of 17 additional flights at Moffett.

== See also ==
- List of human-powered aircraft
