= Derek Piggott =

English aviator

Derek Piggott MBE
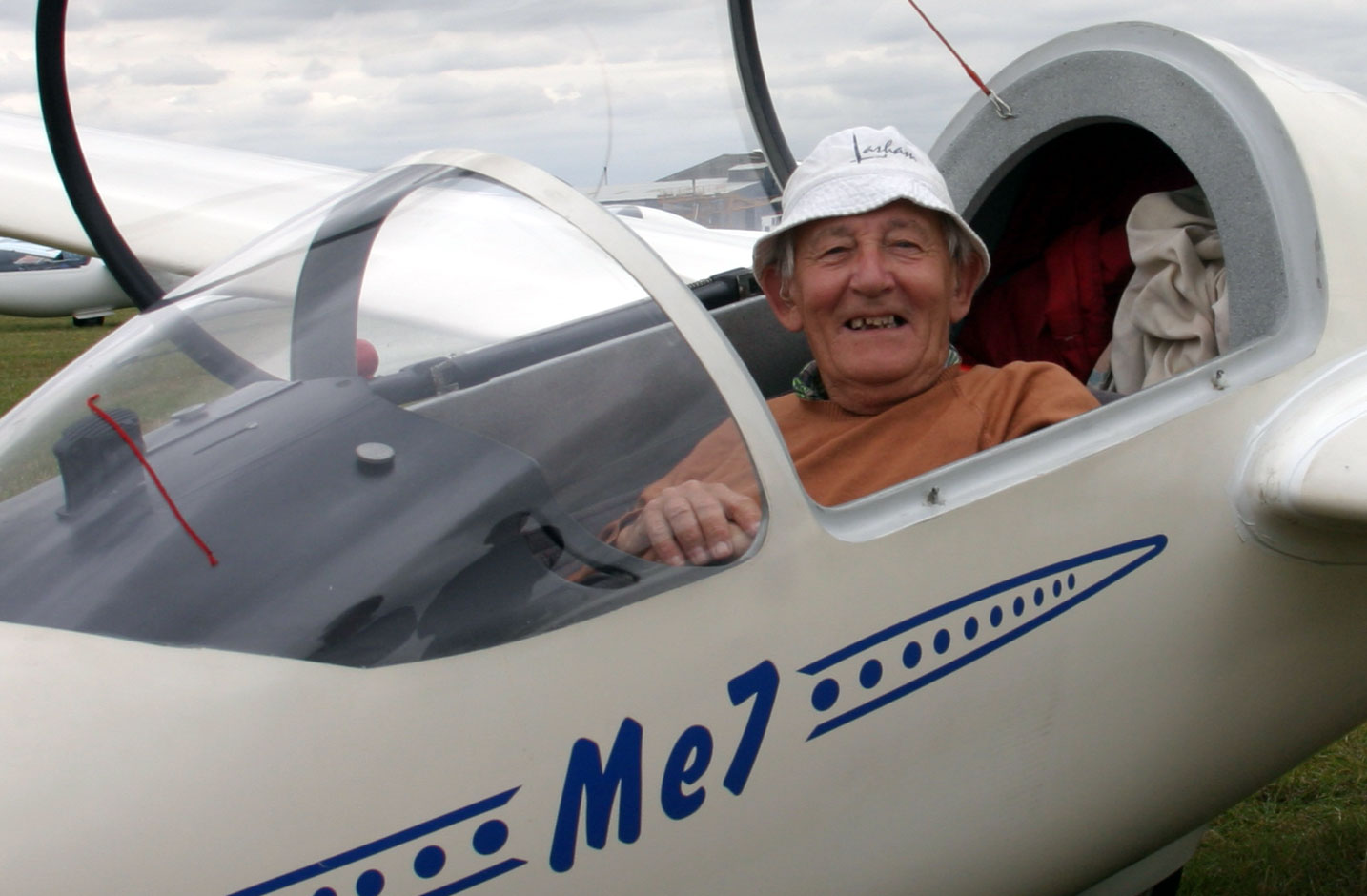
- Derek Piggott in his natural habitat at the Lasham Regional Competition in 2005
- Born: Alan Derek Piggott; 27 December 1922; Chadwell Heath, Essex, England
- Died: 6 January 2019 (aged 96)
- Citizenship: United Kingdom
- Occupations: Aviator, flying instructor and author

Alan Derek Piggott MBE (27 December 1922 – 6 January 2019) was one of Britain's best known glider pilots and instructors. He had over 5,000 hours on over 153 types of powered aircraft and over 5,000 hours on over 184 types of glider. He was honoured for his work on the instruction and safety of glider pilots. In 1961 he became the first person to make an officially authenticated take-off and flight in a man-powered aircraft. He also worked as a stunt pilot in several feature films.

== Early years ==
Piggott was born in Chadwell Heath, Essex, the son of Rev. William Piggott and Alice Harvey. His father was a conscientious objector in the First World War, led the rent strike against London County Council after the war, and was a frequent speaker at Hyde Park. When his mother died, the family moved to Sutton, Surrey, where Derek attended Sutton County School. When he left school he became a trainee scientific instrument maker. He had been a very active aero-modeller and helped to form the Sutton Model Aircraft Club. After the war he was selected to be a member of the British Wakefield Cup team, a prestigious aero modelling competition held that year in Akron, Ohio. He first flew in an Avro 504 as a passenger at the age of four.

== Royal Air Force ==
Piggott joined the Royal Air Force in 1942 as aircrew and made a first solo in a de Havilland DH.82A Tiger Moth after only six hours dual. He completed his training in Canada and was commissioned as a Pilot Officer in 1943. He was then sent on a multi-engine instructors' course and then on a course for elementary instructors before returning to England. By 1944, there was a surplus of trained pilots and he volunteered to fly military gliders. After a short conversion to the Airspeed Horsa, General Aircraft Hotspur, and Waco Hadrian, he was posted to India and then on to Burma where he flew Douglas Dakotas dropping supplies to front-line troops. During his stay in India, he instructed Royal Indian Air Force students and flew low anti-riot patrols just before the partition of India in August 1947.

Back in the UK, he was posted as a Staff Instructor at the Central Flying School at RAF Little Rissington where he trained instructors and flew North American Harvards, Boulton Paul Balliols, Avro Athenas, Gloster Meteors, Supermarine Spitfires, de Havilland Mosquitos, and Avro Lancasters. After being awarded an A1 Instructor Rating, he joined the Home Command Gliding Instructors' School at Detling teaching civilian instructors for the Air Training Corps on Slingsby T.21 and Slingsby Kirby Cadet gliders. As Chief Flying Instructor he introduced training methods that greatly improved safety. He also taught school teachers in the Combined Cadet Force how to teach flying in primary gliders. Flying with an ATC cadet as co-pilot in the national gliding championships, he established a British two-seater altitude record, in a T.21, climbing to over 17,000 feet (5,200 m) in a thunderstorm over Sheffield. In 1953, Piggott received the Queen's Commendation for Valuable Service in the Air for work on developing and introducing new instructional techniques for gliding in the ATC.

== Gliding career ==
In 1953, he left the RAF as a Flight Lieutenant and was the Chief Flying Instructor (CFI) for Lasham Gliding Society between 1953 and 1989, though he took breaks during this time to do stunt flying. He travelled widely, lecturing and advising gliding associations such as the Soaring Society of America and the Dutch gliding association on instructional techniques such as the use of motor gliders in training. As a leading authority on gliding, he wrote seven books on the subject, an autobiography, several monographs, and many magazine articles. His first book 'Gliding' was first published in 1958 and an eighth edition in 2002.

In addition he had success as a competition glider pilot winning three regional championships, was the UK National aerobatic glider champion in 1961, and set several national gliding records including the single-seat altitude record of over 25,000 feet (7,600 m) in an active thunderstorm in a Slingsby Skylark. He holds the FAI Diamond Badge. In 2003 at the age of 81, he completed a 505 km (314 mi) task in a Fedorov Me7 Mechta glider with only a 12.7 m (42 ft) span in a national competition in a time of 7hr 14min. (Several much younger pilots with superior machines failed to complete this task). He ceased regularly flying gliders solo in December 2012 but had one last Hurrah in an EoN Baby at Lyveden in August 2013, and ceased holding a Private Pilot Licence (PPL).

He was a member of a test group for the British Gliding Association (BGA) and tested a number of prototype gliders and foreign machines for approval to be imported. He made a successful emergency parachute descent from a damaged SZD-9 Bocian making him a member of the Caterpillar Club. He researched the effect of sub-gravity sensations as a cause for many serious and fatal gliding accidents.

== Other flying ==
On 9 November 1961, flying SUMPAC (Southampton University's Man Powered Aircraft), Derek Piggott became the first person to make an officially authenticated take-off and flight in a man-powered aircraft. The longest flight was 650 yd (590 m); turns were attempted, with 80 degrees the best achieved and he made a total of 40 flights in SUMPAC.

He took a break from being a gliding instructor to become a stunt pilot and was also technical adviser on several feature films. His role as a stunt pilot, began in 1965 with the film The Blue Max which tells the story of the competitive rivalry between two German pilots in the First World War. He was enlisted as one of several pilots who helped recreate the live dog-fight scenes for the film. However, he was the only stunt pilot to agree to fly for the climax of the film in which the two rivals challenge each other to fly beneath the spans of a bridge over a river. Taking the role of both German pilots and with multiple takes from contrasting camera angles, he ended up flying through the wide span of this bridge in Ireland 15 times and 17 times through the narrower span. The two Fokker Dr.I replicas had about 4 ft (1.2 m) of clearance on each side when passing through the narrower span. Piggott was able to fly through the arch reliably by aligning two scaffolding poles, one in the river and one on the far bank. The director had placed a flock of sheep next to the bridge so that they would scatter as the plane approached in order to demonstrate that the stunt was real and had not used models. However, by later takes, the sheep had become accustomed to the planes and continued to graze, and so they had to be scared by the shepherd.

In Darling Lilli, he was responsible for the majority of the designs of six replica aircraft and for supervising their construction in a period of nine weeks. Some of the dog fight scenes are considered to be among the best made. However, they had to be re-shot the following year because the film was changed from being comic to serious.

Another notable film role was Derek Piggott's contribution to Those Magnificent Men in Their Flying Machines in which he flew and advised on the construction of several of the early aircraft recreated for use in the film. Many of the planes employed wing warping for control in roll, which involved re-discovering how to fly them safely without the better roll control that comes from the use of ailerons. Several of the aircraft had dangerous features and he had a number of narrow escapes.

In Villa Rides he had to crash an aircraft that was flying towards a cliff by making the undercarriage collapse. This stopped it from 110 km/h (68 mph) in about 10 m (33 ft)

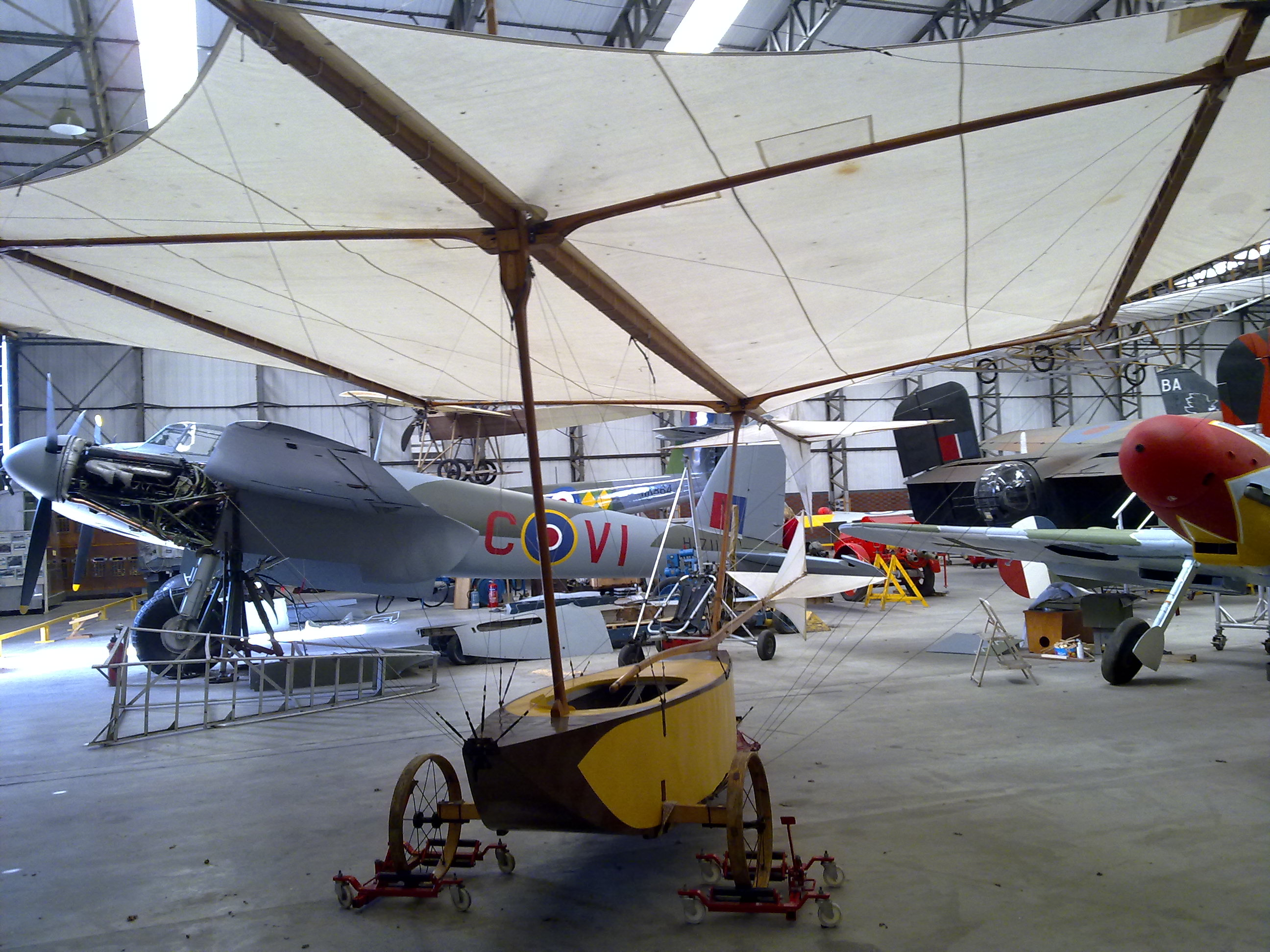
The replica of Cayley's glider flown by Derek Piggott

Derek Piggott flew some or all the aerial stunts in several other films: Von Richthofen and Brown (The Red Baron); Agatha; Slipstream; You Can't Win 'Em All; Chitty Chitty Bang Bang and for several television programmes. For one of these TV programmes a replica of the Sir George Cayley's first heavier-than-air flying machine was built in the early 1970s. The machine was flown by Derek Piggott at the original site in Brompton Dale in 1973 for a TV programme and again in 1985 for the IMAX film On the Wing.

== Piggott Hook ==
Derek Piggott was the inventor of the "Piggott-Hook", which is designed to prevent air brakes opening on a launch. The system is installed in all new gliders built by DG Flugzeugbau

== Death ==
Piggott died of a stroke, aged 96, on 6 January 2019.

== Honours ==
In 1987 Derek Piggott was appointed a Member of the Most Excellent Order of the British Empire (MBE). In 2007 he was awarded the Royal Aero Club Gold Medal—the highest award for aviation in the UK. Also in 2007 the Royal Aeronautical Society appointed Derek an Honorary Companion of the Society. In 2008 he was awarded the Lilienthal Gliding Medal by the Fédération Aéronautique Internationale for outstanding service over many years to the sport of gliding. In July 2016 he was appointed President of the BHPFC (British Human Powered Flying Club) in recognition of his pioneering achievements in the field of human powered aviation.

== Bibliography ==
- Piggott, Derek (1977). Delta Papa A Life of Flying. Pelham Books. ISBN 0-7207-0979-2.
- Piggott, Derek (1978). Going Solo: A Simple Guide To Soaring. A & C Black. ISBN 0-7136-1899-X.
- Piggott, Derek (2002). Gliding: A handbook on soaring flight. A & C Black. ISBN 0-7136-6148-8.
- Piggott, Derek (1998). Gliding Safety. A & C Black. ISBN 0-7136-4853-8.
- Piggott, Derek (1999). Understanding Flying Weather. A & C Black. ISBN 0-7136-4346-3.
- Piggott, Derek (2002). Understanding Gliding. A & C Black. ISBN 0-7136-6147-X.
- Piggott, Derek (2002). Beginning Gliding. A & C Black. ISBN 0-7136-4155-X.
- Piggott, Derek (1990). Derek Piggott on Gliding. A & C Black. ISBN 0-7136-5799-5.

His monographs are:

- 'Sub-gravity sensations and gliding accidents'
- 'Stop worrying about stalling and spinning'
- 'Using motor gliders for training glider pilots'
- 'Ground launches'
