= Musculair =

1980s German human-powered aircraft

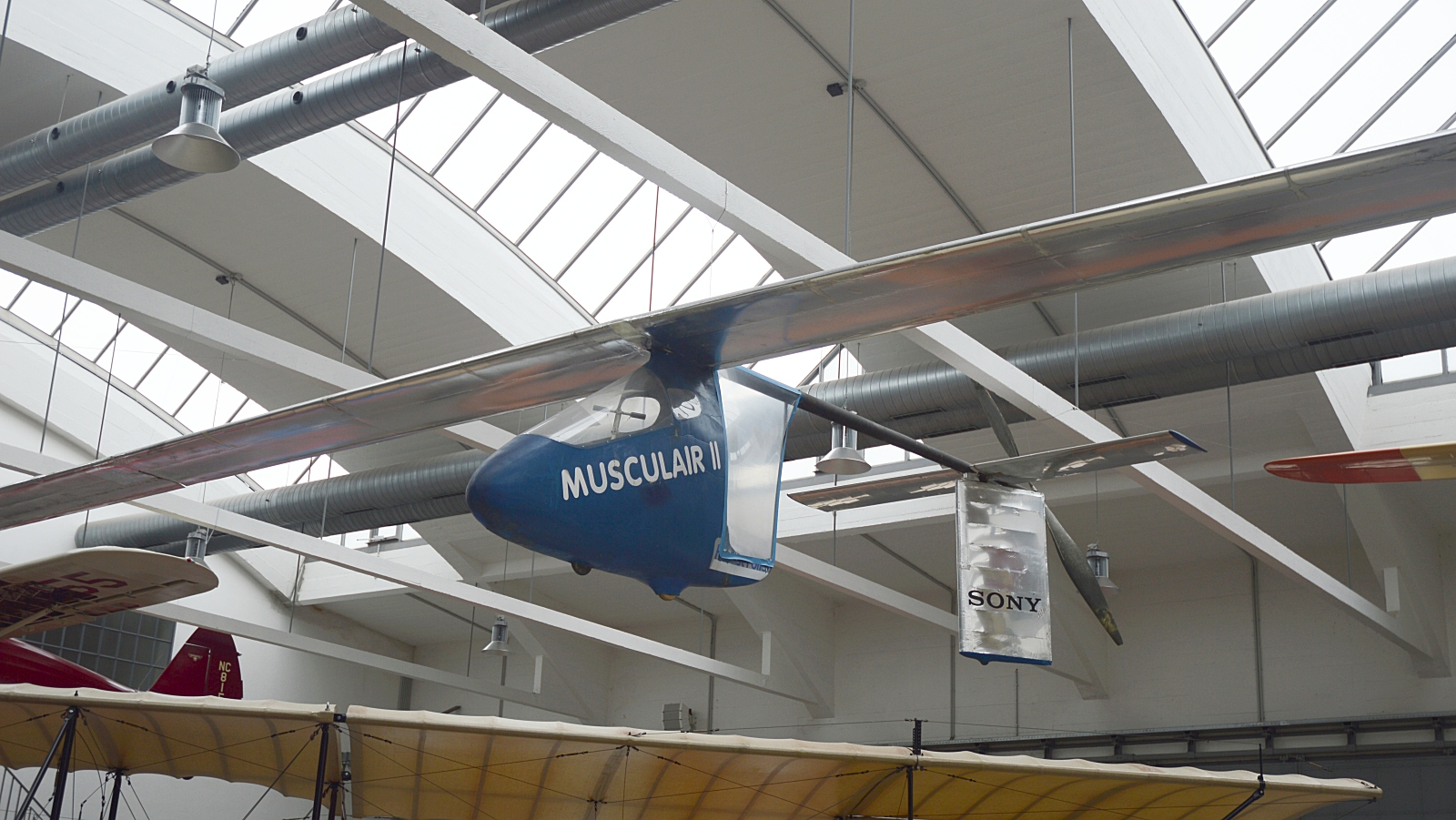
- Musculair II at the Deutsches Museum Flugwerft Schleissheim, Munich, Germany

General information
- Type: Human-powered aircraft
- Number built: 2

Musculair 1 and Musculair 2 are two human-powered aircraft designed and built by German academic and engineer Günther Rochelt.

== Musculair 1 ==
Rochelt designed Musculair 1 and completed building it in 1984. His son, Holger, won a Kremer prize in the same year for his flight over a 1,500 m (4,900 ft) triangular course, improving the record to 4 minutes and 25 seconds. In the same year, he set a world speed record at 35.7 km/h (22.2 mph), receiving a second Kremer prize. Later that year, Holger and his sister Katrin, at that time still a child, became the first passengers in a human-powered aircraft.

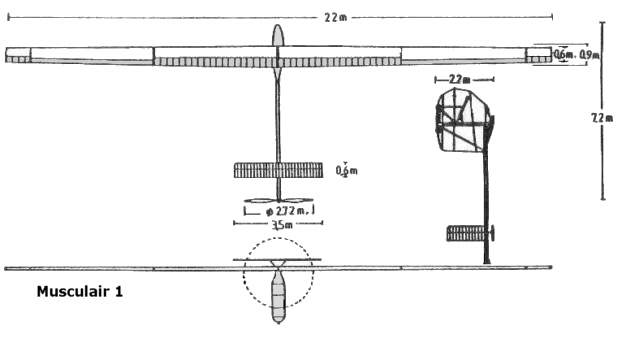
Drawing of Musculair 1, build by Gunther Rochelt in 1984

- Length: 7.20 m
- Wingspan: 22.00 m
- Wing area: 16.50 m^{2}
- Glide ratio: 1:38
- Height: 2.20 m
- Mass of the aircraft: 28 kg
- Propeller diameter: 2.72 m
- Required minimum power: 200 watts
- Required performance (11m / s): 280 watts

== Musculair 2 ==
Günther designed Musculair 2, and Holger slimmed down to just 41 kilograms (90 lb) to reduce the total mass of craft and human, leading to him setting a new Fédération Aéronautique Internationale world record for a human-powered aircraft at 44.32 kilometres per hour (27.54 mph) on 2 October 1985. The record, which still stands as of 2023, was set over a circuit at the Sonderlandeplatz Oberschleißheim airfield, near Munich.

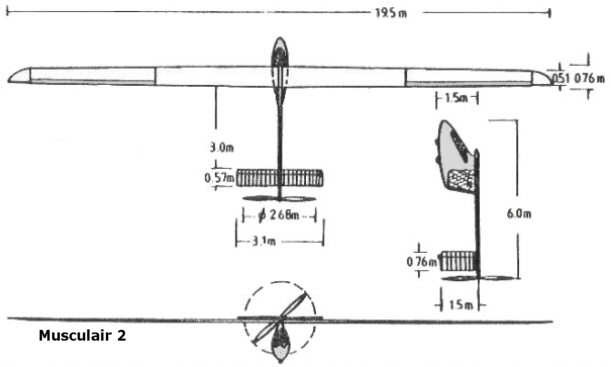
Drawing of Musculair 2, build by Gunther Rochelt in 1984/85. Drawing modified by Dr. Wessmann, 2006

- Length: 6.00 m
- Wingspan: 19.50 m
- Wing area: 11.70 m2
- Glide ratio: 1:37
- Height: 1.50 m
- Mass of the plane: 25 kg
- Propeller diameter: 2.68 m

== Aircraft on display ==
Today, Musculair I is on display at the main Deutsches Museum, Munich. Musculair 2 is on display at the specialist Deutsches Museum Flugwerft Schleissheim in Oberschleißheim.

== See also ==
- Solair
- List of human-powered aircraft
