= Malliga 1 =

1960s Austrian human-powered aircraft

General information
- Type: Human-powered aircraft
- National origin: Austrian
- Manufacturer: Horst Josef Malliga
- Number built: 1

History
- First flight: September, 1967
- Variant: Malliga 2

The Malliga 1 human powered aircraft was the project of Horst Josef Malliga. It is thought that it was the first successful Continental European human-powered aircraft.

Design work began in August 1966, with the first flight taking place in September 1967. The aircraft was a low-wing monoplane, with a pod and boom configuration. The pilot sat in a recumbent position, and powered a two bladed pusher propeller, located behind a streamlined nacelle. Twin booms supported twin fins, with an all-flying tailplane located between them. Constructed from aluminium tubing and polystyrene, with plastic film covering.

The Malliga 1 had a constant-chord wingplan, and spanned 20.00 m (65 ft 7in). As originally designed, the tailfins did not incorporate rudders, and directional control was made via two fins located outboard and underneath the wing. Lateral control was obtained by wingtip ailerons. With this configuration, and under human-power alone, flights of up to 150 m (487.50 ft) were made. Directional control proved inadequate, and the tailfin area was increased, with rudders being incorporated. Subsequent flights were tow-launched, up to 10 m (32.50 ft) altitude, achieving distances of up to 400 m (1,300 ft).

During 1971–72, the craft was modified, with this iteration being known as the Malliga 2.

== Specifications (Malliga 1) ==
Data from Luftfahrzeugbau in Österreich von den anfängen bis zur gegenwart

General characteristics

- Crew: 1
- Length: 16 ft 5 in (5.00 m)
- Wingspan: 65 ft 7 in (20.00 m)
- Height: 7 ft 1 in (2.15 m)
- Wing area: 250 sq ft (23 m^{2})
- Gross weight: 254 lb (115 kg)

Performance

- Cruise speed: 18–21 mph (29–33 km/h, 16–18 kn)

== See also ==
- SUMPAC
- HMPAC Puffin
- List of human-powered aircraft
