= HMPAC Puffin =

British man-powered aircraft

Puffin

General information
- Type: Human-Powered Aircraft
- National origin: United Kingdom
- Manufacturer: Hatfield Man Powered Aircraft Club (HMPAC)
- Designer: John Wimpenny
- Number built: 2

History
- First flight: 16 November 1961

The HMPAC Puffin was a British man-powered aircraft designed by a team headed by John Wimpenny, an aerodynamicist at the de Havilland Aircraft Company. It was built by the Hatfield Man Powered Aircraft Club (HMPAC) on the company's premises in Hatfield, Hertfordshire. On 2 May 1962, Wimpenny, aged 39, piloted the Puffin at the Hatfield Aerodrome, pedalling to power the propeller, achieving a flight distance of 995 yd (910 m), a world record which was to stand for ten years. The Puffin had a wingspan of 85 ft (26 m).

== Puffin II ==
An improved version of the Puffin was developed and built in 1965 as the HMPAC Puffin II. First flown on 27 August 1965, the Puffin II utilized the transmission components of the Puffin I in a completely new airframe.

After it had been damaged, the Puffin II airframe was given to Liverpool University, who used it to build the Liverpuffin.

== Specifications ==
Data from Jane's All The World's Aircraft 1962–63

General characteristics

- Crew: 1
- Length: 20 ft (6.1 m) (excluding nose boom)
- Wingspan: 84 ft (26 m)
- Height: 9 ft 4 in (2.84 m)
- Wing area: 330 sq ft (31 m^{2})
- Empty weight: 118 lb (54 kg)
- Powerplant: 1 × Human athlete
- Propellers: 2-bladed wooden, 9 ft (2.7 m) diameter

== See also ==
- Malliga 1
- SUMPAC
- List of human-powered aircraft
