= Kremer prize =

Monetary award given to pioneers of human-powered flight

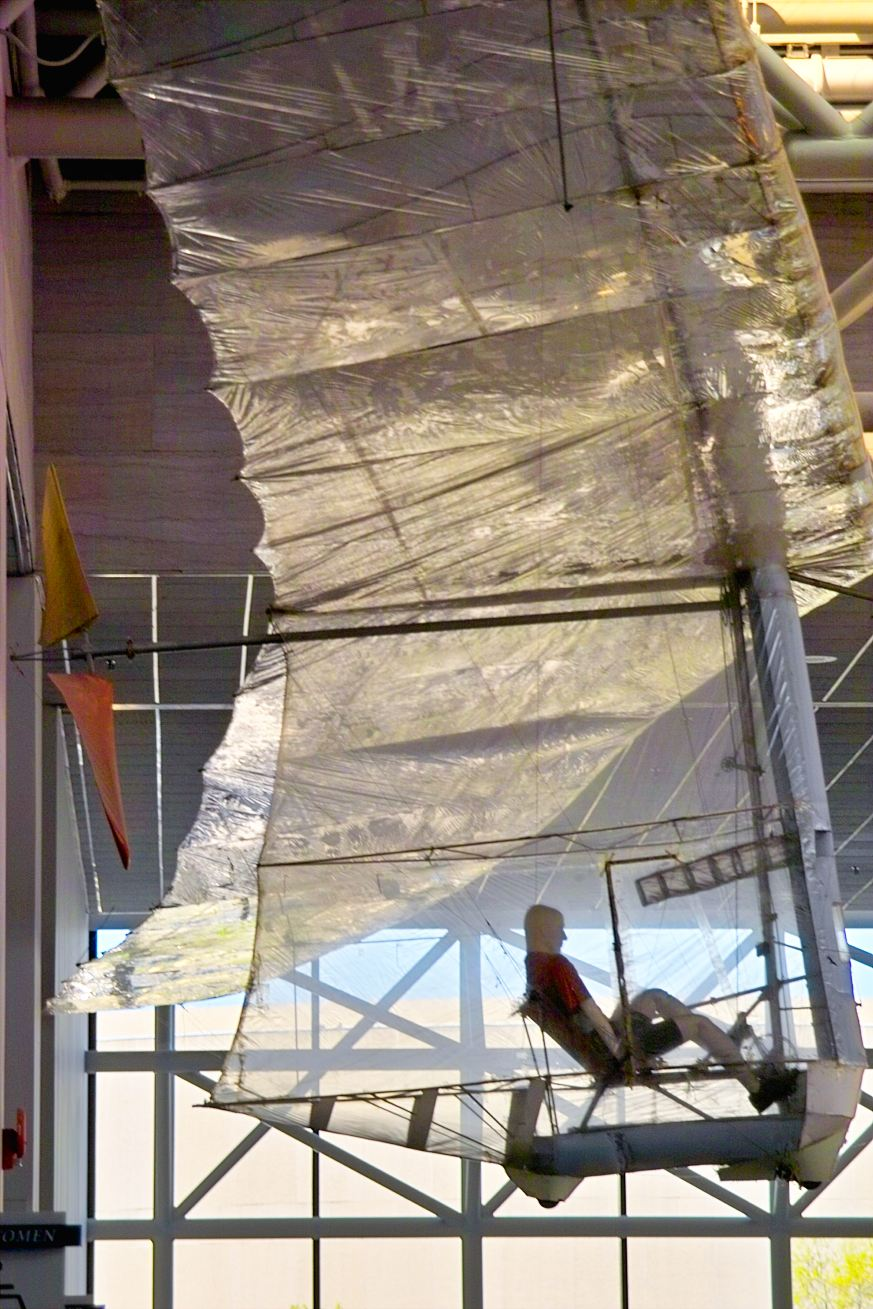
Gossamer Condor displayed in the Smithsonian museum, April 2006.

The Kremer prizes are a series of monetary awards, established in 1959 by the industrialist Henry Kremer.

== Royal Aeronautical Society Human Powered Flight Group ==
The Royal Aeronautical Society's "Man Powered Aircraft Group" was formed in 1959 by the members of the Man Powered Group of the College of Aeronautics at Cranfield when they were invited to join the Society. Its title was changed from "Man" to "Human" in 1988 because of the many successful flights made by female pilots.

Under the auspices of the Society, in 1959 the industrialist Henry Kremer offered the first Kremer prizes, of £5,000 for the first human-powered aircraft to fly a figure-of-eight course round two markers half-a-mile apart. It was conditional that the designer, entrant pilot, place of construction and flight must all be British. In 1973 Kremer increased the prize to £50,000 and opened it to all nationalities, to stimulate interest.

The first Kremer prize of £50,000 was won on 23 August 1977 by Dr. Paul MacCready when his Gossamer Condor, piloted by Bryan Allen, was the first human-powered aircraft to fly a figure eight around two markers one half mile apart, starting and ending the course at least 10 feet (3.0 m) above the ground.

The second Kremer prize, of £100,000, was won on 12 June 1979, again by Paul MacCready, when Bryan Allen flew MacCready's Gossamer Albatross from England to France.

A Kremer prize of £20,000 for speed was won in 1984 by a design team of the Massachusetts Institute of Technology for flying their MIT Monarch B craft on a triangular 1.5 km (0.93 mi) course in under three minutes (for an average speed of 32 km/h (20 mph)). Further segments of a total prize pot of £100,000 were to be awarded for every improvement in speed of at least 5%; the next segment was won in the MacCready Bionic Bat with a flight of 163.28 seconds on 18 July 1984, piloted by Parker MacCready. The third segment was won by Holger Rochelt flying Musculair 1 designed by Günther Rochelt. The fourth segment was won on 2 December 1984, with a flight of 143.08 seconds in the MacCready Bionic Bat piloted by Bryan Allen. The fifth and final segment was won with a flight of 122.01 seconds by Holger Rochelt flying Musculair 2, after which the prize competition was withdrawn by the Royal Aeronautical Society on grounds of safety.

There are currently three Kremer Prizes that have not yet been awarded, for a total of £150,000:

- 26 mile Marathon course in under an hour (£50,000),
- Sporting aircraft challenge stressing maneuverability (£100,000),
- Local challenge that is limited to youth groups (under 18 years) in the UK.

== See also ==
- List of engineering awards
- Sikorsky Prize
