= MacCready Gossamer Condor =

American human-powered aircraft

Gossamer Condor
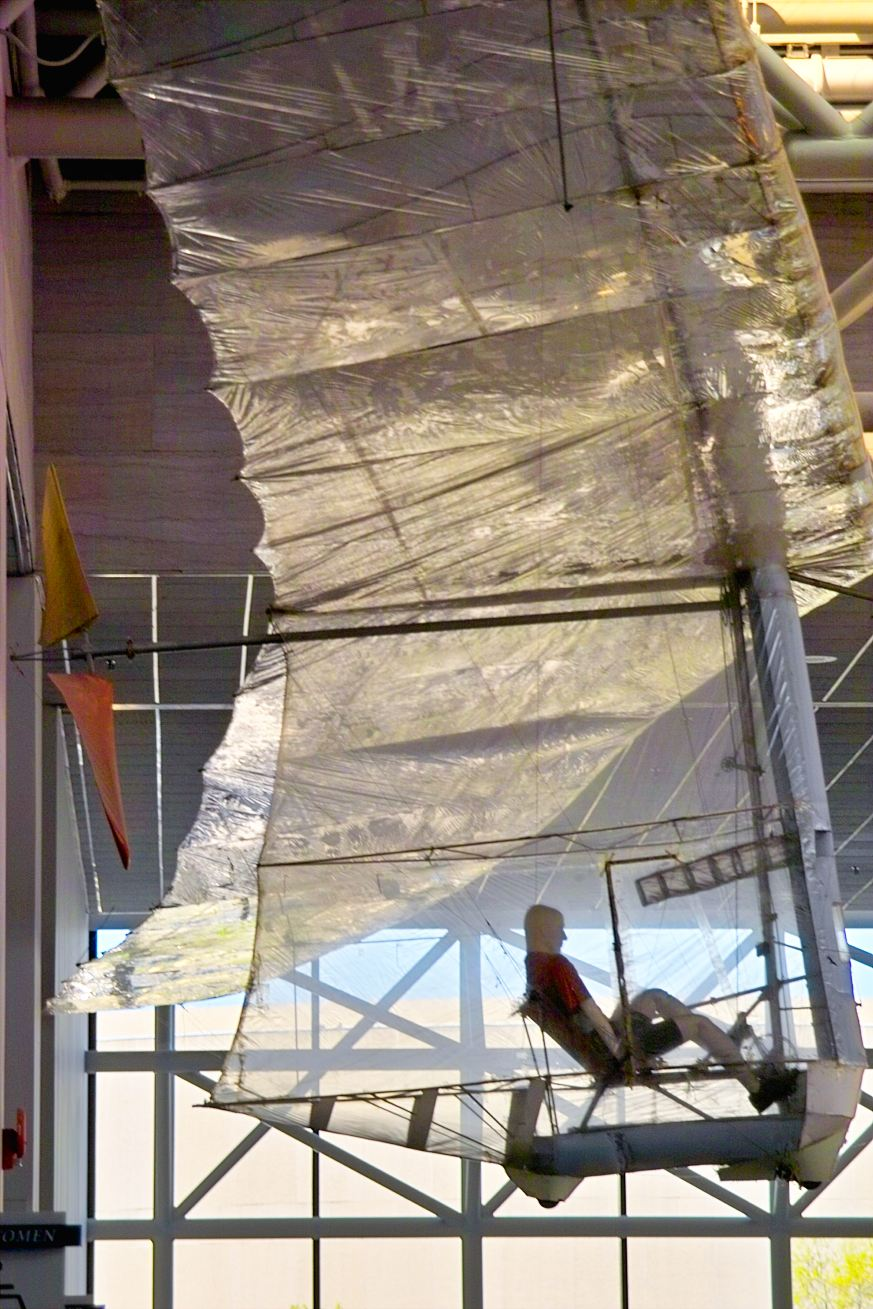

General information
- Type: experimental aircraft
- National origin: United States
- Manufacturer: AeroVironment
- Status: On display
- Number built: 1

History
- First flight: 1976
- Developed into: Gossamer Albatross

The MacCready Gossamer Condor was the first human-powered aircraft capable of controlled and sustained flight; as such, it won the Kremer prize in 1977. Its design was led by Paul MacCready of AeroVironment, Inc.

== Design and development ==
The Kremer Prize had been set up in 1959 by Henry Kremer, a British industrialist, and offered £50,000 in prize money to the first group that could fly a human-powered aircraft over a figure-eight course covering a total of one mile (1.6 kilometers). The course also included a ten-foot pole that the aircraft had to fly over at the start and at the end. Early attempts to build human-powered aircraft had focused on wooden designs, which proved too heavy. Very early attempts – notably the HV-1 Mufli and Pedaliante – used catapult launches.

In 1961, Southampton University's Man Powered Aircraft SUMPAC took to the air at Lasham Airfield on 9 November, piloted by Derek Piggott, achieving a maximum flight of 650 metres (2,130 ft). One week later, on 16 November, the Hatfield Puffin flew, and eventually managed a maximum flight of 908 metres (2,979 ft) but it was difficult to turn. The Jupiter managed 1,239 metres (4,065 ft) in June 1972. The Nihon Stork B achieved over two kilometres (1.2 mi) in 1976.

In the early 1970s, Paul MacCready and Peter B. S. Lissaman, both of AeroVironment Inc., took a fresh look at the challenge and came up with an unorthodox aircraft, the Gossamer Condor. He took his inspiration from hang gliders, increasing wing area so that the drag of the wire bracing needed would be reduced. The Gossamer Condor is built around a large wing with a gondola for the pilot underneath and a canard control surface on a fuselage extension in front, and is mostly built of lightweight plastics with aluminum spars.

== Operational history ==
The Gossamer Condor evolved over a period of time through three distinct versions. The first version, known by MacCready as the Pasadena version, was a proof-of-concept aircraft which flew only once, in the parking lot of the Rose Bowl in Pasadena. The first aircraft carrying the name Gossamer Condor was known as the Mojave version, without pilot fairings and other niceties, flown at Mojave airport by MacCready's sons on 26 December 1976. The record-breaking version, known as the Shafter version, included improvements such as a pilot nacelle and double-skin airfoil sections, allowing the aircraft to fly long distances as well as maneuver.

The aircraft, piloted by amateur cyclist and hang-glider pilot Bryan Allen, won the first Kremer prize on August 23, 1977, by completing a figure-eight course specified by the Royal Aeronautical Society, at Minter Field in Shafter, California. It was capable of taking off under human power.

On September 22, 1977, Maude Oldershaw, wife of the chief construction engineer Vern Oldershaw, became the first female to pilot a human-powered airplane under her own power.

The aircraft is preserved at the Smithsonian National Air and Space Museum.

The success led Paul MacCready and AeroVironment to carry on with experimental aircraft: the Gossamer Albatross, which crossed the English Channel; the Solar Challenger, a solar electric-powered version that also made an English Channel crossing; and NASA's Pathfinder/Helios series of unmanned solar-powered aircraft.

== Specifications (Gossamer Condor) ==

General characteristics

- Crew: one (pilot-engine)
- Length: 30 ft 0 in (9.14 m)
- Wingspan: 96 ft 0 in (29.25 m)
- Height: 18 ft 0 in (5.49 m)
- Empty weight: 70 lb (31.75 kg)
- Powerplant: 1 × Human

== See also ==
- The Flight of the Gossamer Condor, a 1979 short documentary film

Related development

- MacCready Gossamer Albatross

Aircraft of comparable role, configuration, and era

- SUMPAC

Related lists

- List of human-powered aircraft
- List of slowest fixed-wing aircraft
