= MacCready Gossamer Albatross =

Human-powered aircraft developed by American aeronautics company AeroVironment

Gossamer Albatross
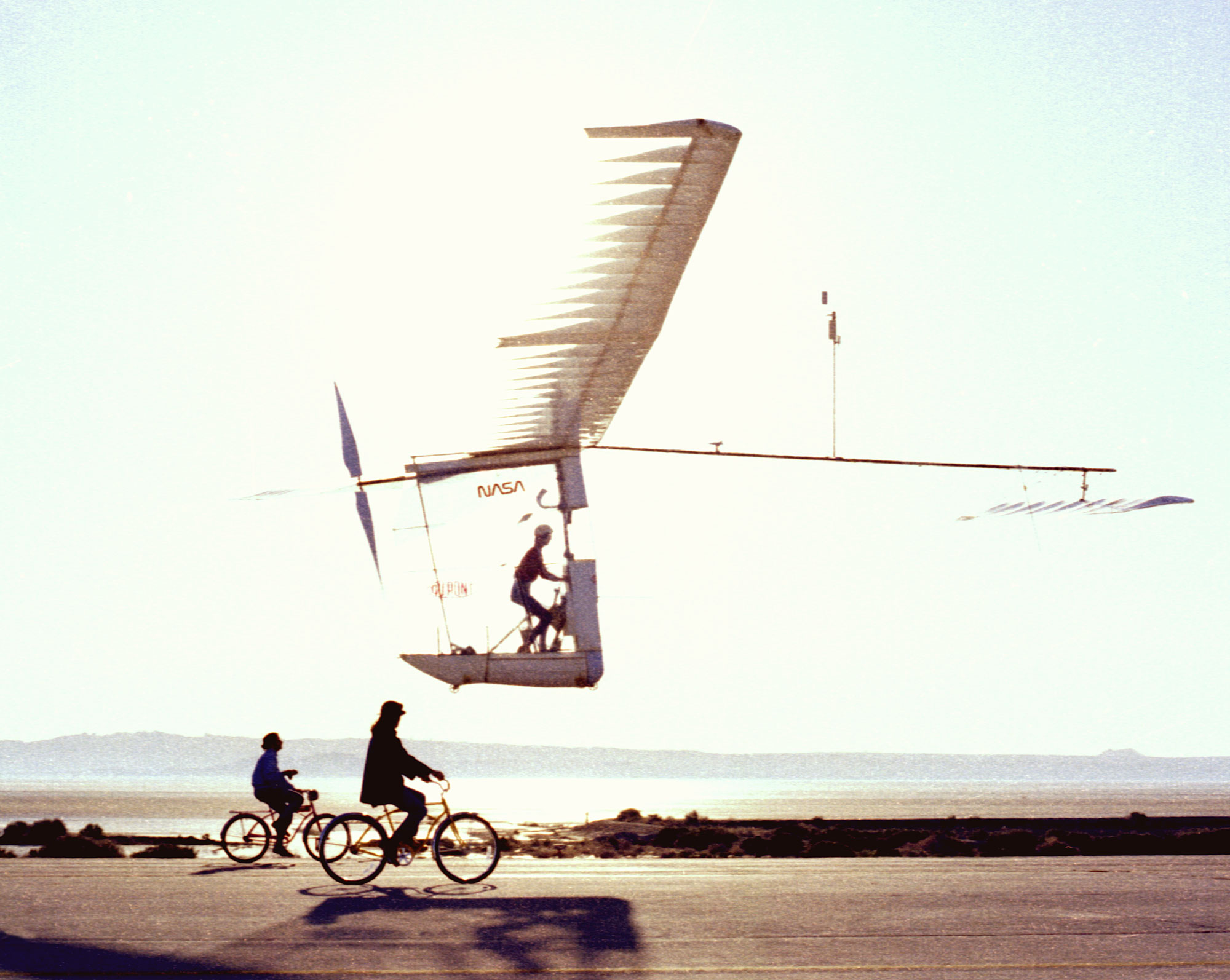
- The Gossamer Albatross II at Dryden Flight Research Center in 1980

General information
- Type: experimental aircraft
- National origin: United States
- Manufacturer: AeroVironment
- Designer: Paul MacCready
- Status: Gossamer Albatross I - Steven F. Udvar-Hazy Center, Virginia, USA; Gossamer Albatross II - Museum of Flight in Seattle, Washington, USA
- Number built: 2

History
- First flight: 1979
- Developed from: Gossamer Condor
- Developed into: Gossamer Penguin

The Gossamer Albatross is a human-powered aircraft built by American aeronautical engineer Paul B. MacCready's company AeroVironment. On June 12, 1979, it completed a successful crossing of the English Channel to win the second Kremer prize worth £100,000 (equivalent to £639,000 in 2023).

== Design and development ==
The aircraft was designed and built by a team led by Paul B. MacCready, a noted American aeronautics engineer, designer, and world soaring champion. Gossamer Albatross was his second human-powered aircraft, the first being the Gossamer Condor, which had won the first Kremer prize on August 23, 1977, by completing a 1-mile (1.6 km)-long figure-eight course. The second Kremer challenge was then announced as a flight across the English Channel recalling Louis Blériot's crossing of 1909.

The aircraft is of "canard" configuration, using a large horizontal stabilizer forward of the wing in a manner similar to the Wright brothers' successful Wright Flyer aircraft and powered using pedals to drive a large, two-bladed propeller. The Gossamer Albatross was constructed using a carbon fiber frame, with the ribs of the wings made with expanded polystyrene; the entire structure was then wrapped in a thin, transparent plastic (mylar PET film). The empty mass of the structure was only 71 lb (32 kg), although the gross mass for the Channel flight was almost 220 lb (100 kg). To maintain the craft in the air, it was designed with very long, tapering wings (high aspect ratio), like those of a glider, allowing the flight to be undertaken with a minimum of power. In still air, the required power was on the order of 300 W (0.40 hp), though even mild turbulence made this figure rise rapidly.

== The crossing ==
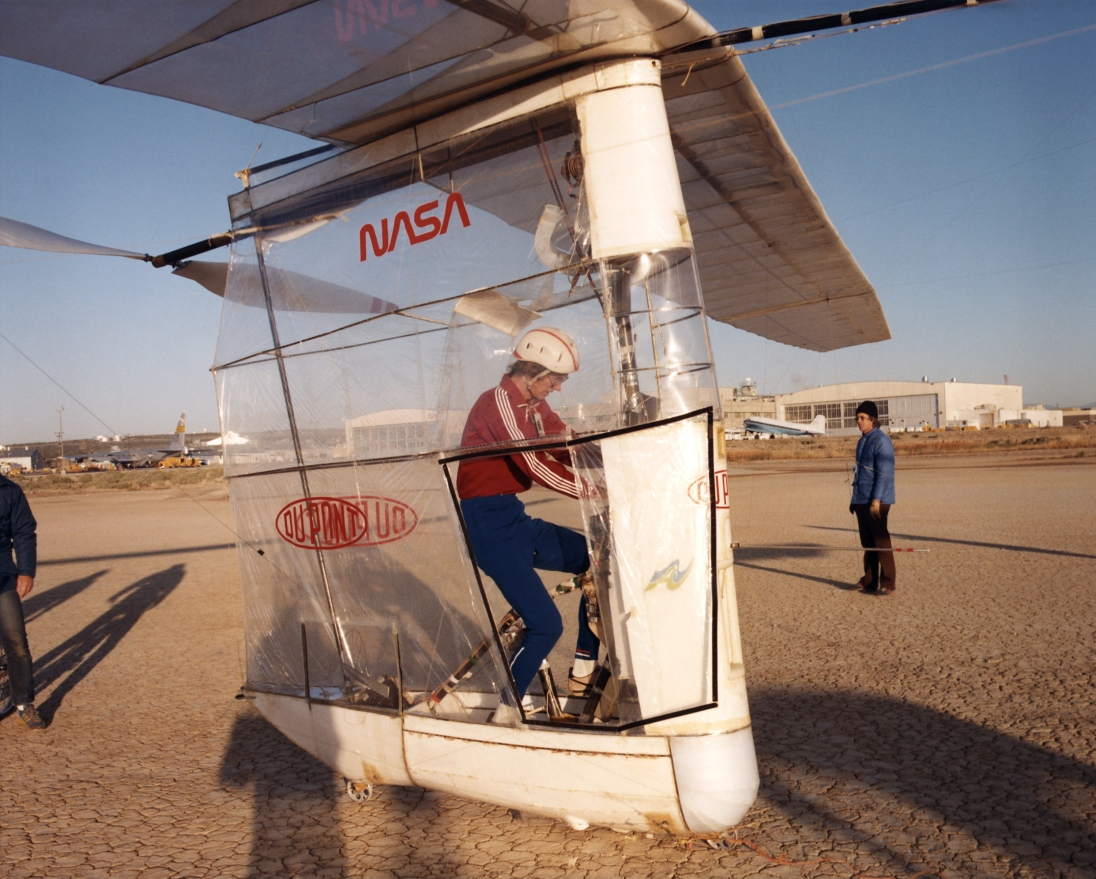
The cabin of the Gossamer Albatross, Armstrong Flight Research Center, April 1979

Just before 6 am on June 12, 1979, amateur cyclist and pilot Bryan Allen powered the Albatross to the rehearsed speed of 75 revolutions per minute and took off from a point near Folkestone, England. The Channel conditions and lack of wind were ideal for the crossing.

However, problems soon began to affect the aircraft and pilot. Allen's radio failed for a while and he was only able to communicate with the accompanying boats by hand and head movements. In addition, Allen's water supply had been estimated for a two-hour flight, but headwinds delayed the crossing and his supply ran out. Without adequate water, Allen suffered from dehydration and leg cramps.

With increasing headwinds, concern grew that the flight would have to be called off. With the coast of France still unseen, an accompanying boat maneuvered in front of the Albatross to hook it to safety. However, for the hooking procedure, Allen had gone a little higher and found less air turbulence, so he continued to pedal the aircraft and see if progress could be made. With a calming surface wind, Allen continued, and landed on a beach at Cap Gris-Nez in France. Allen completed the 22.2-mile (35.7 km) crossing in 2 hours and 49 minutes, achieving a top speed of 18 mph (29 km/h) and an average altitude of 5 ft (1.5 m).

== Versions ==
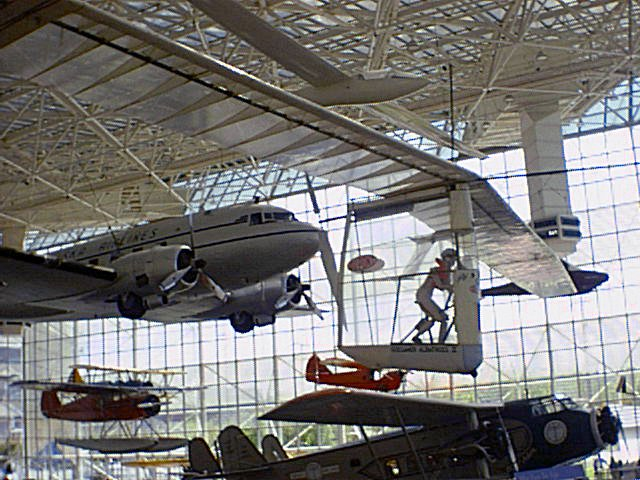
The Gossamer Albatross II at the Museum of Flight in Seattle

MacCready's team built two Albatrosses; the back-up plane was jointly tested as part of the NASA Langley/Dryden flight research program in 1980 and was also flown inside the Houston Astrodome, the first ever controlled indoor flight by a human-powered aircraft. The Gossamer Albatross II is currently on display at the Museum of Flight in Seattle, Washington.

Alistair Cooke devoted some of his Letter From America broadcast of 15/17 Jun 1979 to Allen's achievement.

== Prizes ==
For his work on the Gossamer Albatross, MacCready was later awarded the Collier Trophy.

== Specifications ==

Data from MuseumofFlight.org

General characteristics

- Crew: One (pilot-engine)
- Capacity: 145-pound (66 kg) useful load
- Length: 34 ft 0 in (10.36 m)
- Wingspan: 97 ft 8 in (29.77 m)
- Height: 16 ft 0 in (4.88 m)
- Wing area: 488 sq ft (45.3 m^{2})
- Aspect ratio: 19.5
- Empty weight: 70 lb (32 kg)
- Gross weight: 215 lb (98 kg)
- Powerplant: 1 × Human

Performance

- Maximum speed: 18 mph (29 km/h, 16 kn)
- Range: 35 mi (56 km, 30 nmi)
- Wing loading: 0.44 lb/sq ft (2.1 kg/m^{2})

== See also ==
Related development

- MacCready Gossamer Condor

Aircraft of comparable role, configuration, and era

- Musculair
- SUMPAC

== Citations ==
=== Further reading ===
- Allen, Bryan. "Winged Victory of Gossamer Albatross". National Geographic, November 1979, vol. 156, n. 5, p. 640-651
- Morton Grosser. Gossamer Odyssey: The Triumph of Human-Powered Flight. MBI Press, 2004; Dover Publications, Inc., 1991; Houghton Mifflin Co., 1981
- Morton Grosser. On Gossamer Wings. York Custom Graphics, 1982
- Ciotti, Paul. More With Less - Paul MacCready and the dream of efficient flight. Encounter Books, 2002. ISBN 1-893554-50-3
