= Wright (disambiguation) =

Wright an occupational surname originating in England, meaning worker or shaper of wood.

Wright or Wrights may also refer to:

== Places ==
=== Australia ===
- Wright, Australian Capital Territory
- Division of Wright, federal electoral division in Queensland
- Electoral district of Wright, state electoral district in South Australia
- Wright railway station, Melbourne
- Wright Rock, Tasmanian island in northern Bass Strait

=== Canada ===
- Wright, Quebec, a former municipality, now part of Gracefield
- Mont Wright (Quebec), mountain near Fermont, Quebec

=== United States ===
- Wright, Florida
- Wright, Iowa
- Wright, Kansas
- Wright, Minnesota
- Wright, New York
- Wright, West Virginia
- Wright, Wyoming
- Wright City, Missouri
- Wright City, Oklahoma
- Wright County (disambiguation), several counties
- Wright Township (disambiguation), several townships

=== Solar System ===
- 1747 Wright, an asteroid
- Wright (lunar crater)
- Wright (Martian crater)
- Wright Mons, a mountain on Pluto

== Art, entertainment, and media ==
- Pastor Leon Wright, a fictional character in The Returned (U.S. TV series)
- Phoenix Wright: Ace Attorney, a game with the name of the titular character for the Game Boy Advance

== Brands, enterprises and organizations ==
- Wright Aeronautical, an American aircraft and aircraft engine manufacturer
- Wright Brand Foods, an American meat-packing company
- Wright Company, the Wright brothers' initial aviation business
- Wright Electric, an American company developing an electric airliner
- Wright State University, located in Dayton, Ohio
- Wilbur Wright College, a community college in Chicago
- Wright's Coal Tar Soap, a popular brand of antiseptic soap
- Wrightbus, an Irish bus (body) manufacturer
- Wrights (textile manufacturers)

== Other uses ==
- Wright (ADL), a software architecture description language developed by Carnegie Mellon University
- Wright Falcon, a 1970s British glider
- Wright Micron, a 1970s British human-powered aircraft
- Wright MPA Mk 1, a 1970s British human-powered aircraft
- Homer Wright rosettes, a clinical sign of certain types of cancer
- USS Wright, the name of two ships of the United States Navy
- Millwright, an industrial mechanic

== See also ==
- The Wrights (disambiguation)
- Justice Wright (disambiguation)
- Wright Field (disambiguation)
- Wright brothers (disambiguation)
- Right (disambiguation)
- Rite (disambiguation)
- Wight (disambiguation)
- Write (disambiguation)
- Wrought (disambiguation)
