= Perkins Reluctant Phoenix =

1960s British human-powered aircraft

- Rear quarter view of the Perkins Reluctant Phoenix

General information
- Type: Human-powered aircraft
- National origin: United Kingdom
- Manufacturer: Daniel Perkins
- Number built: 1

History
- First flight: 18 July 1966

The Reluctant Phoenix is a British human-powered aircraft, designed and built in the 1960s by the British engineer Daniel Perkins. It was notable for being an inflatable delta-wing tailless design, and for being flown indoors.

== Background ==
Perkins was employed with the Ministry of Defense during the 1950s and 1960s and developed a number of inflatable structures; both for his employers and on his own account. In the late 1950s, he built three human-powered aircraft, all with inflatable wings, though none were successful.

The Reluctant Phoenix was Perkins' fourth design. It was a tailless delta-wing monoplane, with a pusher propeller fitted to the tailing edge of the rudder. The primary structure of the craft consisted of single aluminium tube running along the centre-line of the aircraft. To this were attached the undercarriage's steerable nosewheel, pedal cranks, the pilot seat, the control system, a tailwheel, and the tail fin. The remainder of the aircraft's structure consisted of the inflatable wing, which was made from polyurethane-coated nylon fabric. The aerofoil was symmetrical with a 20% chord thickness, with the wing being made up of 8 spanwise webs to form the profile. The pilot sat in a recumbent position, fully ensconced within the wing, with only his head being exposed above an opening in the upper surface of the wing. The drive mechanism consisted of a set of bicycle pedals driving a rope belt drive, over pulleys, through to the propeller drive shaft. A set of handlebars, located underneath the pilot's knees, could be moved in three dimensions. A set of elevons built into the trailing edge of the wing allowed for horizontal and lateral control. The all-flying rudder would be used for directional control. Photographs of the craft show that a pair of vertical wing-tip fins were later added to the craft. It was reported that construction time involved 200 hours, and cost £200.

Due to no outdoor runaway being available, flight testing took place within the 812 ft (247 m)-long airship hangar at Cardington, Bedfordshire.

Its first flight took place on 18 July 1966. In all 97 flights were made, all with cyclist Mike Street as the pilot. Most of the flights involved towed launches, but at least four were achieved under human-power alone. Take-off runs were in the order of 140 yd (130 m). Flights attained an altitude of 2 ft (0.61 m), with the longest distance covered being 421 ft (128 m).

After flight testing was completed, the aircraft was placed in storage. After Perkins' death, the craft was transferred to Fred To, who went on to develop a larger inflatable tailless human-powered aircraft called the Phoenix.

== Specifications ==
Data from The history of man-powered flight

General characteristics

- Crew: 1
- Wingspan: 8.23 m (27 ft 0 in)
- Wing area: 23.40 m^{2} (251.9 sq ft)
- Aspect ratio: 4
- Empty weight: 17.30 kg (38 lb)
- Propellers: 2-bladed fixed-pitch, 2.58 m (8 ft 6 in) diameter 240 rpm

Performance

- Cruise speed: 29 km/h (18 mph, 16 kn)
- Stall speed: 24 km/h (15 mph, 13 kn)

== See also ==
Aircraft of comparable role, configuration, and era

- HMPAC Puffin
- Malliga 1
- Paxton man-powered aircraft
- Weybridge Mercury
- Wright Micron
- Wright MPA Mk 1

Related lists

- List of Human-powered aircraft
