= To Phoenix =

1980s British human-powered aircraft

- The To Phoenix in flight, 28 March 1982

General information
- Type: Human-powered aircraft
- National origin: United Kingdom
- Manufacturer: Fred To
- Number built: 1

History
- First flight: 1981

The Phoenix was a human-powered aircraft, designed and built in the 1980s by the British architect Frederick To. It was notable for being an inflatable tailless design and for its low airspeed.

Taking inspiration from Daniel Perkins' work with the Reluctant Phoenix, Fred To wished to resolve issues with storage and crashibility that previous human-powered aircraft had suffered from. To this end, the Phoenix was designed to have a simple layout, be easily stored, and be robust enough to survive accidents without damage.

== Design and development ==
The Phoenix was a flying-wing configuration, with a rectangular wing planform. A reflex aerofoil, based on a Wortmann 15% aerofoil, but increased to 20% thickness was used. An aspect ratio of 6 was selected as that was considered to be the practical limit for pitch stability for such a design. The wing was built up using polyester film, and was constructed using a series of conjoined tubes running the full span of the wing. The wing was also skinned using polyester film, with a series of curved riblets applied at intervals across the span helping to maintain the desired aerofoil cross-section. When fully deflated, the wing could be folded down and stowed onto a car's roofrack.

Downturned winglets at each wingtip provided directional control. The fuselage was constructed from carbon-fibre tubing, with the pilot seated in an upright cycling position and powering the tractor propeller via a chain drive. Control was by elevons and rudders in the winglets. These were operated by RC servoes controlled by the pilot.

== Flight tests ==
Initial flight tests were conducted in August 1981 at sportgrounds in Chiswick, West London, when a series of three towed flights took place. During the last of these flights, the aircraft crashed from a height of 25 ft (7.6 m), without any damaged being incurred. The first human-powered flight took place on 28 March 1982, at the London Docklands, with Ian Parker acting as pilot. Further flights were made that day, all of about 20 seconds duration. It was noted that the Phoenix took a long time to reach flight speed, which To determined was due to the air mass contained within the inflatable wing being some 200 lb (91 kg).

Contemporary articles mentioned that To was designing a smaller, hybrid-powered inflatable HPA, with it weighing 60 lb (27 kg) spanning 50 ft (15 m) and flying at 15 mph (24 km/h).

== Specifications ==
Side view of the Phoenix

Data from Jane's All the World's Aircraft 1982-83

General characteristics

- Crew: 1
- Length: 5.49 m (18 ft 0 in)
- Wingspan: 31.09 m (102 ft 0 in)
- Height: 4.22 m (13 ft 10 in)
- Wing area: 154.9 m^{2} (1,667 sq ft)
- Aspect ratio: 6
- Airfoil: Wortmann reflex
- Empty weight: 50 kg (110 lb)
- Gross weight: 109 kg (240 lb)
- Powerplant: 1 × cyclist pilot , 0.373 kW (0.500 hp)
- Propellers: 2-bladed fixed-pitch, 5.49 m (18 ft 0 in) diameter turning @ 45 rpm

Performance

- Cruise speed: 13 km/h (8.1 mph, 7.0 kn)

== See also ==
Aircraft of comparable role, configuration, and era

- HMPAC Puffin
- Malliga 1
- Paxton man-powered aircraft
- Perkins Reluctant Phoenix
- Weybridge Mercury
- Wright Micron
- Wright MPA Mk 1

Related lists

- List of Human-powered aircraft
