= Wright Field (disambiguation) =

Wilbur Wright Field is a WWI airfield near Dayton, Ohio.

Wright Field or variation, may also refer to:

== Places ==
- Wright-Patterson Air Force Base (formerly Wright Field), Ohio, US
- Belwood (Wright Field) Aerodrome, an airstrip in Belwood, Ontario, Canada
- Wright Brothers National Memorial, the field where the Wrights first flew in Kill Devil Hills, North Carolina, US
- Wright Brothers Field, Jezero Crater, Mars; the place where the Ingenuity Mars helicopter drone first flew
- Wright's Field in Alpine, Alpine, California, US; a nature reserve
- Wright Field, a baseball park in North Pole, Alaska, US, home field for the North Pole Nicks

== Other uses ==
- Wright Field (writer), American writer

== See also ==
- Alumni Field (Wright State) (Wright State University Alumbi Field), a soccer pitch in Dayton, Ohio, USA
- Fielding L. Wright (1895–1956), U.S. politician
- Wright (disambiguation)
- Field (disambiguation)
