= Halton Jupiter =

1970s British human-powered aircraft

General information
- Type: Human-powered aircraft
- National origin: United Kingdom
- Designer: Chris Roper
- Status: In storage
- Number built: 1

History
- First flight: 9 February 1972

The Halton Jupiter was a human-powered aircraft which established distance and duration records in the early 1970s.

== Background ==
The aircraft was originally designed in 1963 by Chris Roper of Woodford, Essex. Construction by Roper, and others, continued through to 1968, when ill-health halted work. In 1969, a workshop fire partially destroyed the craft. In 1970, the remains were handed over to Flight Lieutenant John Potter, based at RAF Halton, Buckinghamshire.

== Development and description ==
The aircraft was rebuilt at Halton, by an informal group of RAF staff and apprentices, led by Potter. Some 100 individuals were involved with the construction, contributing 4,000 hours towards it. The aircraft was substantially similar to that originally constructed by Roper et al, but with a number of detail changes.

The Jupiter was a single-place shoulder-wing monoplane, with a pylon-mounted pusher propeller. The wing's primary structure was a spruce and balsa spar, with the secondary structure being made up of balsa ribs spaced 3 in (7.6 cm) apart. The wing had a constant chord centre section, with no dihedral, with the wing's outer panels having both taper and dihedral. Differential ailerons were incorporated into the outer wing panels. The fuselage was of the pod and boom type. The forward structure, used to support the pilot and the drive system, was made of steel tubing, with the rest of the fuselage being made of spruce and balsa. The pilot was placed in a conventional cycling position, and powered a pylon-mounted pusher propeller via a chain drive. The undercarriage consisted of a single geared bicycle wheel. The empennage consisted of a fin and rudder, and an all-flying tail-plane. Lateral and directional control was through a horizontal control bar which could be pivoted in two dimensions, and pitch control was by a twist grip to the starboard side of the bar. The entire aircraft was covered in a silver Melinex plastic film, with the exception of the top forward section of the fuselage which is covered with a transparent film.

Due to RAF Halton having only grass airfields, the aircraft was transferred over to RAF Benson, South Oxfordshire to take advantage of the latter's paved runways. The Jupiter first flew on 9 February 1972, covering approximately 200 yd (180 m). In a flight programme which continued through to the end of May 1972, and with Potter as a pilot, 60 flights were made. During that period, Potter amassed approximately 1 hour's worth of flying time.

On 29 May 1972, Potter flew a distance of 1,171 yd (1,071 m), in a flight which lasted 1 minute 47.4 seconds. This flight, which was officially observed, set new distance and duration records for a human-powered aircraft. Another, not officially observed, covered 1,355 yd (1,239 m), and ended only due to the Jupiter having reached the end of the runway.

The aircraft is now in storage at the Foulton Halbard collection at Filching Manor, Wealden, East Sussex.

== Specifications ==
Data from Jane's all the world's aircraft 1972-73

General characteristics

- Crew: 1
- Length: 29 ft 6 in (8.99 m)
- Wingspan: 80 ft (24 m)
- Height: 10 ft (3.0 m) (propeller blades horizontal)
- Wing area: 300 sq ft (28 m^{2})
- Aspect ratio: 20.7
- Airfoil: NACA 65_{3}618
- Empty weight: 146 lb (66 kg)
- Gross weight: 300 lb (136 kg)
- Propellers: 2-bladed, 9 ft (2.7 m) diameter fixed-pitch, 150 rpm

Performance

- Maximum speed: 30 mph (48 km/h, 26 kn)
- Cruise speed: 20 mph (32 km/h, 17 kn)
- Stall speed: 18 mph (29 km/h, 16 kn)
- Wing loading: 1.00 lb/sq ft (4.9 kg/m^{2})

== See also ==
Aircraft of comparable role, configuration, and era

- HMPAC Puffin
- Malliga 1
- MacCready Gossamer Albatross
- MacCready Gossamer Condor
- Paxton man-powered aircraft
- Weybridge Mercury
- Wright Micron

Related lists

- List of Human-powered aircraft
