= Writer (disambiguation) =

A writer is someone who uses written words to communicate ideas.

Writer may also refer to:

- Writer (album), a 1970 album by Carole King
- LibreOffice Writer, a word processor, forked from OpenOffice.org Writer
- J.R. Writer (born 1984), American hip-hop recording artist
- The Writer, an American monthly magazine for writers
- "The Writer" (song), a 2010 song by Ellie Goulding
- Writers (TV series), a British comedy-drama web and television series
- Stuck in Love, a 2012 film previously titled Writers
- Writer (film), a 2021 Indian Tamil-language film
- Writer Inc., a Generative AI Software as a Service (SaaS) company
- Writer, the title of a clerk in the British Royal Navy
- A member of the Society of Writers to His Majesty's Signet in Scotland
- Writer, title of a clerk in the East India Company
- A graffiti artist

== See also ==
- Write (disambiguation)
- Composer
