= Geology of Pluto =

Geologic structure and composition of Pluto

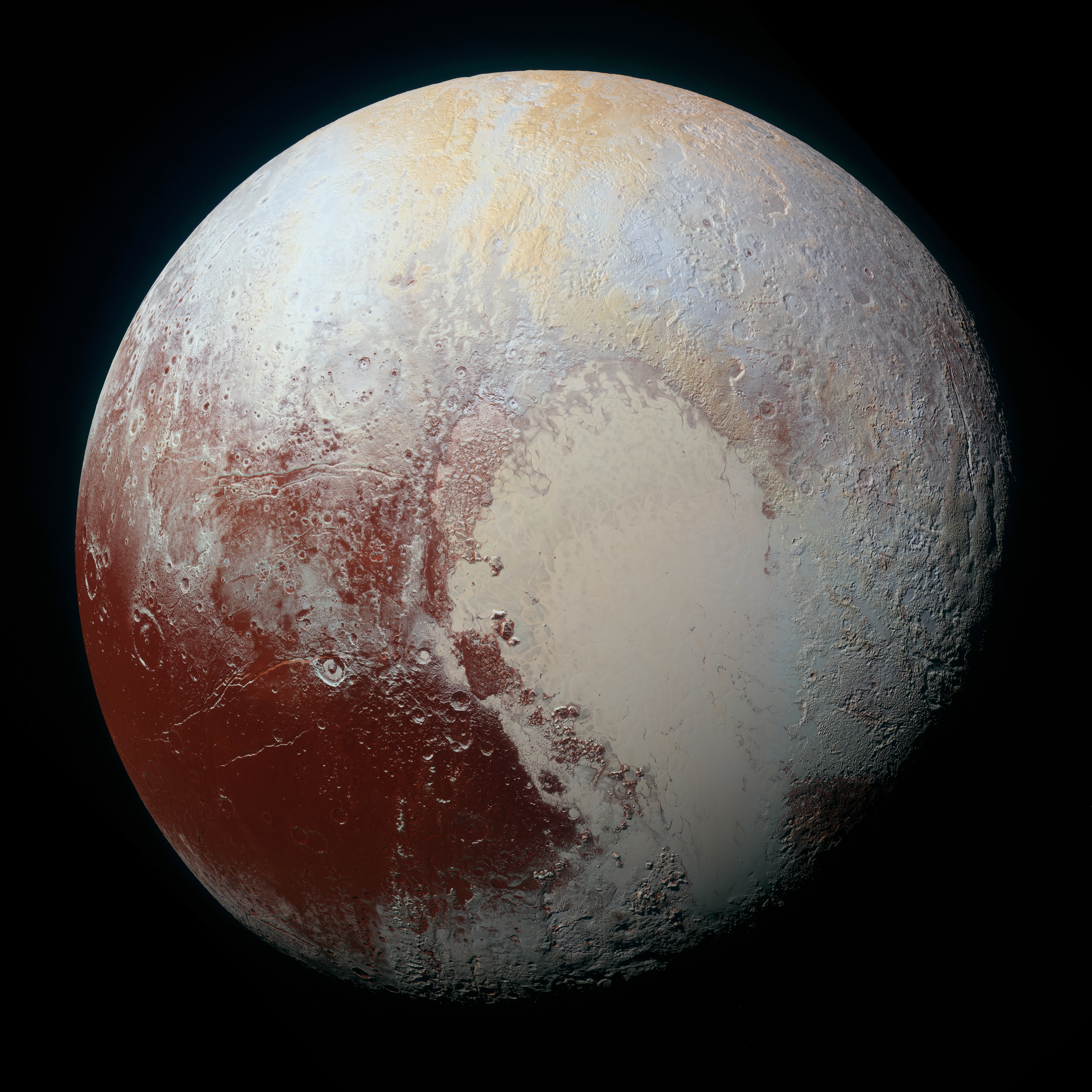
High-resolution MVIC view of Pluto in enhanced color, illustrating variations in surface composition

The geology of Pluto consists of the characteristics of the surface, crust, and interior of Pluto. Because of Pluto's distance from Earth, in-depth study from Earth is difficult. Many details about Pluto remained unknown until 14 July 2015, when New Horizons flew through the Pluto system and began transmitting data back to Earth. When it did, Pluto was found to have remarkable geologic diversity, with New Horizons team member Jeff Moore saying that it "is every bit as complex as that of Mars". The final New Horizons Pluto data transmission was received on 25 October 2016. In June 2020, astronomers reported evidence that Pluto may have had a subsurface ocean, and consequently may have been habitable, when it was first formed.

== Surface ==
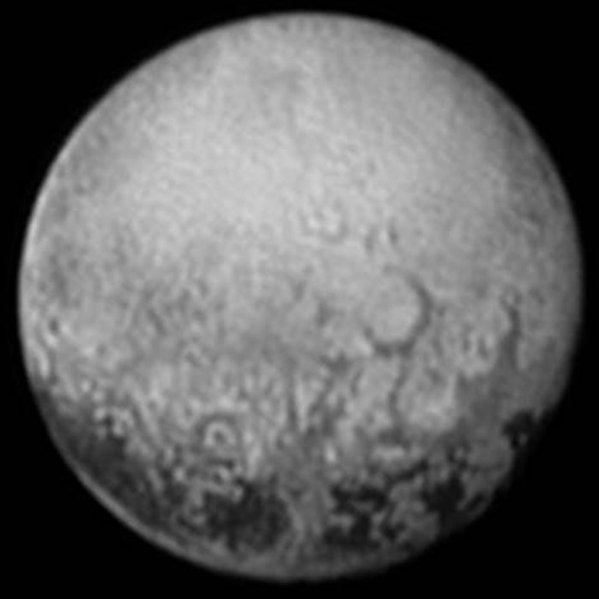
Polygonal feature north of the dark equatorial regions on Pluto (11 July 2015)

More than 98 percent of Pluto's surface consists of solid nitrogen, with traces of methane and carbon monoxide. The face of Pluto oriented toward Charon contains more solid methane, whereas the opposite face contains more nitrogen and solid carbon monoxide. Distribution of volatile ices is thought to be season-dependent and influenced more by solar insolation and topography than by subsurface processes.

Maps produced from images taken by the Hubble Space Telescope (HST), together with Pluto's light curve and the periodic variations in its infrared spectra, indicate that Pluto's surface is very varied, with large differences in both brightness and color, with albedos between 0.49 and 0.66. Pluto is one of the most contrastive bodies in the Solar System, with as much contrast as Saturn's moon Iapetus. The color varies between charcoal black, dark orange and white. New Horizons data suggest equally variable surface ages for Pluto, with ancient, dark, mountainous terrain occurring alongside the bright, flat, effectively craterless Sputnik Planitia and various terrains of intermediate age and color.

Pluto's surface color changed between 1994 and 2003: the northern polar region brightened and the southern hemisphere darkened. Pluto's overall redness also increased substantially between 2000 and 2002. These rapid changes probably relate to seasonal condensation and sublimation of portions of Pluto's atmosphere, amplified by Pluto's extreme axial tilt and high orbital eccentricity.

The portions of Pluto's surface mapped by New Horizons. Center is 180 degrees longitude (diametrically opposite the moon Charon).

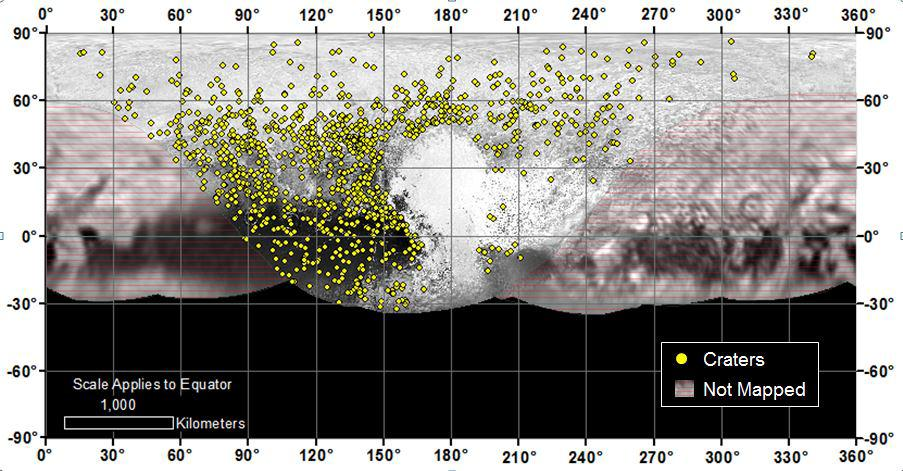
Distribution of over 1000 craters of all ages on Pluto. The variation in density indicates a long history of varying geological activity.

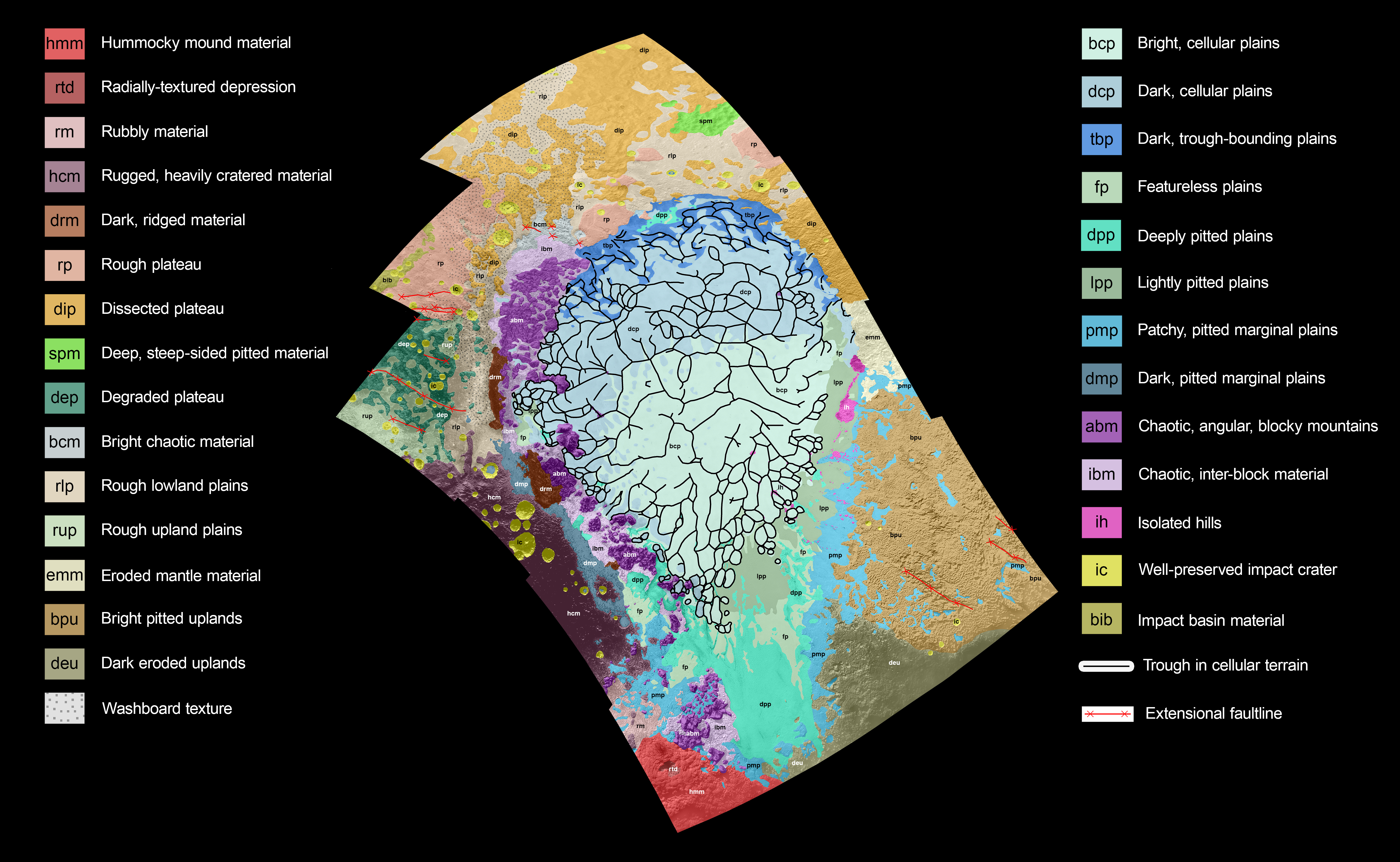
Geologic map of Sputnik Planitia and surroundings (context), with convection cell margins outlined in black

=== Soft-ice plains and glaciers ===
Sputnik Planitia appears to be composed of ices more volatile, softer and more dense than the water-ice bedrock of Pluto, including nitrogen, carbon monoxide and solid methane. A polygonal convection cell structure is visible over much of the planitia. No craters have been found, indicating that its surface must be less than 10 million years old. A number of mechanisms are proposed to explain the absence of craters, including cryovolcanism (volcanoes erupting volatiles instead of magma), convective overturn, and viscous relaxation – processes that would erase negative topography. Glaciers of what is probably solid nitrogen can be seen flowing from the planitia into adjacent depressions and craters. Nitrogen from the plain appears to have been carried via the atmosphere and deposited in a thin layer of ice on uplands to the east and south of the plain, forming the large bright eastern lobe of Tombaugh Regio. Glaciers appear to be flowing back into the planitia through valleys from these eastern highlands.

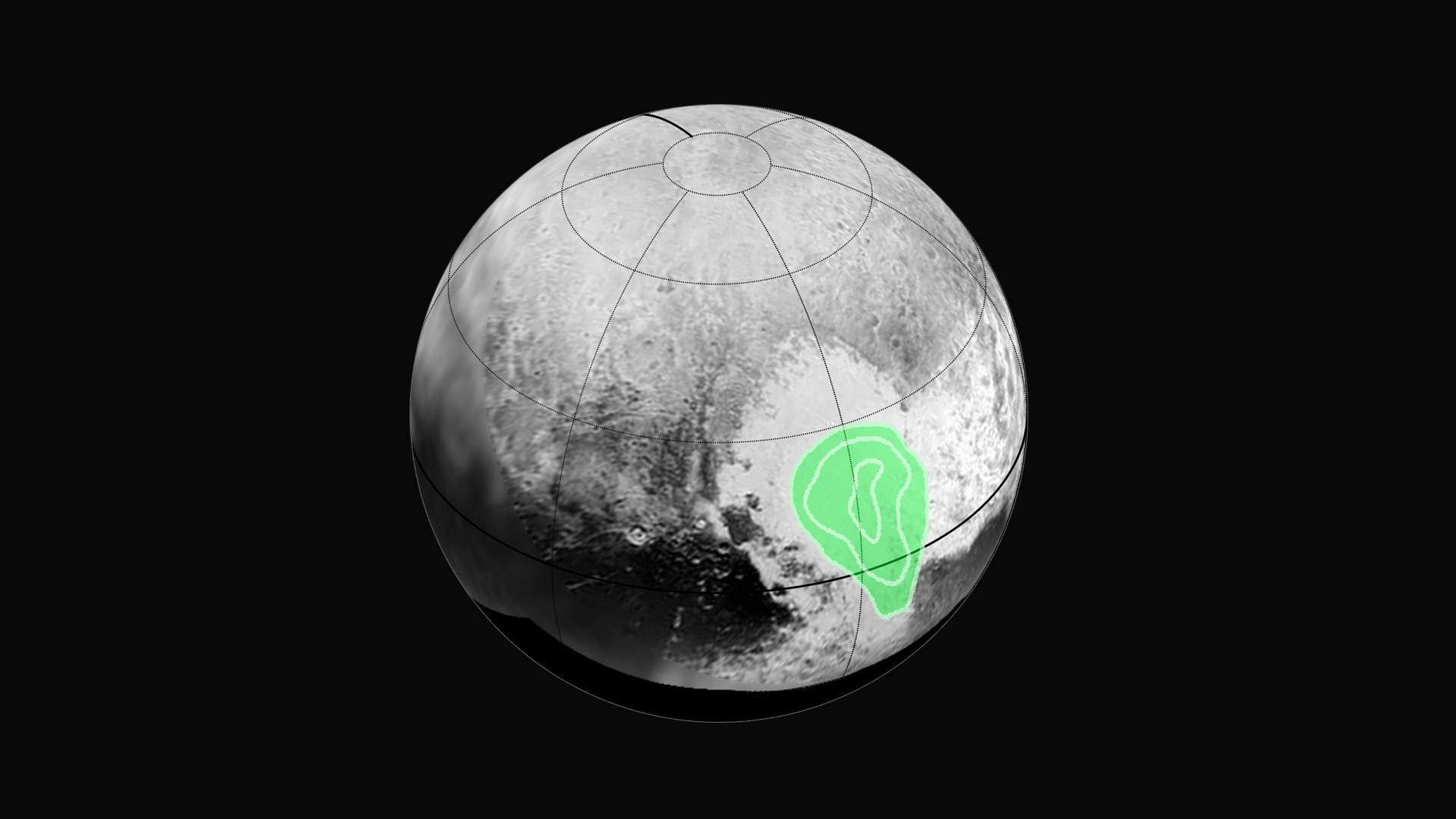
Localization of frozen carbon monoxide in Sputnik Planitia (shorter contours represent higher concentrations).

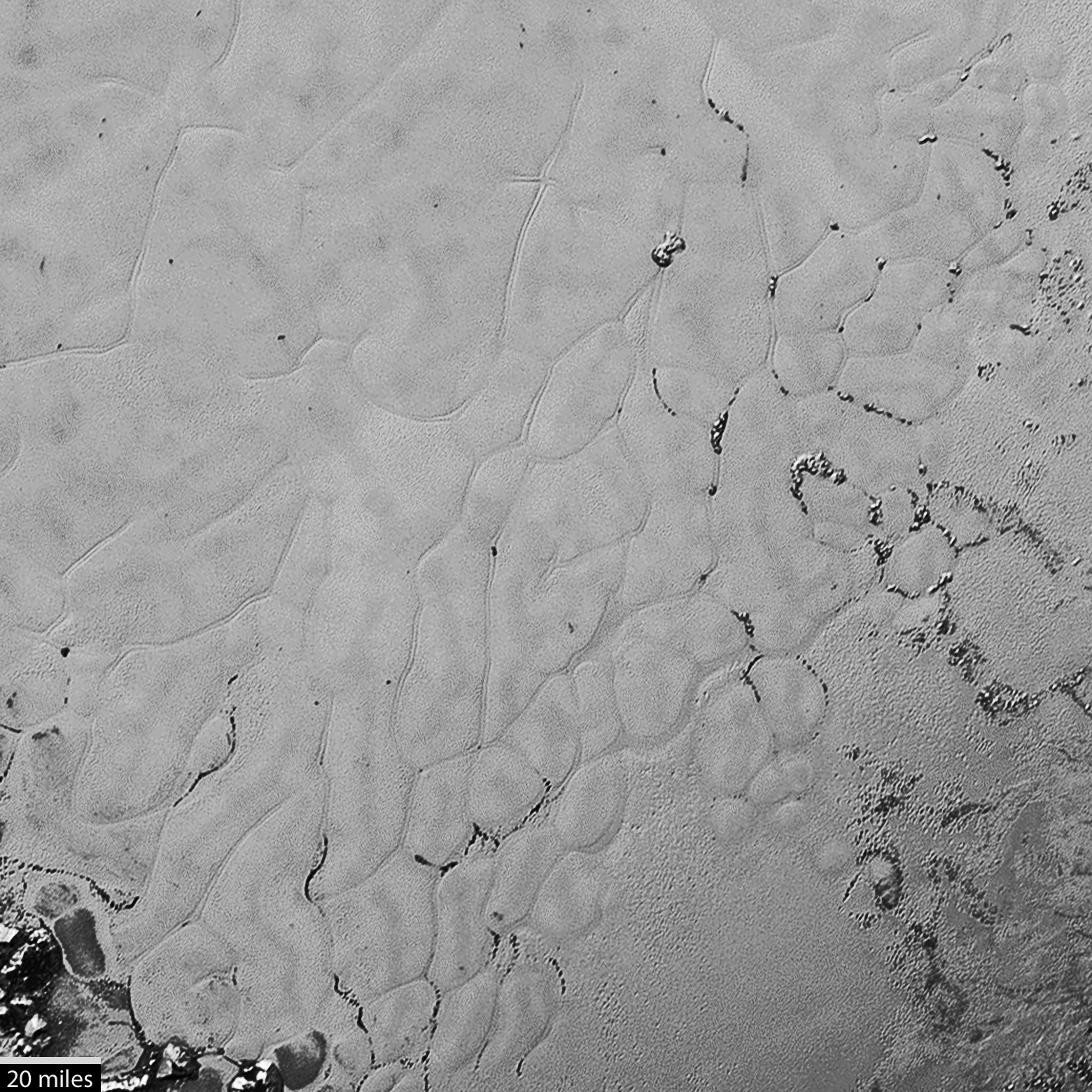
Polygonal ice patterns in southern Sputnik Planitia (context) due to convection. Dark spots in the troughs at lower left are pits.

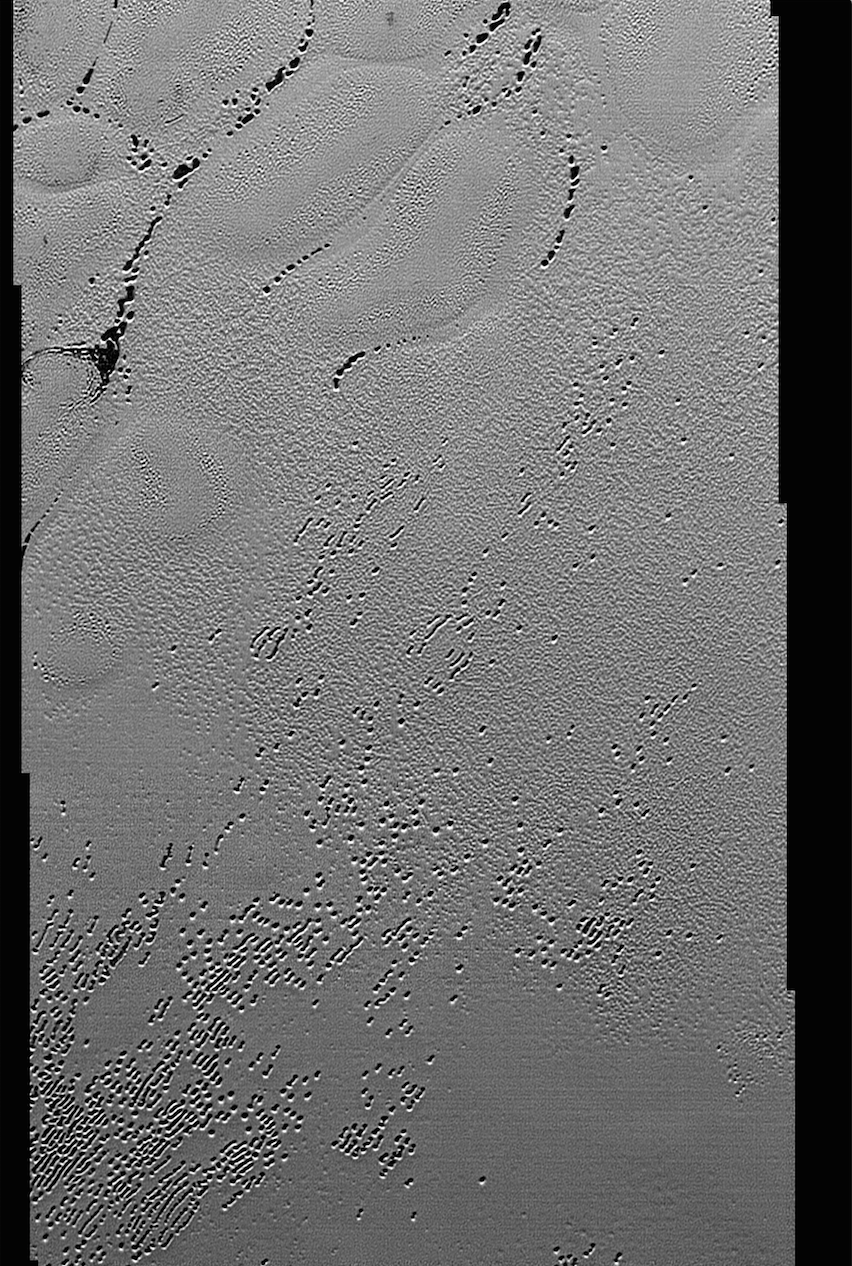
Closeup view of sublimation pits (context) in Sputnik Planitia

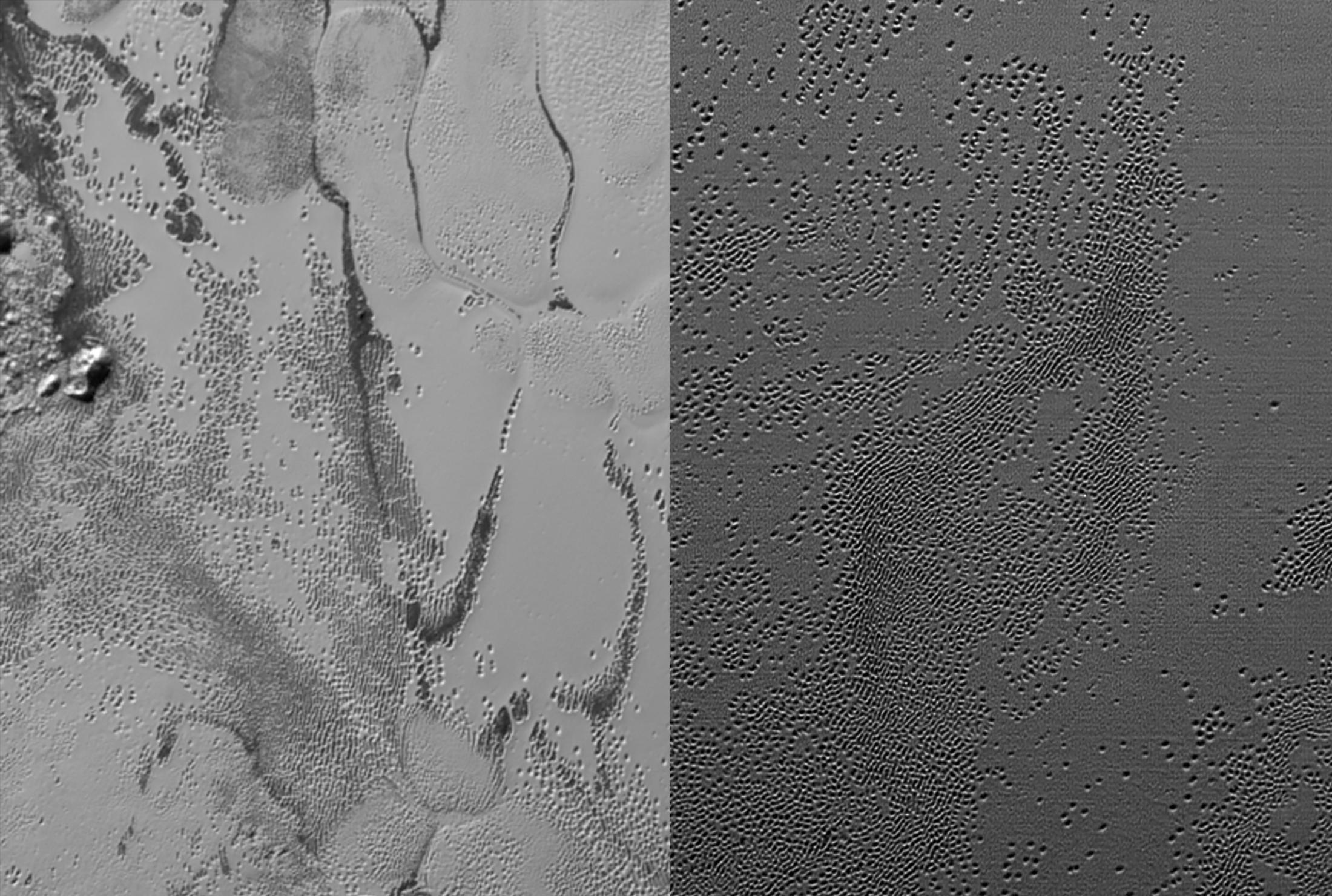
Additional views of Sputnik Planitia sublimation pits (context); some (left image) have dark material within

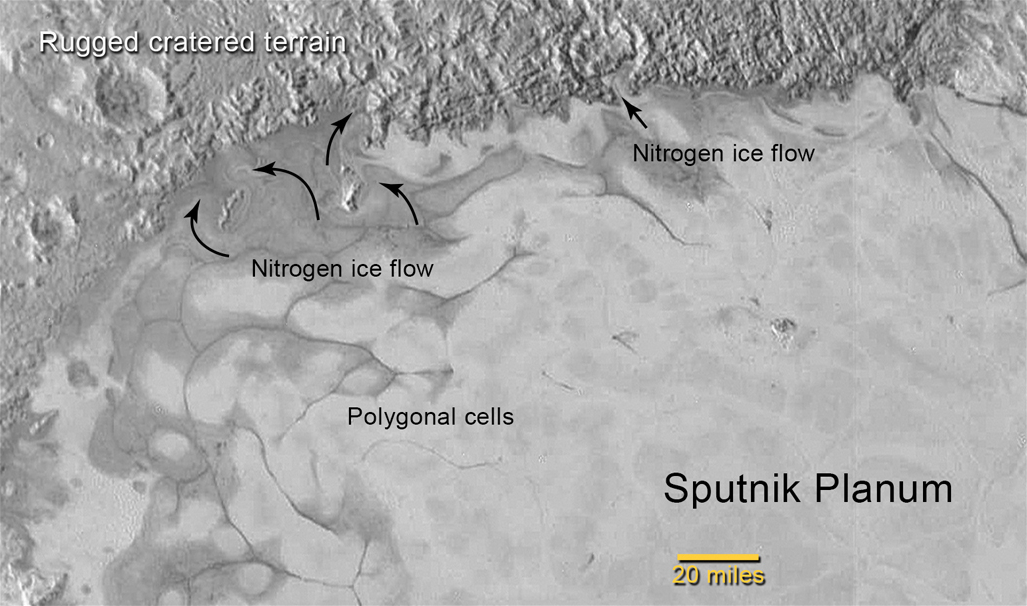
The northern edge of Sputnik Planitia (context), with indications of nitrogen ice flowing into and filling adjacent depressions.

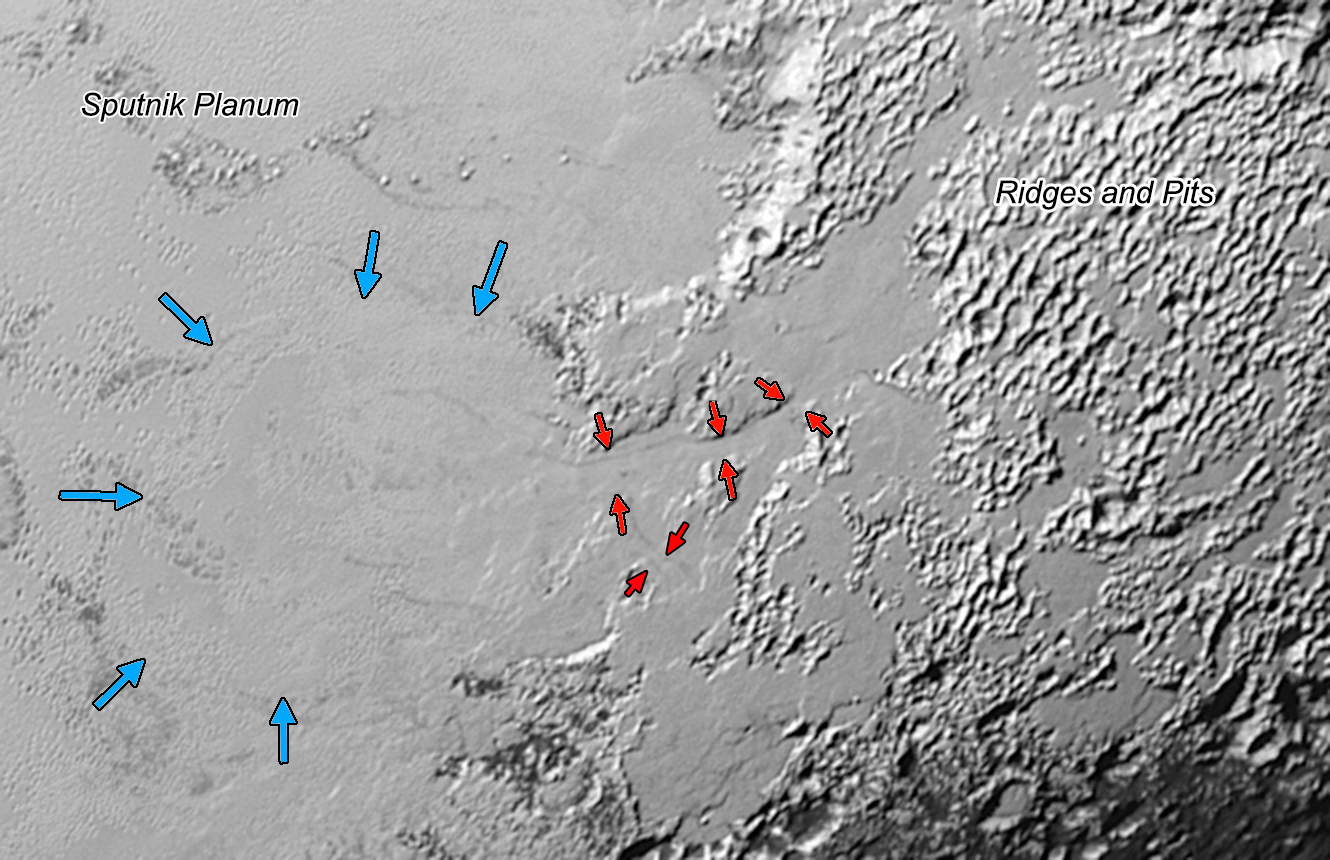
Nitrogen ice glaciers flow from uplands through valleys into east Sputnik Planitia (context). Arrows indicate valley sides (which are 3 to 8 km apart) and the flow front in the planitia.

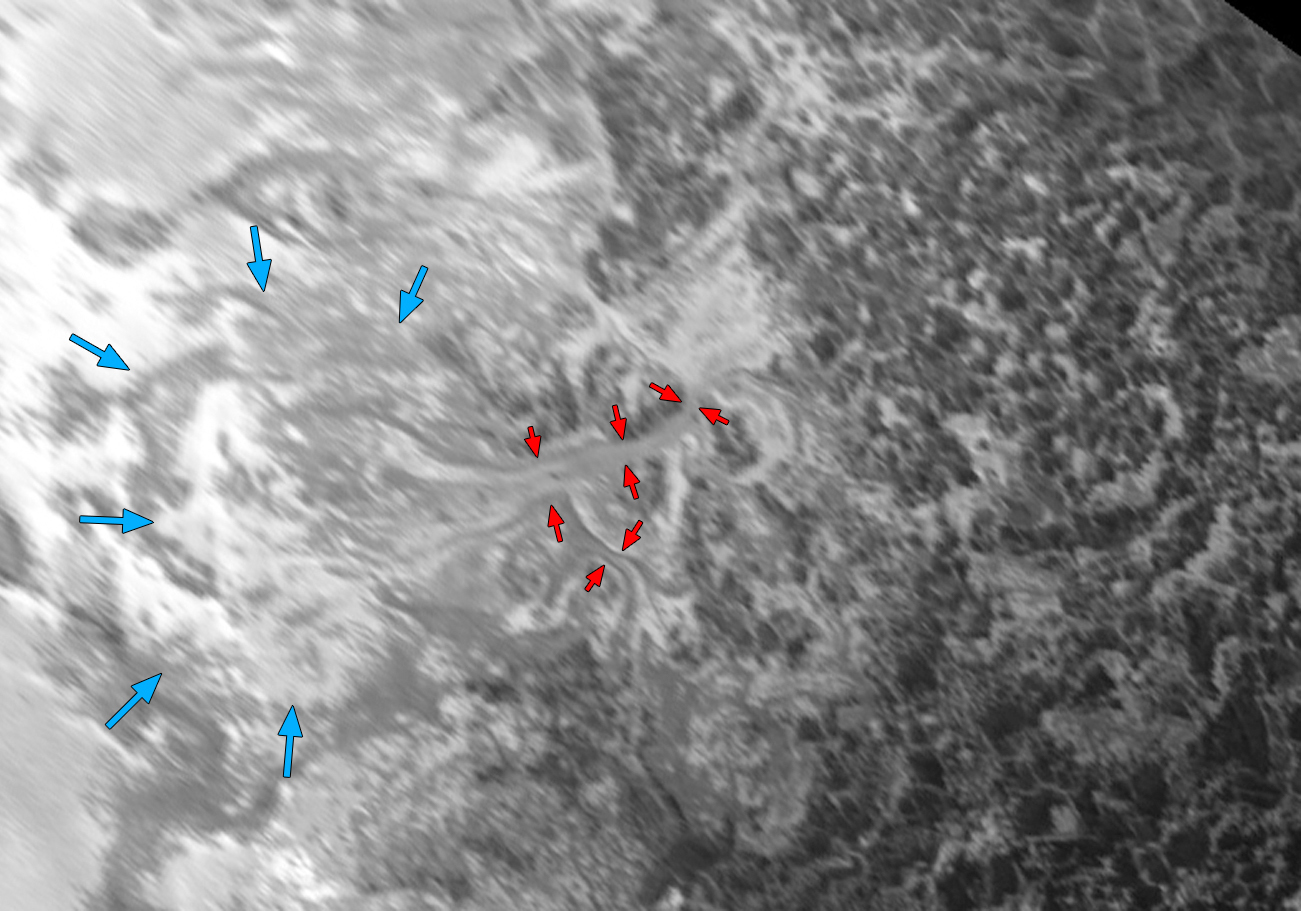
Nitrogen ice glaciers flowing into the eastern margin of the planitia (similar reprojected backlit view highlighting flow lines).

=== Water-ice mountains ===
Mountains several kilometres high occur along the southwestern and southern edges of Sputnik Planitia. Water ice is the only ice detected on Pluto that is strong enough at Plutonian temperatures to support such heights.

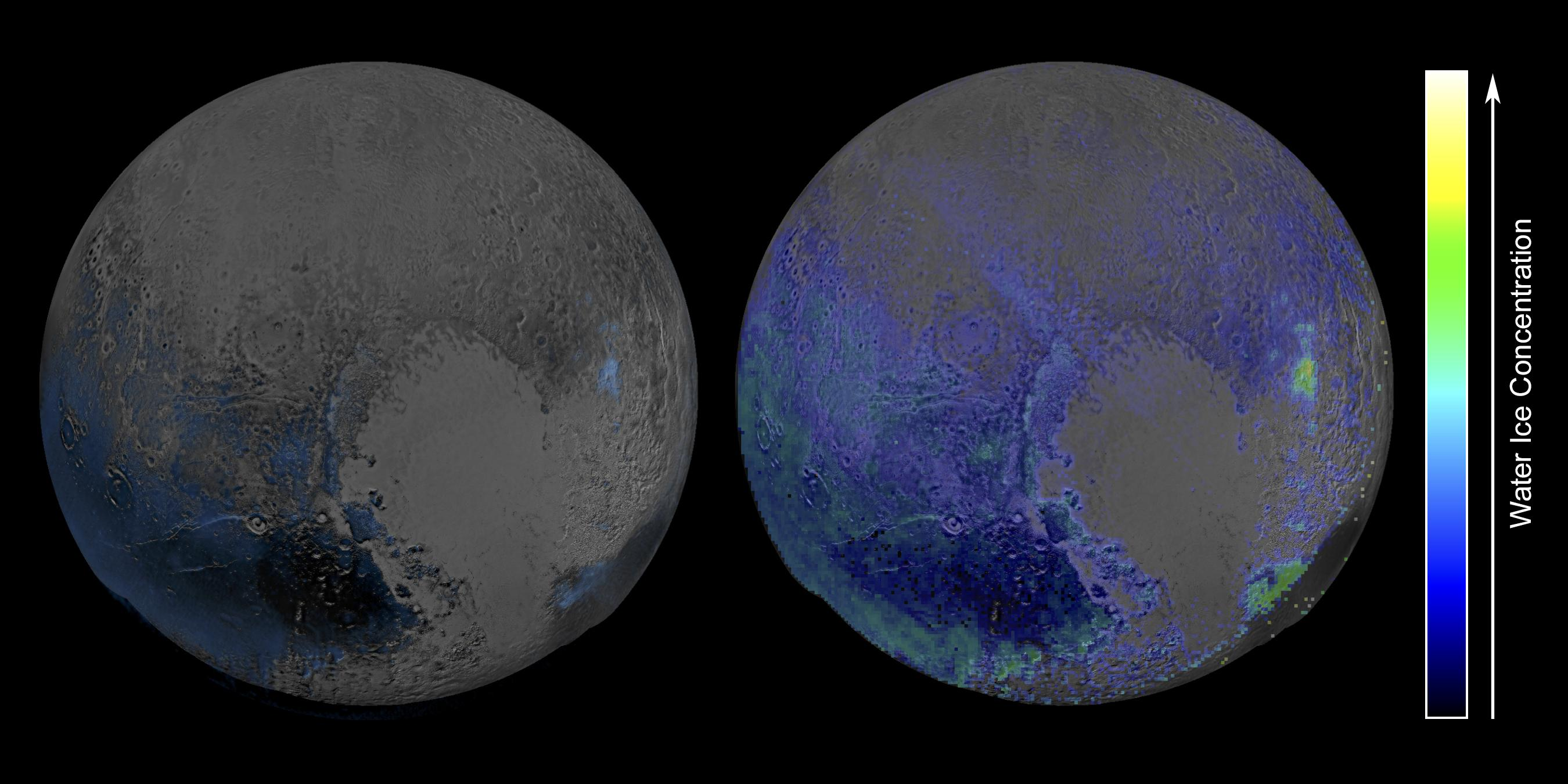
Pluto - water ice distribution (false color; rel 29 January 2016)

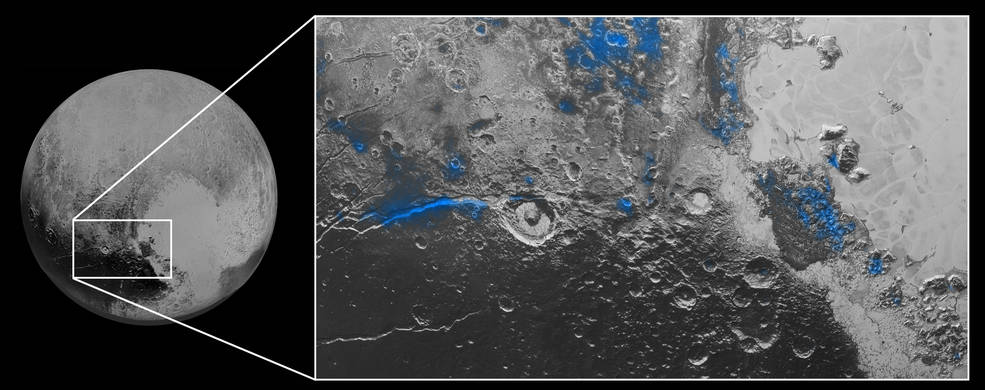
Regions where water ice has been detected (blue regions)

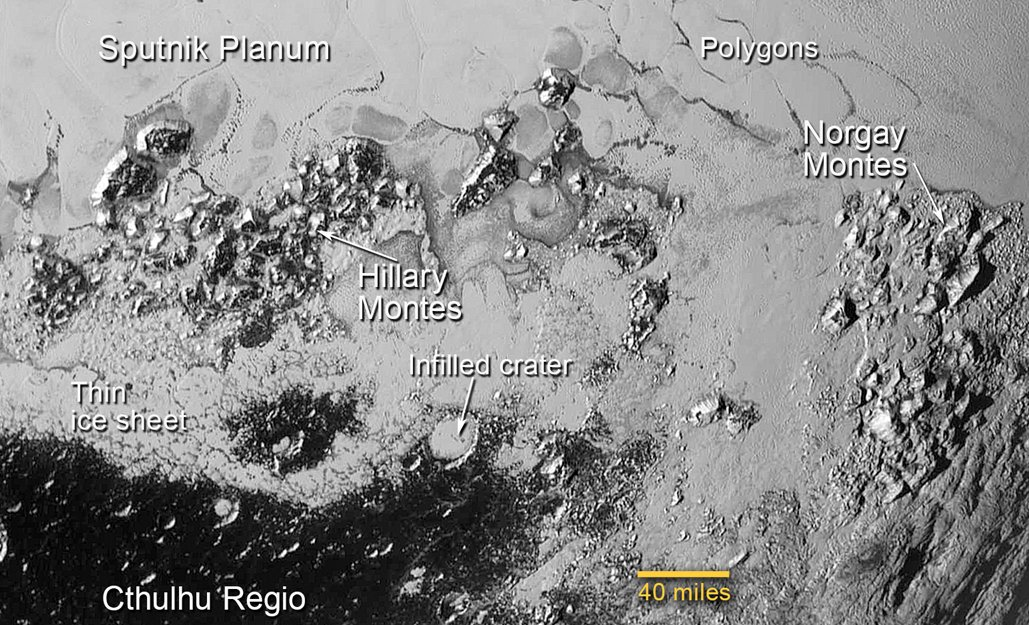
Hillary Montes and Tenzing Montes (labeled Norgay Montes) lie between Sputnik Planitia (top) and Belton Regio (bottom).

=== Ancient cratered terrain ===
Belton Regio and other dark areas have many craters and signatures of solid methane. The dark red color is thought to be due to tholins falling out of Pluto's atmosphere.

=== Northern latitudes ===
The mid-northern latitudes display a variety of terrain reminiscent of the surface of Triton. A polar cap consisting of solid methane "diluted in a thick, transparent slab of solid nitrogen" is somewhat darker and redder.

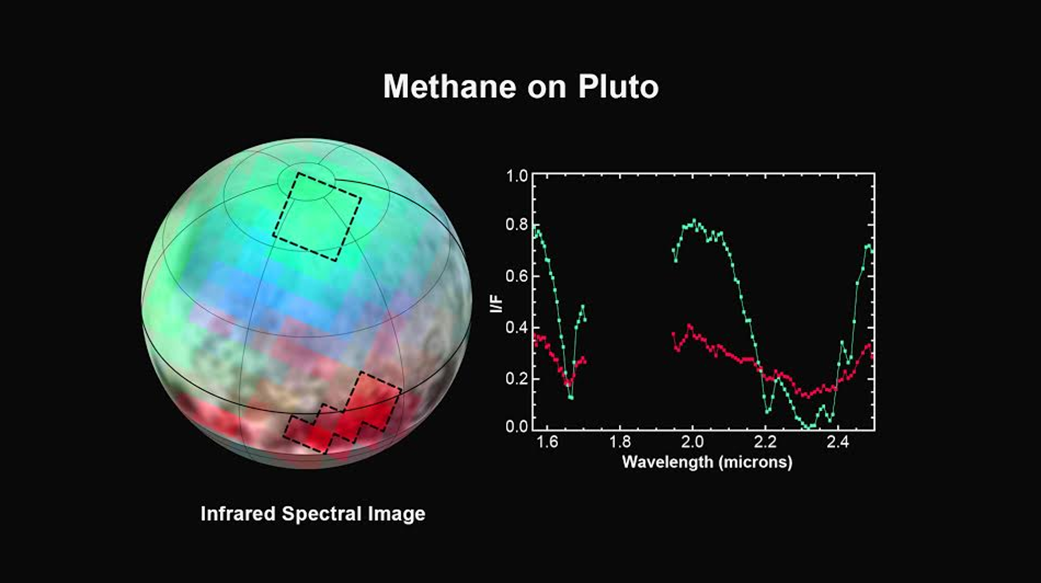
Distribution of methane ice on Pluto. Bright green is the polar cap; bright red is Harrington Regio.

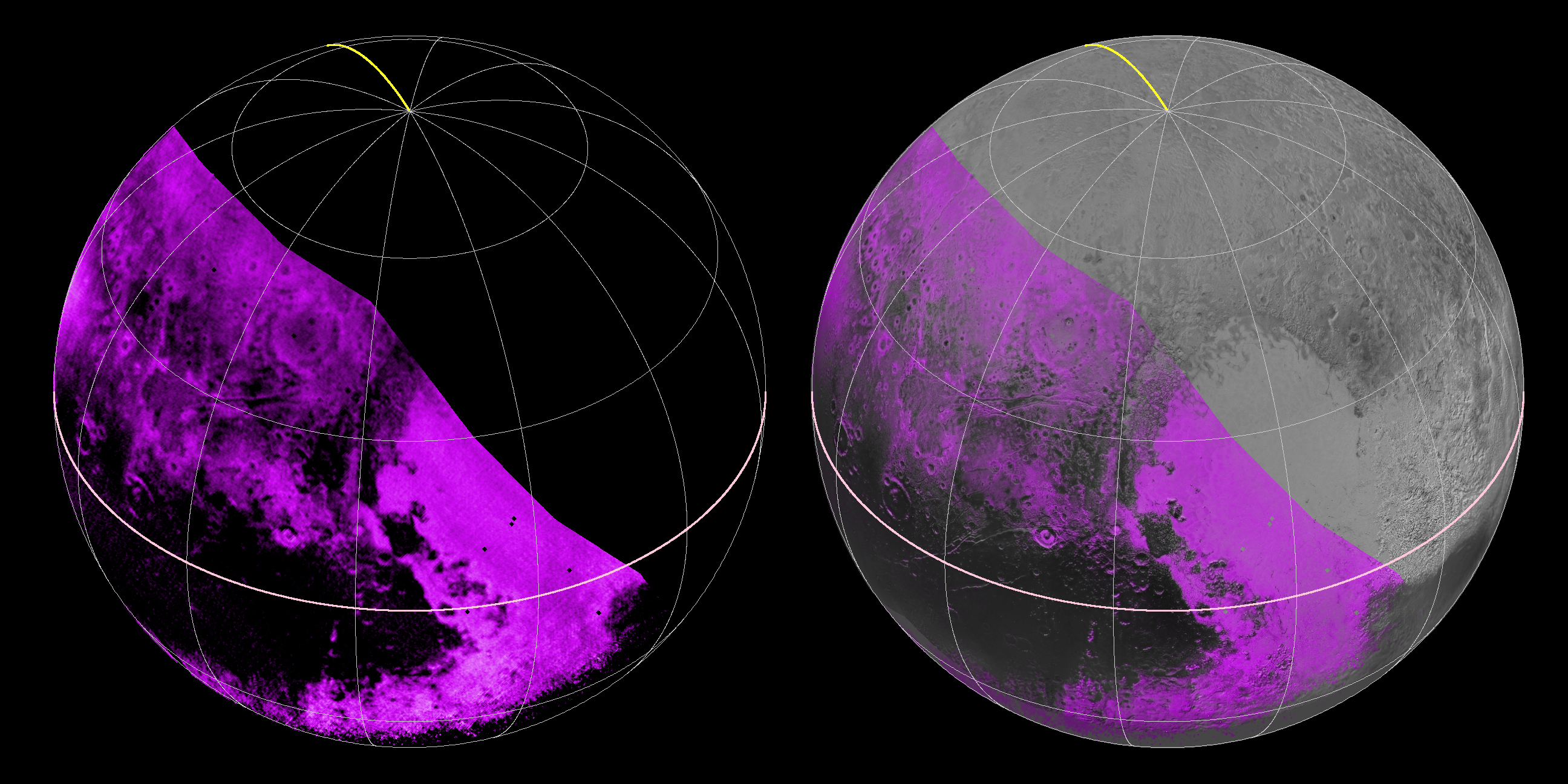
Map of methane ice abundance, which shows striking regional differences. Stronger methane absorption indicated by the brighter purple colors here, and lower abundances shown in black.

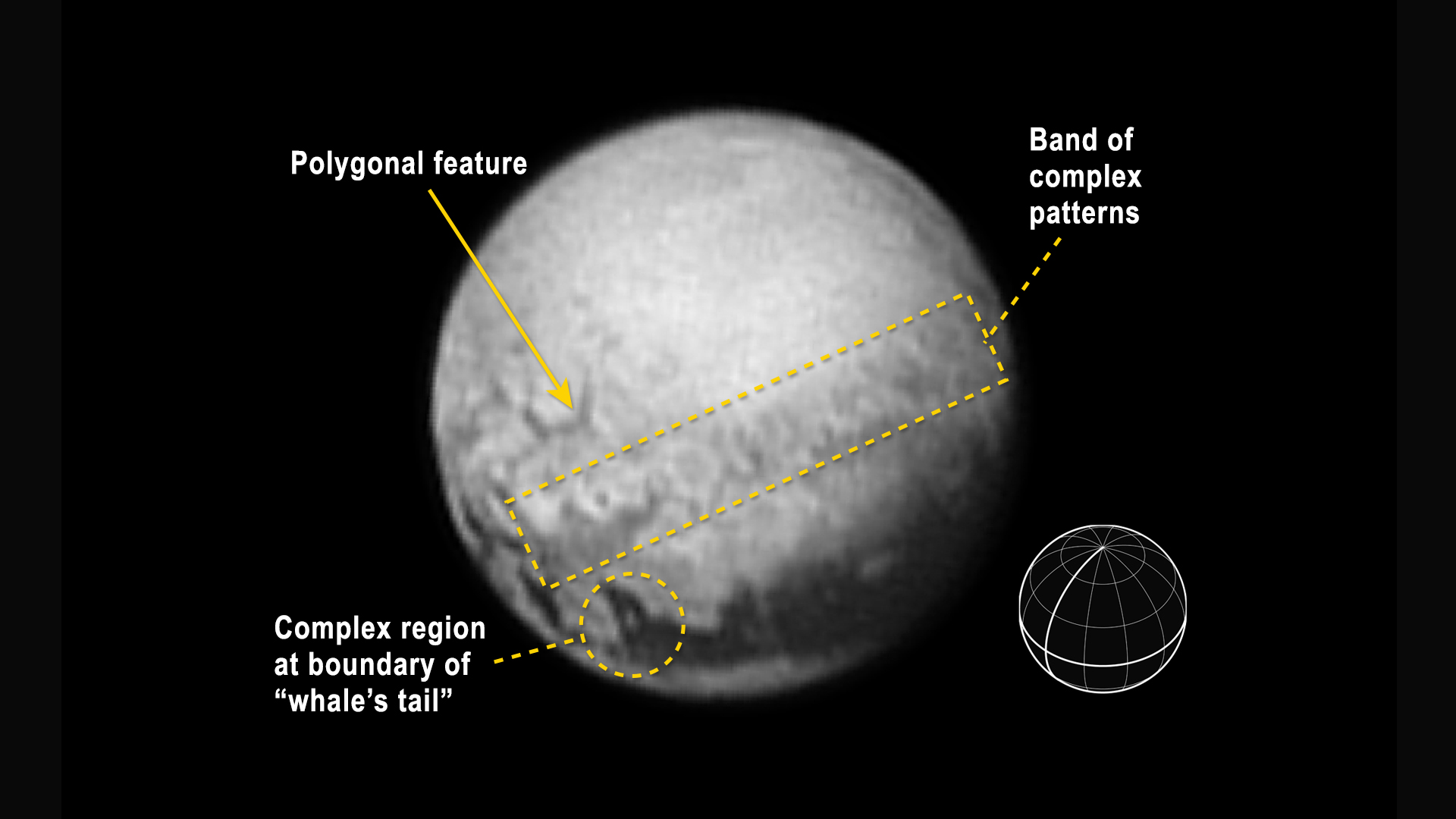
Indications of complex geological features north of the dark equatorial regions

=== Tartarus Dorsa ===
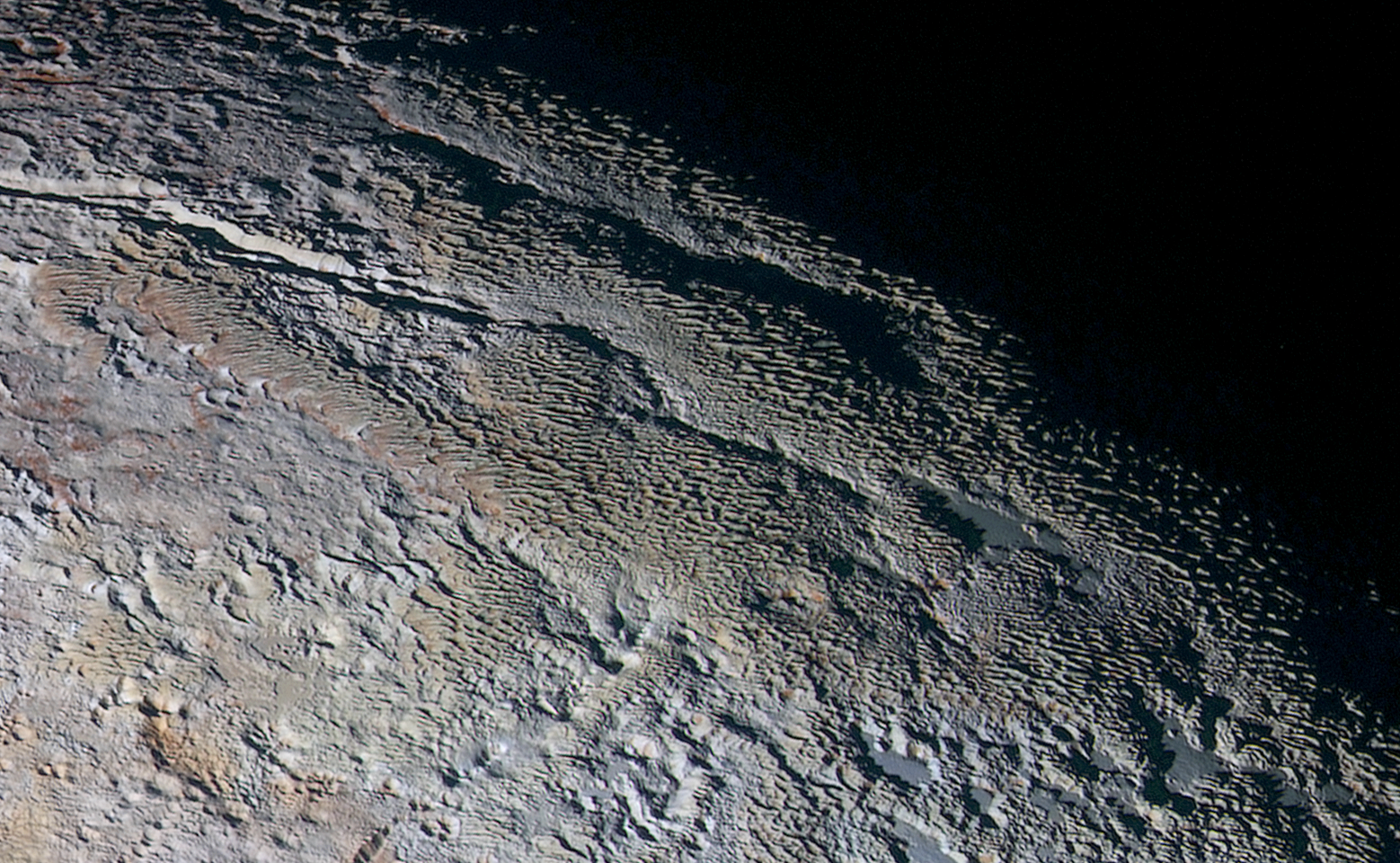
Snakeskin terrain formed by penitentes covering Tartarus Dorsa.

The western part of Pluto's northern hemisphere consists of an extensive, highly distinctive set of 500-meter-high mountains informally named Tartarus Dorsa; the spacing and shape of the mountains looks similar to scales or to tree bark. A January 2017 Nature paper by Dr. John Moores and his colleagues identified these icy ridges as penitentes. Penitentes are icy depressions formed by erosion and surrounded by tall spires. Pluto is the only planetary body other than Earth on which penitentes have been identified. Although penitentes have been hypothesized on Jupiter's satellite Europa, current theories suggest they may require an atmosphere to form. Moores and his colleagues hypothesize that Pluto's penitentes grow only during periods of high atmospheric pressure, at a rate of approximately 1 centimeter per orbital cycle. These penitentes appear to have formed in the last few tens-of-millions of years, an idea supported by the sparsity of craters in the region, making Tartarus Dorsa one of the youngest regions on Pluto.

Cutting through both Tartarus Dorsa and Pluto's heavily cratered northern terrain (and thus formed more recently than both) is a set of six canyons radiating from a single point; the longest, informally named Sleipnir Fossa, is over 580 kilometers long. These chasms are thought to have originated from pressures caused by material upwelling at the center of the formation.

=== Possible cryovolcanism ===
When New Horizons first sent back data from Pluto, Pluto was thought to be losing hundreds of tons of its atmosphere an hour to ultraviolet light from the Sun; such an escape rate would be too great to be resupplied by comet impacts. Instead, nitrogen was thought to be resupplied either by cryovolcanism or by geysers bringing it to the surface. Images of structures that imply upwelling of material from within Pluto, and streaks possibly left by geysers, support this view. Subsequent discoveries suggest that Pluto's atmospheric escape was overestimated by several thousand times and thus Pluto could theoretically keep its atmosphere without geological assistance, though evidence of ongoing geology remains strong.

Two possible cryovolcanoes, Wright Mons and Piccard Mons, have been identified in topographic maps of the region south of Sputnik Planitia, near the south pole. Both are over 150 km across and at least 4 km high, the tallest peaks known on Pluto at present. They are lightly cratered and thus geologically young, although not as young as Sputnik Planitia. They are characterized by a large summit depression and hummocky flanks. This represents the first time large potentially cryovolcanic constructs have been clearly imaged anywhere in the Solar System.

A 2019 study identified a second likely cryovolcanic structure around Virgil Fossae, a series of troughs in northeastern Belton Regio, west of Tombaugh Regio. Ammonia-rich cryolavas appear to have erupted from Virgil Fossae and several nearby sites and covered an area of several thousand square kilometers; the fact that the ammonia's spectral signal was detectable when New Horizons flew by Pluto suggests that Virgil Fossae is no older than one billion years and potentially far younger, as galactic cosmic rays would destroy all the ammonia in the upper meter of the crust in that time and solar radiation could destroy the surface ammonia 10 to 10000 times more quickly. The subsurface reservoir from which this cryomagma emerged may have been separate from Pluto's subsurface ocean.

Pluto - possible cryovolcanoes

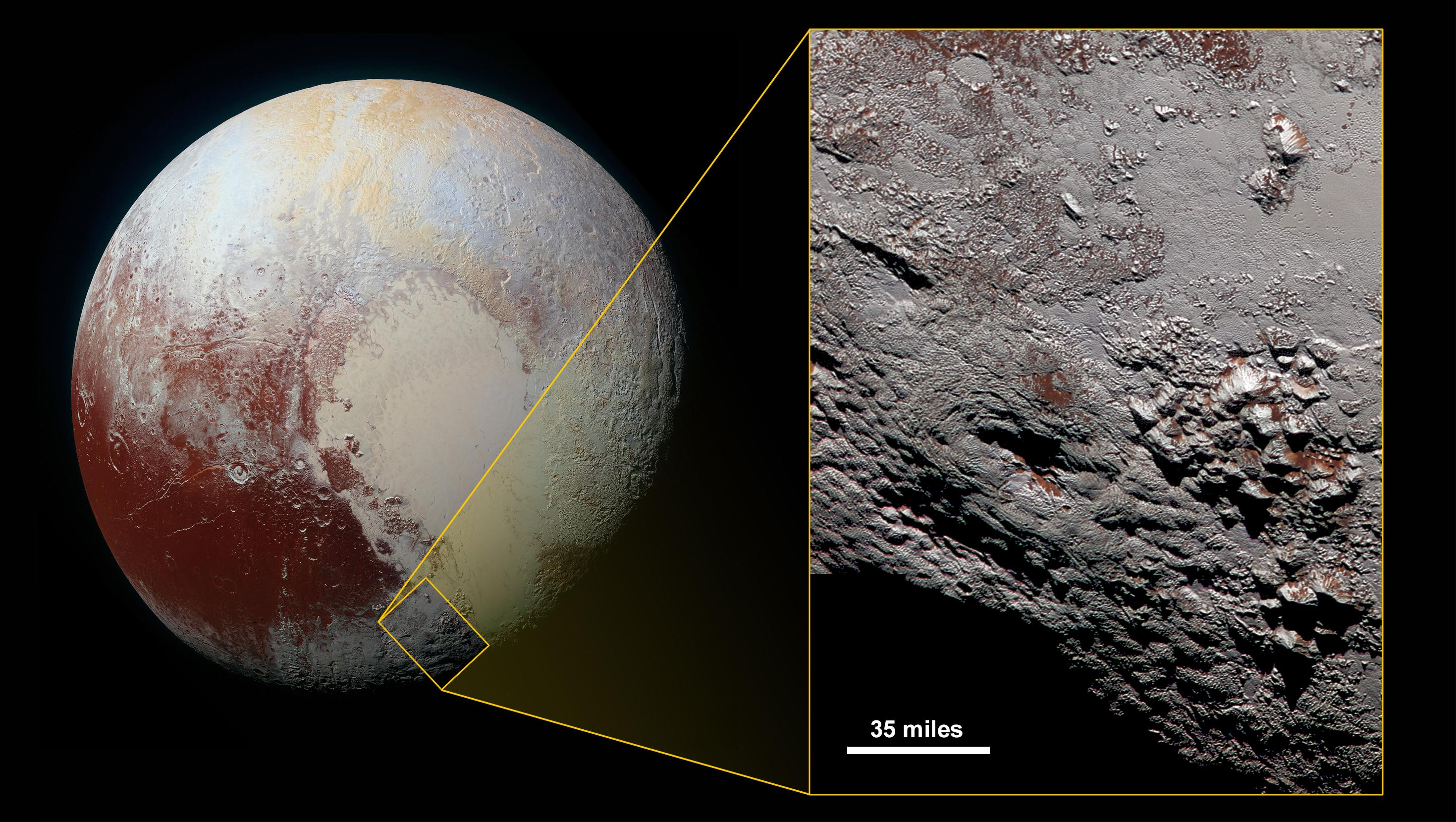
Wright Mons (overall context)

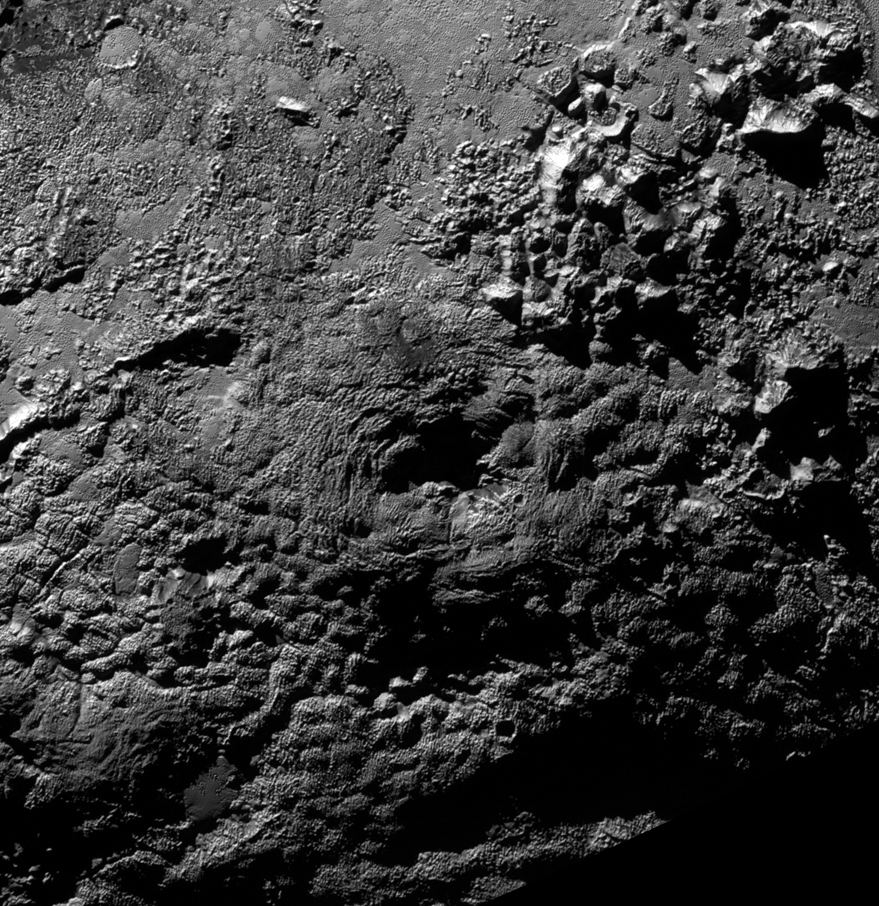
Wright Mons, displaying its central depression ( source image (context))

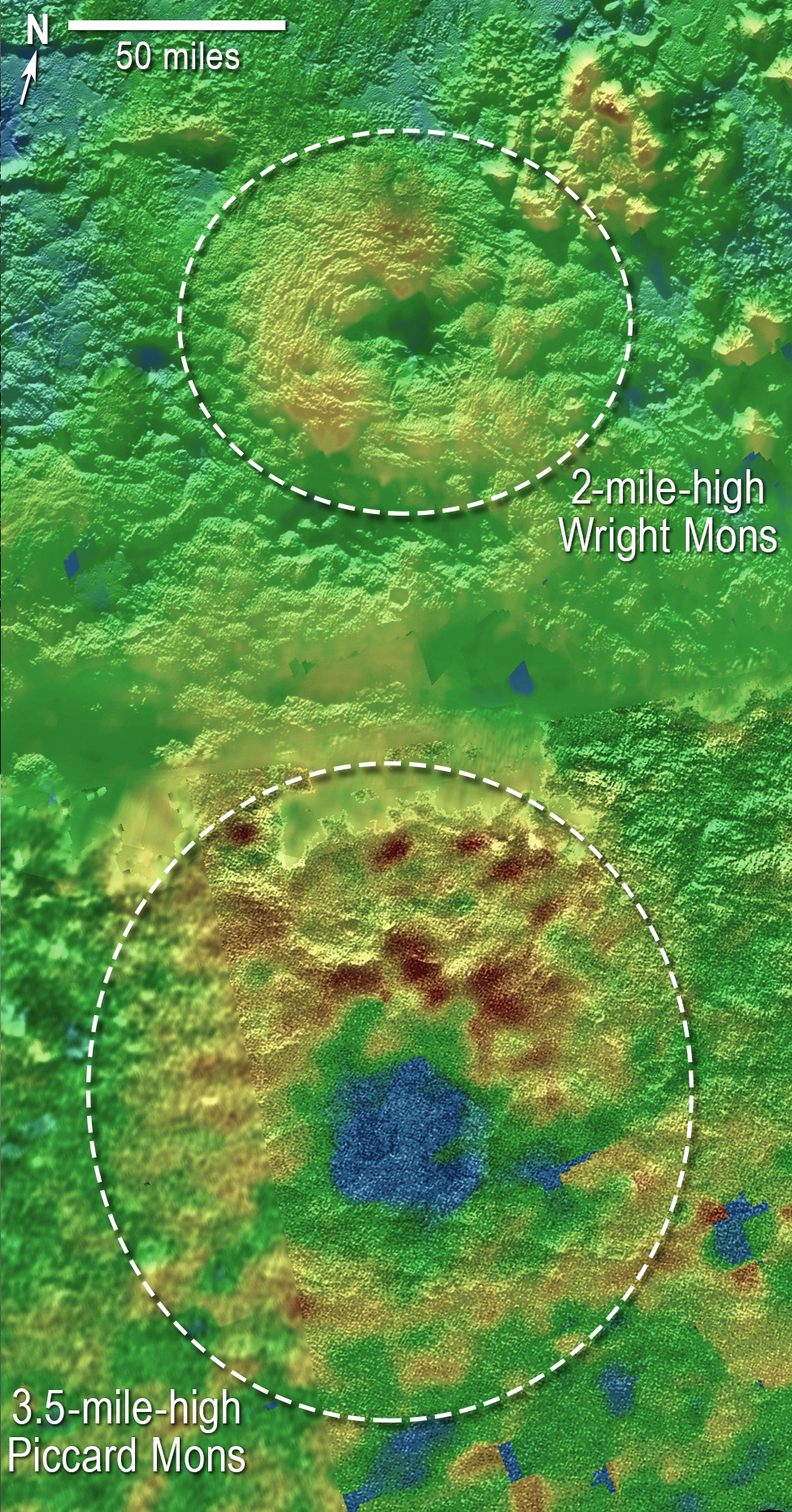
3D map showing Wright Mons (above) and Piccard Mons

== Internal structure ==
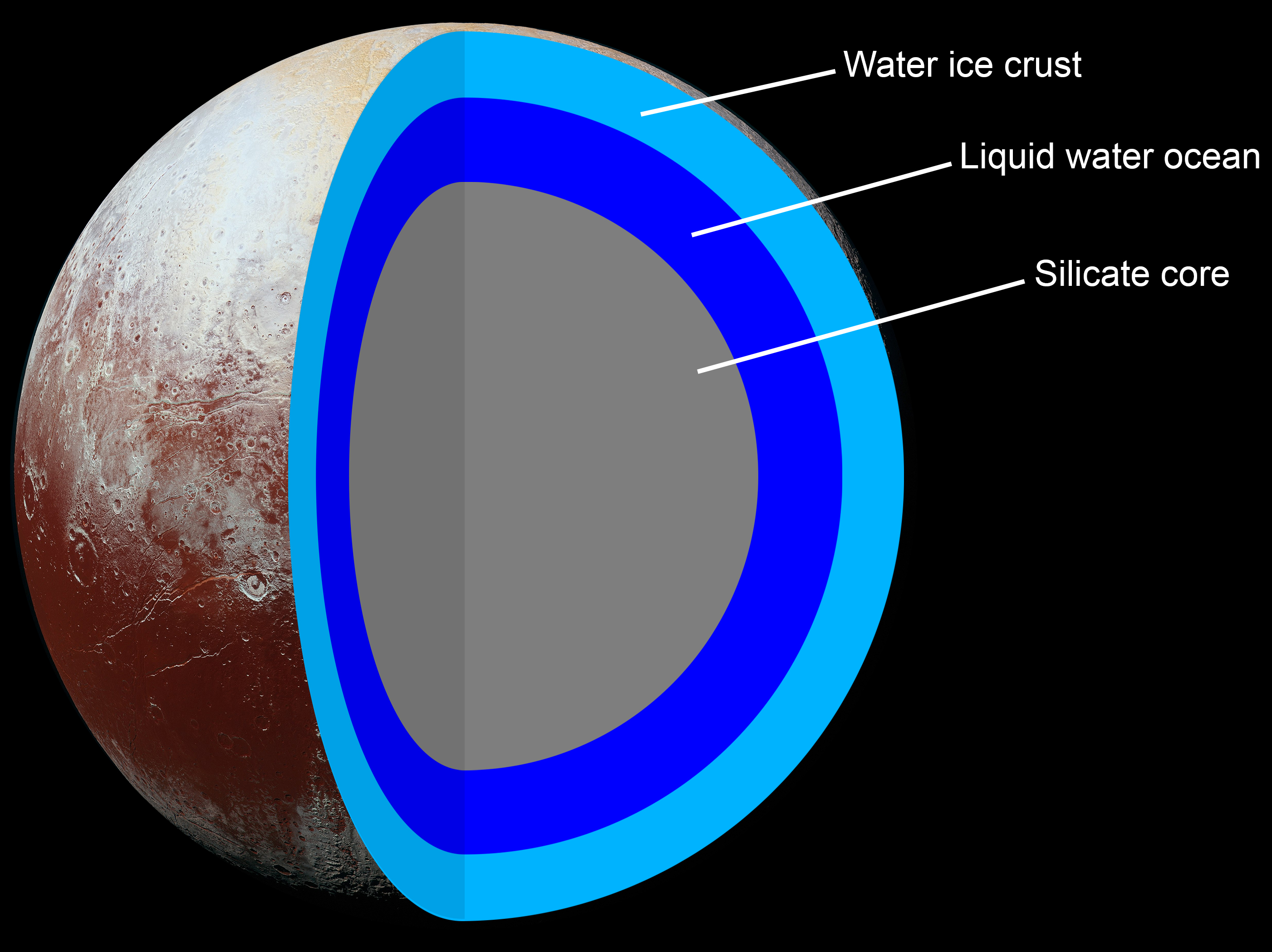
Pluto's pre–New Horizons theoretical structure: Water ice crust; Liquid water ocean; Silicate core

Pluto's density is 1.87 g/cm^{3}. Because the decay of radioactive elements would eventually heat the ices enough for the rock to separate from them, scientists think that Pluto's internal structure is differentiated, with the rocky material having settled into a dense core surrounded by a mantle of water ice. Pluto's abundant surface volatiles imply that Pluto is either completely differentiated (and thus has liberated all of the volatiles that had been locked away in its water ice) or formed within less than a million years after the circumstellar disk was cleared (when volatiles were still available to be incorporated into Pluto).

The diameter of the core is hypothesized to be approximately 1700 km, 70% of Pluto's diameter. It is possible that such heating continues today, creating a subsurface ocean layer of liquid water and ammonia some 100 to 180 km thick at the core–mantle boundary. Studies based on New Horizon's images of Pluto reveal no signs of contraction (as would be expected if Pluto's internal water had all frozen and turned into ice II) and imply that Pluto's interior is still expanding, probably due to this internal ocean; this is the first concrete evidence that Pluto's interior is still liquid. Pluto is proposed to have a thick water-ice lithosphere, based on the length of individual faults and lack of localized uplift. Differing trends in the faults suggest previously active tectonics, though its mechanisms remain unknown. The DLR Institute of Planetary Research calculated that Pluto's density-to-radius ratio lies in a transition zone, along with Neptune's moon Triton, between icy satellites like the mid-sized moons of Uranus and Saturn, and rocky satellites such as Jupiter's Io.

Pluto has no magnetic field.

== Geologic periods ==
Pluto's geologic history has been tentatively divided into four periods for the regions closely observed by New Horizons, each named after an associated significant feature: the Burneyan, representing the oldest, most cratered terrain; the Hayabusan, representing middle-aged, eroded terrain; the Tartaran, representing relatively young terrain associated with the sublimation and deposition of volatiles; and Sputnikian, representing the very young ice deposits of Sputnik Planitia.

Plutonian time periods (millions of years ago)

== See also ==
- List of geological features on Pluto
