= Wright Falcon =

1970s British single-seat glider

Falcon

General information
- Type: Single-seat glider
- National origin: United Kingdom
- Manufacturer: Peter Wright

History
- First flight: 16 September 1979

The Wright Falcon was a single-seat glider designed and built by British engineer Peter Wright in the late 1970s. He had previously built two human-powered aircraft, the MPA Mk 1 and the Micron.

== Design and development ==
Wright intended the Falcon to be a light and simple glider capable of being made within a few months. It was built to Standard Class rules, and was constructed mostly of composites and fibre-glass.

The glider had a cantilevered monoplane wing with a slightly tapered planform. Two split-flap airbrakes were incorporated into the trailing edge of the wing. The fuselage was moulded in two halves and featured a detachable canopy, along with a mono-wheel undercarriage. It had a V-tail which had an included angle of 80°.

Design commenced in 1975, with construction initially taking place in a disused broiler shed that Wright had access to. The build site then transferred to Wright's home, with the build being completed there.

== Operational history ==
The glider flew for the first time on 16 September 1979 at Saltby Airfield, the home airfield of the Buckminster Gliding Club in Leicestershire. Brian Spreckley, then the British Gliding Association's National Coach, undertook the maiden flight, as well as a number of subsequent tuning flights. The Falcon was certified for semi-aerobatic and cloud flying in March 1980.

The Falcon was based at the Buckminster Gliding Club. It was reported that Wright might offer kits for amateur construction, but it does not seem to have eventuated.

== Specifications ==
Data from Jane's All The World's Aircraft 1980-81

General characteristics

- Crew: 1
- Length: 19 ft 6 in (5.94 m)
- Wingspan: 49 ft 3 in (15.0 m)
- Height: 3 ft 4 in (1.02 m)
- Wing area: 94.3 sq ft (8.76 m^{2})
- Aspect ratio: 25.7
- Empty weight: 525 lb (238 kg) equipped
- Max takeoff weight: 800 lb (363 kg)

Performance

- Maximum speed: 155 mph (249 km/h, 135 kn) (smooth air)
- Stall speed: 46.5 mph (74.8 km/h, 40.4 kn)
- g limits: +12/-8
- Maximum glide ratio: best 39:1 at 55 mph
- Rate of sink: 120 ft/min (0.61 m/s) minimum at 53 mph (85 km/h)
- Wing loading: 8.48 lb/sq ft (41.4 kg/m^{2})
