= Wright Township, Michigan =

Wright Township is the name of 2 townships in the U.S. state of Michigan:

- Wright Township, Hillsdale County, Michigan
- Wright Township, Ottawa County, Michigan

See also

- Wright Township (disambiguation)
