= Viejas =

Viejas may refer to:

- Viejas Group of Capitan Grande Band of Mission Indians, a federally recognized Native American tribe
  - Viejas Casino, Alpine, California, United States, a hotel-casino owned by the tribe
- Viejas Mountain, California
- Viejas Valley, California
- Viejas Arena, a sports and music venue on the San Diego State University campus

== See also ==
- Vieja, a genus of fish
- La Vieja River, Colombia
- Mission Vieja, the first Spanish mission in the San Gabriel Valley, California
