= Judge Wright =

Judge Wright may refer to:

- Caleb Merrill Wright (1908–2001), judge of the United States District Court for the District of Delaware
- Eugene Allen Wright (1913–2002), judge of the United States Court of Appeals for the Ninth Circuit
- Francis Marion Wright (1844–1917), judge of the United States District Court for the Eastern District of Illinois
- J. Skelly Wright (1911–1988), judge of the United States Court of Appeals for the District of Columbia Circuit
- Lawrence A. Wright (1927–2000), judge of the United States Tax Court
- Otis D. Wright II (born 1944), judge of the United States District Court for the Central District of California
- Scott Olin Wright (1923–2016), judge of the United States District Court for the Western District of Missouri
- Susan Webber Wright (born 1948), judge of the United States District Court for the Eastern District of Arkansas
- Wilhelmina Wright (born 1964), judge of the United States District Court for the District of Minnesota

== See also ==
- Justice Wright (disambiguation)
