= Wright brothers (disambiguation) =

The Wright brothers were American inventors of the airplane, Orville (1871–1948) and Wilbur Wright (1867–1912).

Wright brothers or The Wright brothers may also refer to:

== People ==
- Von Wright brothers, Finnish painters
  - Magnus von Wright (1805–1868)
  - Wilhelm von Wright (1810–1887)
  - Ferdinand von Wright (1822–1906)
- John and Christopher Wright, Gunpowder Plot conspirators
- Harry Wright and George Wright, baseball players
- Wright Brothers, a black freedman, one of the first settlers of Melbourne, Florida, US

== Places ==
- Dayton–Wright Brothers Airport, airport in Dayton, Ohio, USA
- Wright Brothers National Memorial, Kill Devil Hills, North Carolina, USA; the place where the Wrights first flew
- Wright Brothers Field, Jezero Crater, Mars; the place where Ingenuity Mars drone helicopter first flew

== Other uses ==
- The Wright Brothers (book), 2015 non-fiction book by David McCullough
- The Wright Brothers (film), 1971 telefilm
- Wright Brothers Memorial Trophy, for public service in aviation in the United States
- Wright Brothers Medal for contributions to aerospace
- Wright Brothers Band, an Indiana-based music group, formed in 1972

== See also ==
- Wright (disambiguation)
