= Wrought =

Wrought is the archaic form of "worked," the more commonly used past tense and past participle of work.

Wrought may refer to:

- Metalworking, working with metals to create parts, assemblies, or structures
- Wrought iron, iron with a very low carbon content that has been wrought (hammered) by hand

== See also ==
- Wright (disambiguation)
