= Alpine, California =

- Census-designated place
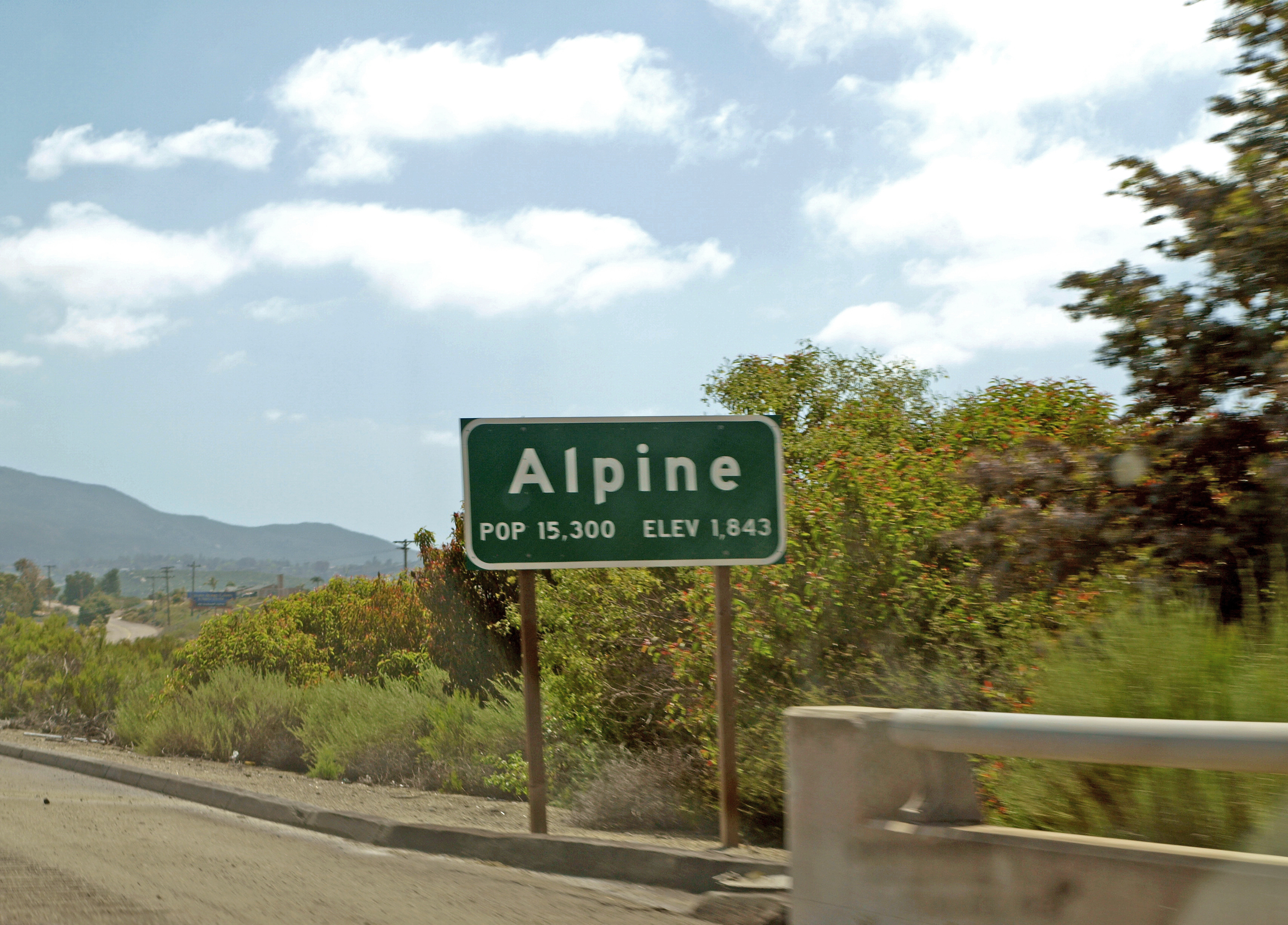
- Alpine's town sign at its western border, as seen from I-8
- Interactive map of Alpine, California
- Location in California Location in the United States
- Coordinates: 32°50′4″N 116°46′14″W
- Country: United States
- State: California
- County: San Diego

Area
  - Total: 26.79 sq mi (69.38 km^{2})
  - Land: 26.78 sq mi (69.37 km^{2})
  - Water: 0 sq mi (0.00 km^{2}) 0.01%
- Elevation: 1,834 ft (559 m)

Population (2020)
  - Total: 14,696
  - Density: 548.7/sq mi (211.8/km^{2})
- Time zone: UTC-8 (PST)
  - Summer (DST): UTC-7 (PDT)
- ZIP Codes: 91901, 91903
- Area code: 619, 858
- FIPS code: 06-01192
- GNIS ID: 1660247

Alpine is a census-designated place (CDP) in the Cuyamaca Mountains of San Diego County, California, United States. Alpine had a population of 14,696 at the 2020 census, up from 14,236 at the 2010 census and 15,755 in 2026. The town is largely surrounded by Cleveland National Forest and borders two reservations of the Kumeyaay, Viejas and Sycuan tribes, and the rural unincorporated areas around the city of El Cajon.

== History ==
Before its modern settlement, the area was part of the home of the Kumeyaay Indians, whose ancestors had lived here for possibly as long as 12,000 years.

The community's name was suggested by a resident in the 1880s who said that the environment reminded her of her native country of Switzerland.

The small commercial district along Alpine Boulevard has seen some suburban development in recent decades, and it is surrounded by large stretches of less densely populated rural areas that began in the late 19th and early 20th centuries. Horse ranches and small farms are still common, along with open chaparral hillsides and riparian canyons.

In 2003, the Cedar Fire ravaged the Alpine area.

== Geography ==
Alpine sits on both sides of Interstate 8 at the eastern extent of the California coastal region and the western extent of the Peninsular Ranges, about 30 miles (48 km) east of downtown San Diego, at an elevation of about 2,000 feet (610 m).

The location of Alpine is not precisely defined since it is an unincorporated area. According to the United States Geological Survey, it is at 32°50′6″N 116°45′59″W (32.8350521, -116.7664109), which is near the intersection of Alpine Boulevard and Tavern Road. That is approximately where most maps place Alpine. Kumeyaay tribes are indigenous to the area, and the Ewiiaapaayp Band and Viejas Band of Kumeyaay Indians both have headquarters in Alpine.

According to the United States Census Bureau, it is at 32°50′4″N 116°46′14″W (32.834563, -116.770615), which is approximately 1,200 feet (370 m) west of the USGS location. According to the United States Census Bureau, the CDP has a total area of 26.8 square miles (69 km^{2}), 99.99% land and 0.01% water.

Viejas Mountain is the highest peak in the area, at 4,189 feet (1,277 m). Wright's Field is a nature reserve located in Alpine.

=== Climate ===
According to the Köppen Climate Classification system, Alpine has a warm-summer Mediterranean climate, abbreviated "Csa" on climate maps. Summers are warm and dry, and winters are cool with moderate precipitation. Temperatures are more extreme than coastal San Diego, similar to nearby El Cajon and Ramona, and less extreme than the nearby mountain and desert regions, such as Julian.

Rainfall averages 16.05 inches (408 mm) per year, falling mostly from November to March, with numerous microclimates and annual variation. Rainfall amounts can vary greatly from month to month, or from year to year.

Average January temperatures range from the low 60s in the day to the low 40s at night. Average July temperatures range from upper 80s to the low 90s in the day to the low 60s at night. Highs of over 105 °F (41 °C) in the summer and lows of under 35 °F (2 °C) in the winter are occasional, particularly in the northern section of Alpine, on the slopes of Viejas Mountain.

Snowfall is very rare within the town of Alpine, with trace amounts falling once out of every two to three winters. However, light snow commonly falls each winter at elevations above 3,000 feet (910 m).

Climate data for Alpine, California (1991–2020 normals, extremes 1951–present)
Month	Jan	Feb	Mar	Apr	May	Jun	Jul	Aug	Sep	Oct	Nov	Dec	Year
Record high °F (°C)	89 (32)	90 (32)	95 (35)	103 (39)	104 (40)	109 (43)	112 (44)	108 (42)	113 (45)	103 (39)	96 (36)	90 (32)	113 (45)
Mean maximum °F (°C)	79.3 (26.3)	79.9 (26.6)	83.0 (28.3)	87.8 (31.0)	90.4 (32.4)	94.8 (34.9)	98.4 (36.9)	99.7 (37.6)	100.4 (38.0)	94.3 (34.6)	86.9 (30.5)	77.5 (25.3)	103.1 (39.5)
Mean daily maximum °F (°C)	63.9 (17.7)	64.2 (17.9)	67.2 (19.6)	70.7 (21.5)	74.4 (23.6)	81.2 (27.3)	86.7 (30.4)	88.9 (31.6)	85.9 (29.9)	78.3 (25.7)	70.6 (21.4)	63.1 (17.3)	74.6 (23.7)
Daily mean °F (°C)	53.2 (11.8)	53.3 (11.8)	55.8 (13.2)	58.8 (14.9)	62.6 (17.0)	67.8 (19.9)	73.4 (23.0)	75.5 (24.2)	73.1 (22.8)	66.2 (19.0)	59.1 (15.1)	52.3 (11.3)	62.6 (17.0)
Mean daily minimum °F (°C)	42.5 (5.8)	42.3 (5.7)	44.4 (6.9)	46.9 (8.3)	50.8 (10.4)	54.3 (12.4)	60.2 (15.7)	62.2 (16.8)	60.3 (15.7)	54.0 (12.2)	47.6 (8.7)	41.5 (5.3)	50.6 (10.3)
Mean minimum °F (°C)	33.9 (1.1)	34.4 (1.3)	36.2 (2.3)	39.0 (3.9)	44.1 (6.7)	47.9 (8.8)	51.9 (11.1)	53.2 (11.8)	50.3 (10.2)	45.5 (7.5)	37.9 (3.3)	33.2 (0.7)	29.8 (−1.2)
Record low °F (°C)	19 (−7)	20 (−7)	27 (−3)	30 (−1)	36 (2)	39 (4)	40 (4)	40 (4)	38 (3)	30 (−1)	28 (−2)	22 (−6)	19 (−7)
Average precipitation inches (mm)	3.21 (82)	3.65 (93)	2.73 (69)	1.18 (30)	0.57 (14)	0.13 (3.3)	0.10 (2.5)	0.12 (3.0)	0.25 (6.4)	0.59 (15)	1.48 (38)	2.04 (52)	16.05 (408)
Average snowfall inches (cm)	0.0 (0.0)	0.0 (0.0)	0.0 (0.0)	0.1 (0.25)	0.0 (0.0)	0.0 (0.0)	0.0 (0.0)	0.0 (0.0)	0.0 (0.0)	0.0 (0.0)	0.0 (0.0)	0.0 (0.0)	0.1 (0.25)
Average precipitation days (≥ 0.01 inch)	5.9	8.0	5.8	4.3	2.8	0.7	0.9	0.7	1.0	2.4	4.1	6.1	42.7
Average snowy days	0.0	0.0	0.0	0.1	0.0	0.0	0.0	0.0	0.0	0.0	0.0	0.0	0.1
Source: NOAA

== Demographics ==
Historical population
Census	Pop.	Note	%±
1960	1,044		—
1970	1,570		50.4%
1980	5,368		241.9%
1990	9,695		80.6%
2000	13,143		35.6%
2010	14,236		8.3%
2020	14,696		3.2%
U.S. Decennial Census; 1860–1870 1880-1890; 1900 1910 1920; 1930 1940 1950; 1960 1970 1980; 1990 2000 2010; 2020

Alpine first appeared as an unincorporated community in the 1960 U.S. census; and as a census-designated place in the 1980 United States census.

=== Racial and ethnic composition ===
Alpine CDP, California – Racial and ethnic composition Note: the US Census treats Hispanic/Latino as an ethnic category. This table excludes Latinos from the racial categories and assigns them to a separate category. Hispanics/Latinos may be of any race.
Race / Ethnicity (NH = Non-Hispanic)	Pop 2000	Pop 2010	Pop 2020	% 2000	% 2010	% 2020
White alone (NH)	11,074	11,183	10,364	84.26%	78.55%	70.52%
Black or African American alone (NH)	104	154	221	0.79%	1.08%	1.50%
Native American or Alaska Native alone (NH)	121	176	129	0.92%	1.24%	0.88%
Asian alone (NH)	256	298	306	1.95%	2.09%	2.08%
Native Hawaiian or Pacific Islander alone (NH)	23	33	49	0.17%	0.23%	0.33%
Other race alone (NH)	21	8	107	0.16%	0.06%	0.73%
Mixed race or Multiracial (NH)	201	303	832	1.53%	2.13%	5.66%
Hispanic or Latino (any race)	1,343	2,081	2,688	10.22%	14.62%	18.29%
Total	13,143	14,236	14,696	100.00%	100.00%	100.00%

=== 2020 census ===
As of the 2020 census, Alpine had a population of 14,696 and a population density of 548.6 inhabitants per square mile (211.8/km^{2}). The median age was 42.7 years. The age distribution was 21.6% under the age of 18, 7.5% aged 18 to 24, 23.2% aged 25 to 44, 28.8% aged 45 to 64, and 18.9% aged 65 or older. For every 100 females, there were 97.7 males, and for every 100 females age 18 and over, there were 96.6 males age 18 and over.

The racial makeup of Alpine was 76.0% White, 1.7% African American, 1.3% Native American, 2.2% Asian, 0.4% Pacific Islander, 6.6% from other races, and 11.8% from two or more races. Hispanic or Latino of any race were 18.3% of the population.

81.1% of residents lived in urban areas, while 18.9% lived in rural areas. The census reported that 99.0% of the population lived in households and 1.0% lived in non-institutionalized group quarters.

There were 5,299 households, of which 32.8% had children under the age of 18 living in them. Of all households, 59.2% were married-couple households, 6.1% were cohabiting couple households, 14.5% were households with a male householder and no spouse or partner present, and 20.2% were households with a female householder and no spouse or partner present. About 19.3% of all households were made up of individuals and 9.2% had someone living alone who was 65 years of age or older. The average household size was 2.75. There were 3,994 families (75.4% of all households).

There were 5,532 housing units at an average density of 206.5 units per square mile (79.7 units/km^{2}). Of these housing units, 95.8% were occupied and 4.2% were vacant. The homeowner vacancy rate was 1.0% and the rental vacancy rate was 3.7%. Of occupied units, 70.1% were owner-occupied and 29.9% were renter-occupied.

=== Demographic estimates ===
In 2023, the US Census Bureau estimated that 9.1% of the population were foreign-born. Of all people aged 5 or older, 81.7% spoke only English at home, 12.8% spoke Spanish, 2.7% spoke other Indo-European languages, 2.7% spoke Asian or Pacific Islander languages, and 0.1% spoke other languages. Of those aged 25 or older, 95.3% were high school graduates and 32.5% had a bachelor's degree.

=== Income and poverty ===
The median household income was $111,723, and the per capita income was $48,125. About 7.8% of families and 10.2% of the population were below the poverty line.

== Government ==
In the California State Legislature Alpine is in the 40th senatorial district, represented by Republican Brian Jones, and in the 75th Assembly district, represented by Republican Carl DeMaio.

In the United States House of Representatives, Alpine is in California's 48th congressional district, represented by Republican Darrell Issa.

== Education ==
Alpine is home to the Alpine Union School District, which manages Liberty Charter High School, Joan MacQueen Middle School, Boulder Oaks Elementary School, Shadow Hills Elementary School, and Creekside Early Learning Center.

== Notable people ==
- Being as an Ocean, melodic hardcore band
- Trenton Brooks, former Major League Baseball first baseman for the San Diego Padres
- Sheldon Creed, off-road racing driver and NASCAR driver
- Marcus Giles, former Major League Baseball second baseman
- Mark Grant, former Major League Baseball pitcher and San Diego Padres announcer
- Duncan D. Hunter, former United States Representative
- Duncan L. Hunter, former United States Representative
- Kyle Strait, Mountain Biker and trail builder
- Alex Vesia, current Major League Baseball pitcher for the Los Angeles Dodgers.
- Cole Whitt, NASCAR driver
