= The Wrights =

The Wrights may refer to:

- The Wrights (Australian band)
- The Wrights (country duo)
