= Piccard Mons =

Mountain on Pluto

- Feature type: Mountain, cryovolcano
- Location: Tombaugh Regio, Pluto
- Coordinates: 35.26°S 176.79°E
- Diameter: ~257 km (160 mi)
- Peak: 6 ± 1 km (3.7 ± 0.62 mi) (base to crest)
- Discoverer: New Horizons
- Eponym: Auguste Piccard

Piccard Mons is a large, roughly circular mountain and likely cryovolcano on the dwarf planet Pluto. Discovered by the New Horizons spacecraft in 2015, it is located southeast of Wright Mons within the Tombaugh Regio, adjacent to the Safronov Regio and Elcano Montes.

== Discovery and naming ==
On 14 July 2015, the New Horizons spacecraft conducted a flyby of the Pluto and its system of moons, resolving surface features on Pluto for the first time. Piccard Mons was soon after informally named by the New Horizons team after Swiss balloonist and physicist Auguste Piccard. On 30 May 2019, Piccard Mons was approved as the official name of the feature by the International Astronomical Union (IAU). Piccard Mons is believed to be the tallest cryovolcano on Pluto with an estimated height of 7 km (4.2 mi)

=== Challenges ===
By the time the New Horizons spacecraft was conducting its highest-resolution observations, the mountain was in darkness, having rotated past Pluto's terminator. Although some images were able to be taken past the line of darkness using sunlight reflected by Pluto's atmospheric haze layers, much less can be told about it than neighboring sunlit regions.

== Geography ==
Piccard Mons is at one of the southernmost points on Pluto. It is located in the southeastern part of the Tombaugh Regio and is west of the Safronov Regio. It is to the southeast of the Wright Mons and Hyecho Palus.

== Structure and geology ==
Piccard Mons is not made of rock like many other volcanoes in the Solar System, but a combination of ammonia, methane, carbon monoxide, ice, and nitrogen, all in solid form. Additionally, it is believed that Piccard Mons is made up of additional materials that are stronger than N_{2} ice.

Near Piccard Mons and the surrounding area, there is a hummocky terrain which means that there are consistent hills in the area. Very little is known about these hilly areas, but they do not seem to have been formed by erosion or continuous melting and freezing.

=== Cryovolcanism ===
It is believed that Piccard Mons is an effusive cryovolcano rather than explosive. This means that there was a low-viscosity fluid known as cryomagma that flowed down the mountain.

Before the discovery of Piccard Mons, it was believed that Pluto didn't have enough residual heat to cause volcanic eruptions, but with the evidence of the volcano having recently erupted, it is believed that there may have been enough radioactive material in the core of Pluto to cause such an eruption.

== See also ==
- List of geological features on Pluto
- List of tallest mountains in the Solar System
