= Wright Mons =

Mountain on Pluto

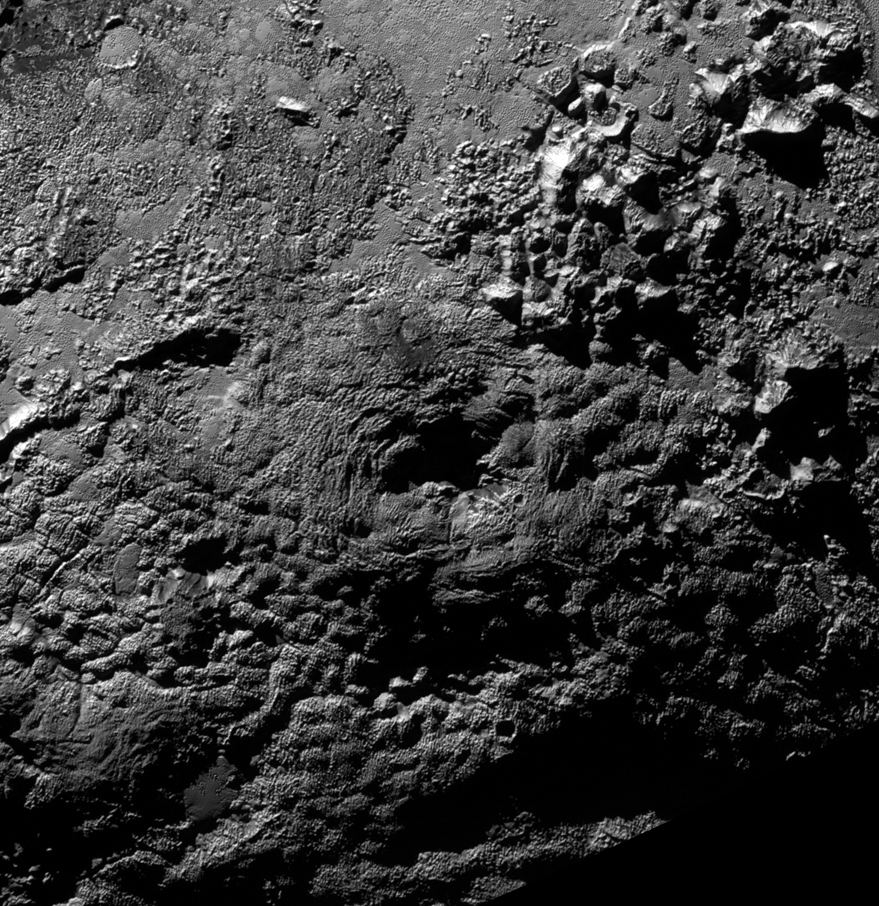
- Wright Mons and its surroundings
- Feature type: Mountain, cryovolcano
- Location: Hyecho Palus, Tombaugh Regio, Pluto
- Coordinates: 21.36°S 173.24°E
- Diameter: ~150 km (93.2 mi)
- Peak: 4.7 ± 1 km (2.9 ± 0.62 mi) (base to crest)
- Discoverer: New Horizons
- Eponym: Wright brothers

Wright Mons is a large, roughly circular mountain and likely cryovolcano on the dwarf planet Pluto. Discovered by the New Horizons spacecraft in 2015, it is located southwest of Sputnik Planitia within Hyecho Palus, adjacent to the Tenzing Montes and Belton Regio. A relatively young geological feature, Wright Mons has attracted attention as one of the most apparent examples of recent geological activity on Pluto and borders numerous other similarly young features. Numerous semi-regular hills surround and partially construct the flanks of Wright Mons. Their nature remains unexplained, with few, if any, direct analogs elsewhere in the Solar System.

== Discovery and naming ==
On 14 July 2015, the New Horizons spacecraft conducted a flyby of the Pluto system, resolving surface features on Pluto for the first time. Wright Mons was soon after informally named by the New Horizons team after American aviation pioneers Orville and Wilbur Wright. On 30 May 2019, Wright Mons was approved as the official name of the feature by the International Astronomical Union (IAU).

== Geography ==
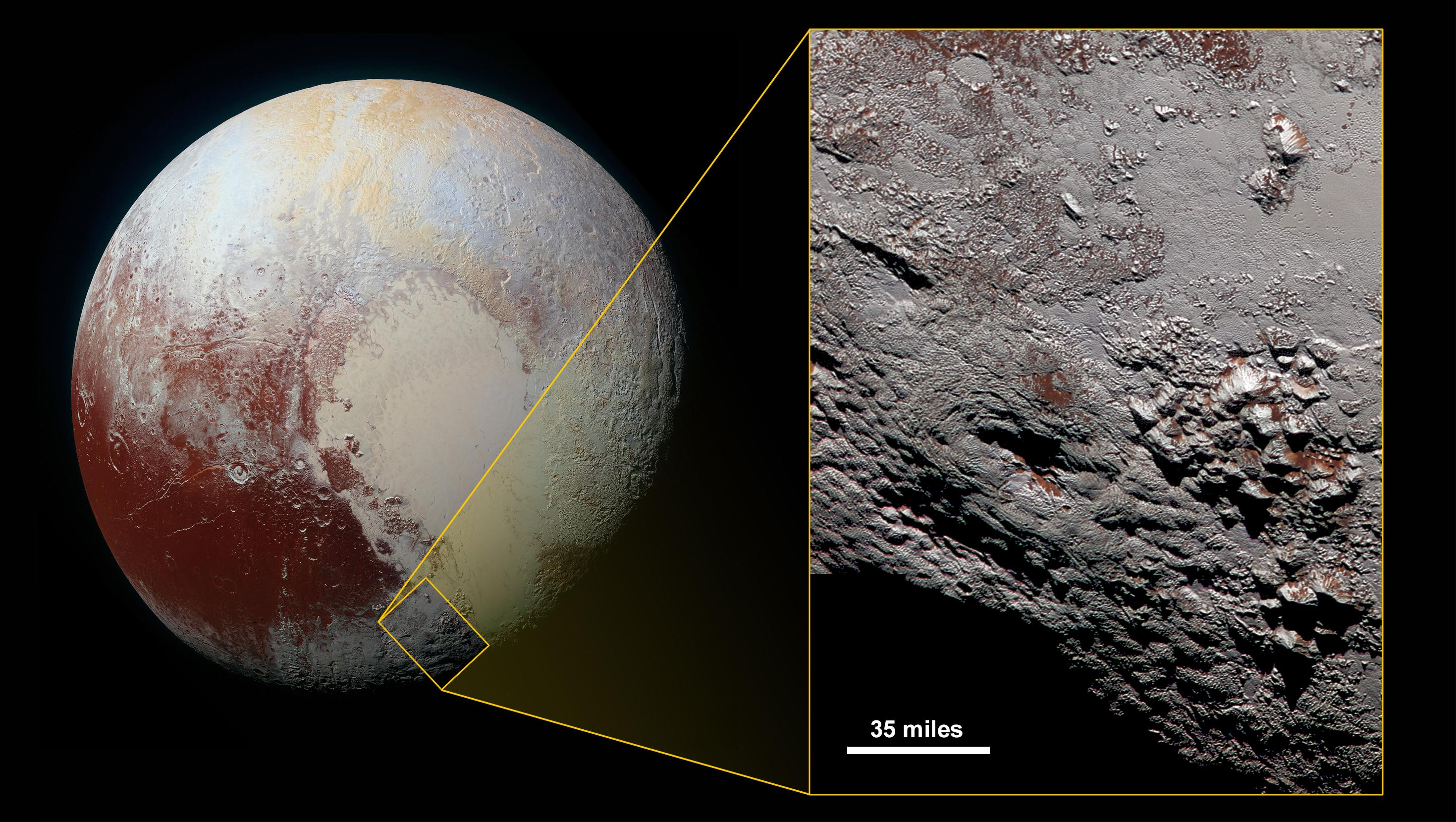
An enhanced-color view of Pluto with Wright Mons's location marked

Wright Mons is located in Pluto's southern hemisphere within the roughly 400 by 700 kilometer-wide (250 by 435 miles-wide) Hyecho Palus, a walled low-lying plain and one of the lowest-altitude regions on Pluto. Situated between two major features, Sputnik Planitia to the northeast and Belton Regio to the west, Wright Mons directly borders the tallest blocks of the Tenzing Montes directly to its northeast. The region around Wright Mons and Hyecho Palus is heavily tectonized, appearing to participate in the massive ridge-trough system (RTS), a tectonic complex that is Pluto's oldest large-scale feature identified and cuts a north–south great circle around most of Pluto's observed regions. (Note: The RTS is several hundreds of kilometers wide and roughly traces the 155° meridian, grazing and partially intersecting the western edge of the Sputnik Planitia basin. The RTS appears to terminate near Pluto's north pole, whilst it continues beyond the imaged regions to the south.)

== Structure and geology ==
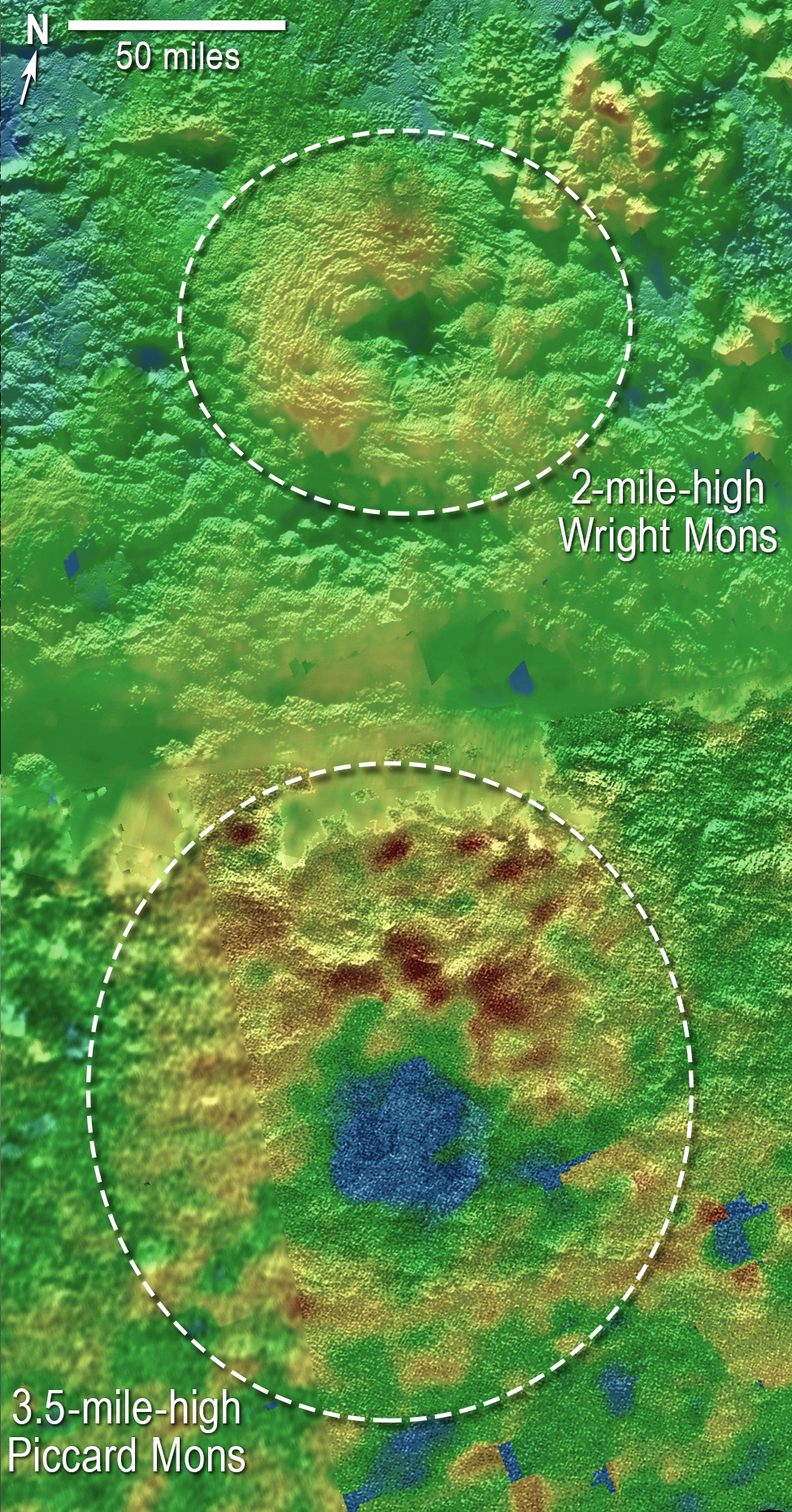
Topography map of Wright Mons (top) and Piccard Mons (bottom)

Wright Mons's edifice is roughly annular in shape, at approximately 150 kilometers (93 mi) in diameter, and is likely composed primarily of water ice. It stands roughly 3.5–4.7 km (2.2–2.9 mi) above Hyecho Palus with a ~45 km (28 mi) wide central depression that stretches some 3.5–4.5 km (2.2–2.8 mi) below Wright Mons's summit. Two subsidiary peaks mark the summit rim, one roughly circular mound north of the central depression and another to the southwest.

Wright Mons's relatively shallow flanks are largely dominated by a dense network of hummocks, or hills, each roughly 10 to 15 kilometers (6.2 to 9.3 mi) in diameter and 200 to 600 meters (656 to 1,970 ft) high. The approximately conical central depression has a roughly flat floor which reaches nearly, if not as low as the plains surrounding Wright Mons. The central depression is ringed by concentric topographical fabric, or small textured ridges, possibly originating from a summit collapse or from superficial emplacement, and a series of radial trenches mark the central depression wall. Wright Mons's eastern flank is intersected by a north–south fault which displaces the eastern section downwards relative to the western section, resulting in a height asymmetry of the mountain. Only one probable impact crater has been identified on Wright Mons's edifice, indicating that Wright Mons is likely younger than one billion years old.

=== Hummocky terrain ===
Wright Mons is surrounded by an unusual type of terrain informally termed hummocky terrain, characterized by semi-regular mounds and hills of unclear origin. Much of Hyecho Palus is covered by hummocky terrain, but the hummocky terrain is most apparent adjacent to and partially on Wright Mons's edifice, though it appears to fade to rougher terrain to the south around neighboring Piccard Mons. The hummocky terrain may be related to the formation and geological history of Wright Mons and other similar nearby mountains, and has been compared to the funiscular terrain on the south pole of Saturn's moon Enceladus.

=== Cryovolcanism ===
Soon after Wright Mons's discovery, its young surface and resemblance to terrestrial volcanoes prompted speculation that it could be a cryovolcanic structure, formed from erupted volatile material termed cryolava. However, its unusual structure has made it difficult to determine how Wright Mons formed, and it remains controversial as to what eruptive processes created Wright Mons. The resemblance of the central pit to summit calderas led to early speculation that Wright Mons may have been constructed in a similar manner to individual large volcanoes of the inner planets, erupting cryolava from a single central vent. Wright Mons has also been compared to terrestrial mud volcanoes, with a hypothesis proposing that subsurface mud-like slurry could be forced up due to density differences in seasonally-deposited layers on Pluto's surface. Models of this type of cryovolcanism construct a Wright Mons-sized structure within 1–10 million years. The unusual hummocks have been proposed as forming from rapidly cooled cryolava, similar to pillow lava, or from compression in a manner similar to pāhoehoe lava. The sinuous radial trenches in Wright Mons's central depression appear to follow the steepest topographical gradient, and as such have been noted as potential cryolava flow channels, but this identification remains uncertain.

However, Wright Mons's edifice lacks any identifiable lateral flow features or fallout from any hypothetical explosive eruptions. The numerous hummocks that rise on Wright Mons's flanks have been noted as appearing similar to overlapping dacite and andesite lava domes on Earth, and the two subsidiary summits appear to have been emplaced superficially on Wright Mons's edifice. A more recent hypothesis, proposed by a team of planetary scientists in 2022, suggests that a sequence of dome-forming eruptions merged to form the edifice of Wright Mons and that the caldera-like depression is coincidental, with the eruptions possibly occurring in multiple episodes. Nearby Coleman Mons has been proposed as an analogous, isolated example of the tentative domes which may construct Wright Mons's edifice.

Wright Mons is a part of a putative cryovolcanic field, bordering two other major probable cryovolcanic structures, Piccard Mons and Coleman Mons. Hyecho Palus is marked by other irregular depressions, some of which are located atop smaller topographical edifices; as a result, Hyecho Palus is interpreted by some planetary geologists as a cryovolcanic plain or province.

== See also ==
- Geology of Pluto – Geologic structure and composition of Pluto
- Doom Mons – Mountain on Titan
