= Wright's Field in Alpine =

American nature reserve

Coordinates: 32.82545°N 116.77219°W

Wright's Field in Alpine is a 230-acre nature reserve in Alpine, California. The property was purchased in 1990 by Back Country Land Trust.

The ecosystems found in Wright's Field include native grassland, Engelmann oak woodland, riparian (streamside) habitat, vernal pools, and coastal sage scrub/chaparral. Native and nonnative plants found in Wright's Field include sunflowers, buckwheat, sugarbush, canchalagua, wallflowers and Engelmann oak trees among others.
