= Wright Field (writer) =

American writer

Wright Field was an American writer.

== Biography ==
Wright Field was a native of Catlettsburg, Kentucky, the daughter of Lafayette Wright and Mary Luvenia Clark.

She was a writer. She contributed many short stories to Occult Digest, Catholic World, Chicago Ledger, and many more. Several of her poems appeared in Literary Digest and different anthologies. She wrote many juvenile stories and articles of metaphysical trend.

Wright Field lived in Ohio, Oklahoma, Texas, Arkansas, Kansas, Nebraska, Idaho and Oregon, and moved to Washington in 1905. She married Andrew J. Field (1867–1944) and had three children Pearl, Charles, Norma. She lived at 1201 McKinley Avenue, Yakima, Washington.
