= Justice Wright =

Justice Wright may refer to:

- Archibald Wright (judge) (1809–1884), associate justice of the Tennessee Supreme Court
- Benjamin D. Wright (1799–1874), associate justice of the Florida Supreme Court
- Charles T. Wright (1911–1980), associate justice of the Washington Supreme Court
- Daniel Thew Wright (1864–1943), associate justice of the Supreme Court of the District of Columbia
- Daniel Thew Wright Sr. (1825–1912), member of the Ohio Supreme Court Commission
- Donald Wright (1907–1985), chief justice of the Supreme Court of California
- George G. Wright (1820–1896), associate justice of the Iowa Supreme Court
- J. Craig Wright (1929–2010), associate justice of the Ohio Supreme Court
- John C. Wright (Ohio politician) (1783–1861), associate justice of the Ohio Supreme Court
- John F. Wright (1945–2018), associate justice of the Nebraska Supreme Court
- John Vines Wright (1828–1908), associate justice of the Tennessee Supreme Court
- Jonathan Jasper Wright (1840–1885), associate justice of the South Carolina Supreme Court
- Lance Wright (fl. 2000s), justice of the Court of Arbitration of New South Wales
- Robert Samuel Wright (1839–1904), BCL, justice of the High Court of Justice (Queen's Bench Division)
- Robert Wright (judge, died 1689), chief justice of the King's Bench of England
- Robert Wright (South Carolina judge) (1666–1739), chief justice of South Carolina from 1725
- Samuel T. Wright III (born 1955), associate justice of the Kentucky Supreme Court
- Solomon Wright (fl. 1770s–1790s), associate justice of the Maryland Court of Appeals
- Wilhelmina Wright (born 1964), associate justice of the Minnesota Supreme Court
- William B. Wright (1806–1868), chief judge of the New York Court of Appeals

== See also ==
- Judge Wright (disambiguation)
