= Viejas Mountain =

Mountain in San Diego County in the U.S. state of California

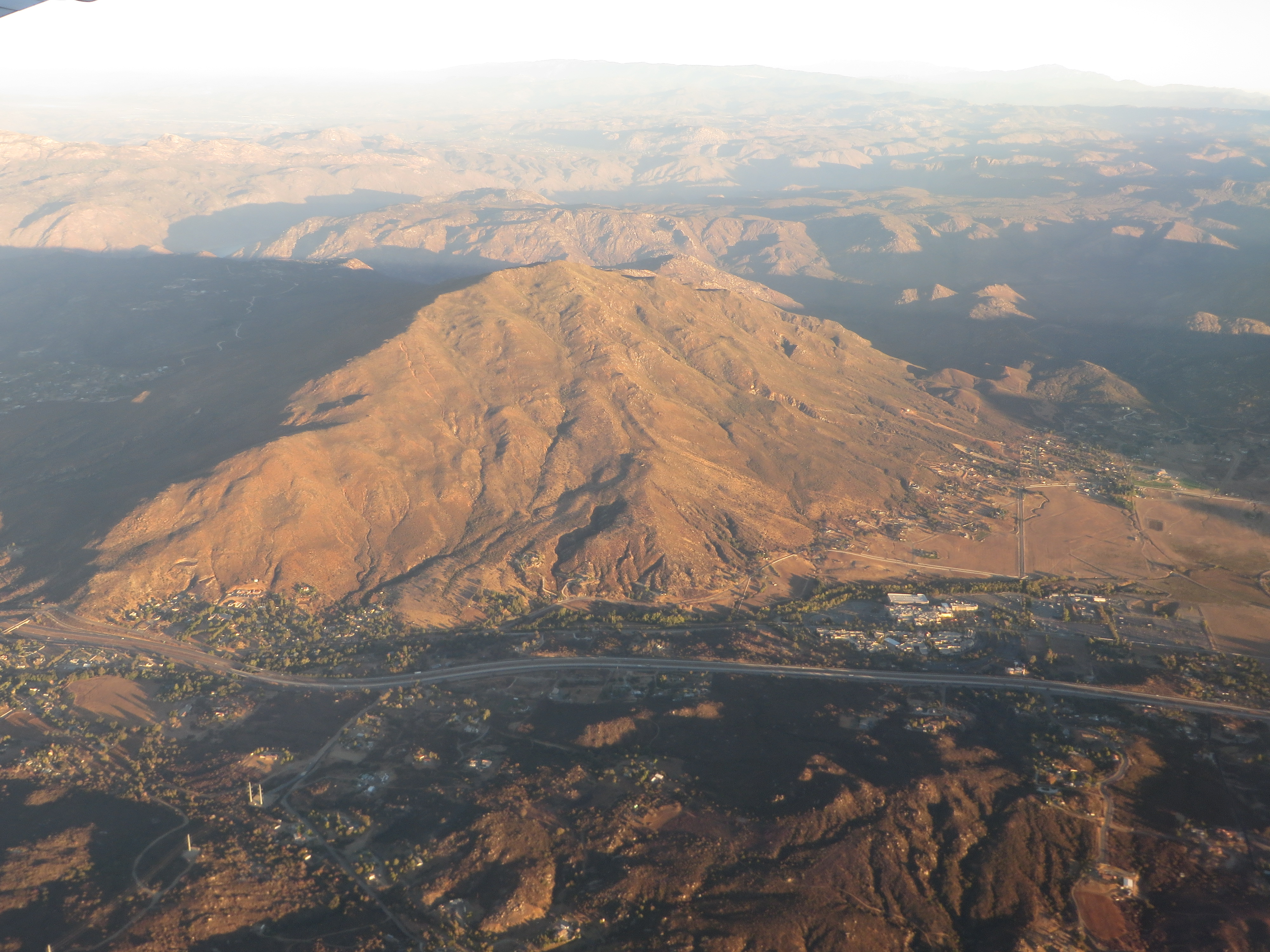

Highest point
- Elevation: 4,189 ft (1,277 m) NAVD 88
- Prominence: 1,627 ft (496 m)
- Listing: San Diego Peak list
- Coordinates: 32°51′40″N 116°43′33″W

Geography
- Location within California
- Location: San Diego County, California, US
- Topo map: USGS Viejas Mountain

Viejas Mountain is a mountain in San Diego County, California. At 4,189 feet (1,277 m), Viejas Mountain is the 48th tallest peak in San Diego County. The mountain can be seen from parts of metropolitan San Diego. The summit is about 3 miles (5 km) northeast of the community of Alpine in Cleveland National Forest.
