= Wright Township =

Wright Township may refer to:

== In Canada ==
- Wright Township, in Cochrane District, Ontario

== In the United States ==
=== Indiana ===
- Wright Township, Greene County, Indiana

=== Iowa ===
- Wright Township, Pottawattamie County, Iowa
- Wright Township, Wayne County, Iowa

=== Michigan ===
- Wright Township, Hillsdale County, Michigan
- Wright Township, Ottawa County, Michigan

=== Minnesota ===
- Wright Township, Marshall County, Minnesota

=== North Dakota ===
- Wright Township, Dickey County, North Dakota

=== Oklahoma ===
- Wright Township, Jefferson County, Oklahoma

=== Pennsylvania ===
- Wright Township, Pennsylvania

=== South Dakota ===
- Wright Township, Tripp County, South Dakota, in Tripp County, South Dakota

== See also ==
- Wright (disambiguation)
