= Write (disambiguation) =

Writing is a medium of human communication that represents language and emotion through the inscription or recording of signs and symbols.

Writing may also refer to:

- The work of an author
- Communication
- Musical composition
- Screenwriting
- Creative writing
- Writing: The Story of Alphabets and Scripts, a 1987 illustrated book by Georges Jean

== Write ==
- write (system call), a system call that implements low-level file writing operations
- write (Unix), a Unix shell command that allows the user to send messages to other users
- Write, to treat or alter digital data during input/output
- pfs:Write, an early word processor for IBM PCs of the late 1980s
- Microsoft Write, an early Microsoft Windows word processor
