= Wright MPA Mk 1 =

1970s British human-powered aircraft

- Front quarter view of the MPA Mk 1, in its first configuration

General information
- Type: Human-powered aircraft
- National origin: United Kingdom
- Manufacturer: Peter Wright
- Number built: 1

History
- First flight: 1972

The Wright MPA Mk 1 was the first of two human-powered aircraft designed and built by Peter Wright, an engineer from Melton Mowbray, England.

== Background ==
Design of the aircraft began in October 1969, with construction itself beginning mid-1971. It was completed by February 1972, with that taking 500 hours. Wright's approach was to reduce the aircraft's weight and its construction time by minimising the amount of materials used to construct the aircraft.

The aircraft was a mid-wing monoplane. The pilot sat in a semi-recumbent position, and powered a rear-mounted 2-bladed propeller via bicycle pedals driving a bicycle chain and driveshaft transmission. The framework for the pilot support and the transmission was made from mild steel tubing, with the remainder of the aircraft being constructed from expanded polystyrene, plastics, balsa, with carbon fibre being used to reinforce the structure. Compared to other human-powered aircraft of the era, the MPA Mk 1 had a very large wing area, with a very low wing loading. This affected the number of opportunities available to undertake flights. The aircraft was fitted with a tricycle undercarriage, with the front wheel being powered, and two small trailing wheels castering. The empennage was of a cruciform type, with an all-flying elevator and a conventional fin and rudder. There was no lateral control.

The first flight was made at Langar airfield near Nottingham, in February 1972, when it covered 120 yards (110 metres) at an altitude of 1 ft (0.3 metres). When initially tested, the pilot had rudder control only, with the elevator being fixed, and the undercarriage adjusted to give the aircraft the correct incidence for take-off. Eventually, flights of up to 300 yards (275 metres) were made. In 1975, it was reported that the aircraft was in store, pending the availability of a suitable flying site.

Wright went onto design and produce a second human-powered aircraft, the Micron.

== Specifications ==
Data from Jane's all the world's aircraft 1973-74

General characteristics

- Crew: 1
- Length: 20 ft (6.1 m)
- Wingspan: 71 ft (22 m)
- Height: 8 ft 6 in (2.59 m)
- Wing area: 486 sq ft (45.2 m^{2})
- Aspect ratio: 10.3
- Airfoil: Wortmann FX-08-S-176
- Empty weight: 95 lb (43 kg)
- Gross weight: 225 lb (102 kg)
- Propellers: 2-bladed, 7 ft (2.1 m) diameter

Performance

- Maximum speed: 15 mph (24 km/h, 13 kn)
- Cruise speed: 14 mph (23 km/h, 12 kn)
- Stall speed: 13 mph (21 km/h, 11 kn)
- Wing loading: 0.46 lb/sq ft (2.2 kg/m^{2})

== See also ==
Aircraft of comparable role, configuration, and era

- HMPAC Puffin
- Malliga 1
- MacCready Gossamer Albatross
- MacCready Gossamer Condor
- Paxton man-powered aircraft
- Weybridge Mercury
- Wright Micron

Related lists

- List of Human-powered aircraft
