= Wright Micron =

1970s British human-powered aircraft

Wright Micro
- Peter Wright holding a scale model of the Micron

General information
- Type: Human-powered aircraft
- National origin: United Kingdom
- Manufacturer: Peter Wright
- Number built: 1

The Micron was the second of two human-powered aircraft designed and built by Peter Wright, an engineer from Melton Mowbray, England.

Wright had previously designed and built the Wright MPA Mk 1, which first flew in 1972. The low wing loading of that design affected the flight opportunities which could be made. The design of his second human-powered aircraft, the Micron, began in 1974 with the intent that it be robust and practical; to this end, it had a relatively high wing loading, thereby increasing flight opportunities. It was also intended to be easily assembled and transportable in a glider trailer.

The Micron was of conventional configuration. It was a low-wing monoplane, with a very streamlined fuselage and a V-tail empennage. The pilot sat in a recumbent position, pedalling a set of bicycle pedals, and powering a pusher propeller mounted on a pylon located near the front of the fuselage. Power transmission was by a cable/roller drive. The craft made extensive use of plastics, expanded polystyrene, and carbon fibre. The fuselage, tail, and upper wing surfaces were all produced using moulds.

The craft was completed by February 1976, and involved 200 hours of construction time. A month later it was reported that the Micron was undergoing trials at RAF Cranwell, and was being hangared there alongside the Jupiter and Mercury human-powered aircraft. There is little information available regarding its flight testing, however Brian Spreckley writing in the April-May 1980 issue of Sailplane and Gliding stated that it had flown, though no other details were given.

Peter Wright later built a single seat Standard Class glider, the Wright Falcon, which is similar in appearance to the Micron.

== Specifications ==
Data from AeroModeller, Man-Powered Flight, and Human Powered Flight

General characteristics

- Crew: 1
- Wingspan: 76 ft (23 m)
- Wing area: 134 sq ft (12.4 m^{2})
- Aspect ratio: 40
- Propellers: 2-bladed, 9 ft (2.7 m) diameter

Performance

== See also ==
Aircraft of comparable role, configuration, and era

- HMPAC Puffin
- Malliga 1
- MacCready Gossamer Albatross
- MacCready Gossamer Condor
- Paxton man-powered aircraft
- Weybridge Mercury
- Wright MPA Mk 1

Related lists

- List of Human-powered aircraft
