= Weybridge Man Powered Aircraft =

General information
- Type: Single-seat man-powered aircraft
- National origin: United Kingdom
- Manufacturer: Weybridge Man Powered Aircraft Group
- Number built: 1

History
- First flight: 18 September 1971

The Weybridge Man Powered Aircraft (also known as Dumbo and later Mercury) is a British single-seat man-powered aircraft built and flown by members of the Weybridge Man Powered Aircraft Group.

== Development ==
The Weybridge Man Powered Aircraft Group was formed in late 1967 with members drawn from the British Aircraft Corporation factory and the local chapter of the Royal Aeronautical Society. Construction started in 1968 and the aircraft was assembled at Wisley and flown for the first time from Weybridge on 18 September 1971. The Weybridge MPA (which was named Dumbo) was flown by Christopher Lovell for a distance of 46 metres with a height reached of 3 ft (0.9m). Only two flights were made at Weybridge and the aircraft was passed to another group at RAF Cranwell who renamed it Mercury.

== Design ==
The aircraft is a low-wing cantilever monoplane with a fuselage made from aluminium alloy tubing with balsa frames and covered with Melinex. The wing has a single warren-girder main spar of aluminium alloy tubing with balsa ribs and, like the fuselage, covered with Melinex. The landing gear was a non-retractable tandem arrangement using bicycle wheels. The power is generated by the pilot in an enclosed cockpit using bicycle pedals driving a two-bladed balsa pusher propeller.

== Specifications ==
Data from Jane's All the World's Aircraft 1973-74

General characteristics

- Crew: 1
- Length: 21 ft 0 in (6.40 m)
- Wingspan: 120 ft 4 in (36.69 m)
- Height: 11 ft 6 in (3.51 m)
- Wing area: 485 sq ft (45.06 m^{2})
- Empty weight: 125 lb (56 kg)
- Gross weight: 280 lb (127 kg)

Performance

- Maximum speed: 16 mph (25.5 km/h, 14 kn)
- Stall speed: 11 mph (18 km/h, 9.6 kn)

== See also ==
Aircraft of comparable role, configuration, and era

- HMPAC Puffin
- Malliga 1
- Malliga 2
- Paxton man-powered aircraft
- Wright Micron
- Wright MPA Mk 1

Related lists

- List of human-powered aircraft
