= Paxton man-powered aircraft =

1970s British human-powered aircraft

General information
- Type: Human-powered aircraft
- National origin: United Kingdom
- Manufacturer: Tony Paxton
- Number built: 1

The Paxton man-powered aircraft was the project of architect Tony Paxton, to create a compact human-powered aircraft, suitable for sports flying.

It was a low-wing monoplane, but mounted on top of a tall undercarriage 6 ft (1.8 m) off the ground. The airframe was constructed of metal tubing, with extensive use of styrofoam in order to create the wing ribs and fuselage formers. The wings were of constant chord and made use of the thick-sectioned high-lift GU25-5(11)8 aerofoil. The wings were also wire braced, and fitted with tip plates at each wingtip. Control was very similar to that of the Weybridge Dumbo machine; the cruciform tail featured movable control surfaces on both fins and the tailplanes, with lateral control being achieved by rotating each wing, in its entirety, around the spar.

The pilot sat in the open air, in a reclined position, and powered a 2-bladed pusher propeller via a bevel-geared drive system.

Initial tests with the aircraft resulted in a failure of the drive system. A later attempt to tow the aircraft aloft ended when the craft tipped over forwards. According to the author Keith Sherwin, subsequent developments to the aircraft proved to be successful, implying that it had flown.

== Specifications ==
Data from Man-Powered Flight

General characteristics

- Crew: 1
- Wingspan: 51 ft (16 m)
- Wing area: 153 sq ft (14.2 m^{2})
- Airfoil: GU25-5(11)8
- Empty weight: 85 lb (39 kg)
- Gross weight: 220 lb (100 kg)
- Propellers: 2-bladed

Performance

== See also ==
Aircraft of comparable role, configuration, and era

- HMPAC Puffin
- Malliga 1
- MacCready Gossamer Albatross
- MacCready Gossamer Condor
- Goodhart Newbury Manflier
- Southend MPG Mayfly
- Weybridge Dumbo

Related lists

- List of Human-powered aircraft
