= Pedal =

A pedal (from the Latin pes pedis, "foot") is a lever designed to be operated by foot and may refer to:

== Computers and other equipment ==
- Footmouse, a foot-operated computer mouse
- In medical transcription, a pedal is used to control playback of voice dictations

== Geometry ==
- Pedal curve, a curve derived by construction from a given curve
- Pedal triangle, a triangle obtained by projecting a point onto the sides of a triangle

== Music ==
=== Albums ===
- Pedals (Rival Schools album)
- Pedals (Speak album)

=== Other music ===
- Bass drum pedal, a pedal used to play a bass drum while leaving the drummer's hands free to play other drums with drum sticks, hands, etc.
- Effects pedal, a pedal used commonly for electric guitars
- Pedal keyboard, a musical keyboard operated by the player's feet
- Pedal harp, a modern orchestral harp with pedals used to change the tuning of its strings
- Pedal point, a type of nonchord tone, usually in the bass
- Pedal tone, a fundamental tone played on brass instruments
- Piano pedals, typically three pedals used to soften, sustain, or selectively sustain notes played on a piano
- Pedal piano, a kind of piano that includes a pedalboard
- Player piano, a kind of piano which plays prerecorded music, some designs of which are driven by pedals
- The damper mechanism on a vibraphone, also known as a "pedal"

== Transportation ==
- Bicycle pedal, the part of a bicycle that the rider pushes with their foot to propel the vehicle
- Pedalo, a small boat, usually for recreation, propelled by one or more occupants using bicycle style pedals
- Automobile pedal, such as the accelerator, brake, and clutch, see car controls
- Pedals (The Nottingham Cycling Campaign), a cycling advocacy group in Nottingham, England
- Rudder pedal, to control yaw on an airplane

== Other uses ==
- Pedal bin, a container with a lid operated by a foot pedal
- Pedal bone or coffin bone, the last phalanx and most distal bone in the front and rear legs of horses, cattle, pigs, and other ruminants
- Pedals (bear)

== See also ==
- Pedal boat (disambiguation)
- Pedal Pusher (disambiguation)
- Peddle, to sell something by going from place to place
- Peddle (surname)
- Petal (disambiguation)
