= Pedal boat =

Pedal boat may refer to:

- Amphibious cycle, a pedal-powered vehicle capable of operation on both land and water
- Hydrocycle, a bicycle-like watercraft with pontoons or a hydrofoil for buoyancy, and pedals for propulsion
- Human-powered hydrofoil, a hydrofoil that can use pedals and various other means for propulsion
- Pedalo, or paddle boat, a human-powered watercraft that uses pedals to turn a paddle wheel

== See also ==
- Human-powered watercraft
