= Paddle boat =

Paddle boat may refer to:

- Paddle steamer or paddleboat, a boat propelled by a paddle wheel
- Pedalo, a boat propelled by pedalling with the feet
- A paddlecraft, i.e. a human-powered watercraft which is propelled using handheld paddles, such as a canoe or kayak
