= Decavitator =

Human-powered water transport vehicle

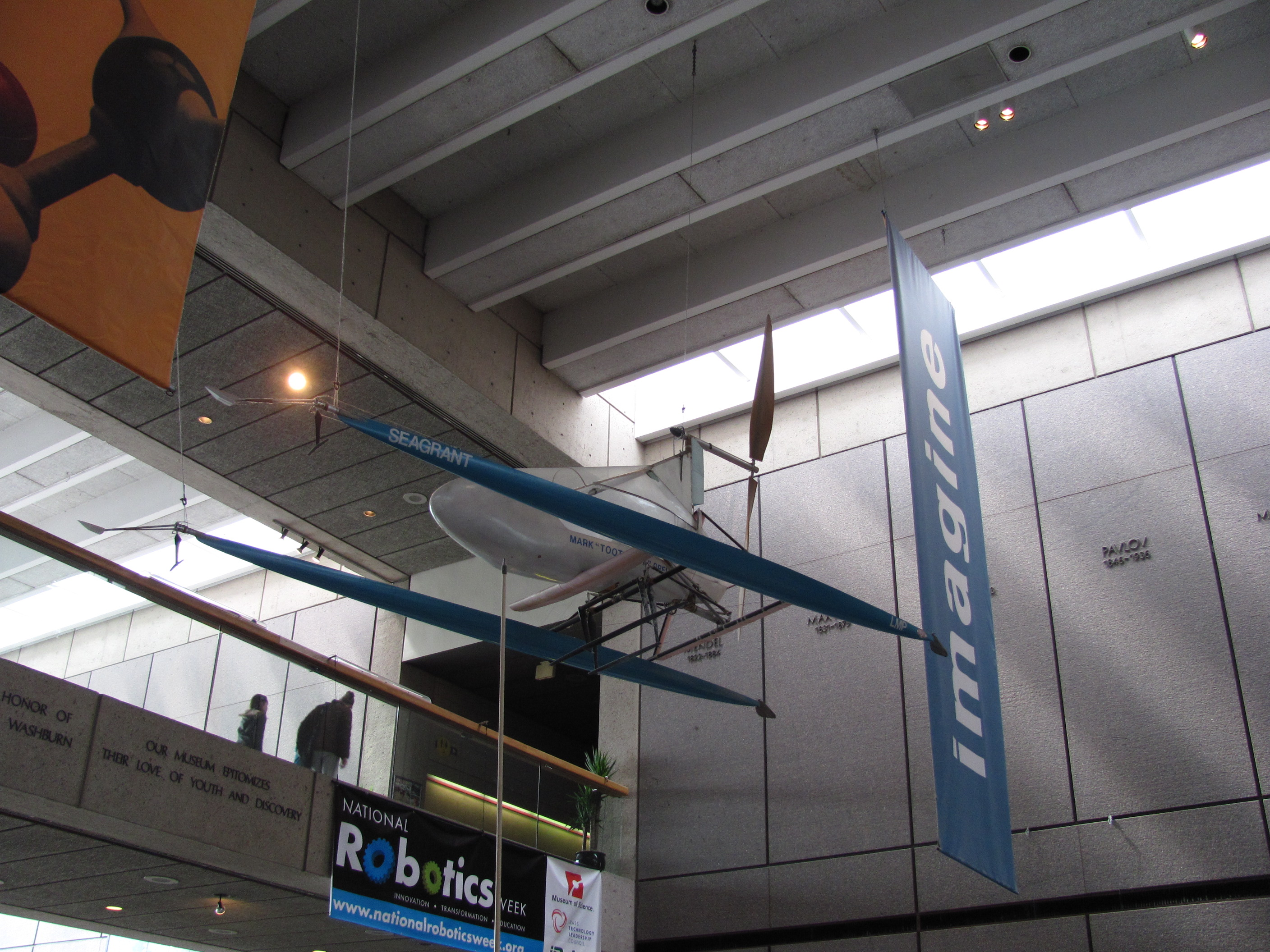
Decavitator

Decavitator is a human-powered hydrofoil equipped with pedals and an air propeller that was built by the Massachusetts Institute of Technology. It holds the human-powered speed record on water. The vehicle was displayed hanging in the entry lobby of the Museum of Science, Boston until 2015. It is currently in storage at MIT.

On 27 October 1991, Mark Drela set the world-record speed with Decavitator of 18.5 knots (21.3 mph; 34.3 km/h) over a 100-meter race course on the Charles River in Boston, Massachusetts. In the spring of 1993 the Decavitator team was awarded the DuPont prize for the team with the fastest speed on record as of 31 December 1992.

== See also ==
- Human-powered hydrofoil
- Human-powered watercraft
- Hydrocycle
- List of world records in rowing
- Pedalo
- Speed with Guy Martin
