= Petal (disambiguation) =

A petal is one member (or part) of the corolla of a flower.

Petal, Petals, or variants may also refer to:

== Entertainment ==
- Petal (band), a rock band from Scranton, Pennsylvania
- A Petal, a 1996 South Korean film
- Petals (TV series), 1989–1999 Australian children's TV series
- "Petals" (composition), composed by Kaija Saariaho in 1988
- "Petals" (Mariah Carey song), 1999
- "Petals", a song by Hole from Celebrity Skin, 1998
- Petal (album), 2026 studio album by Ariana Grande
  - "Petal" (song), the title track

== Other uses ==
- Petal, Mississippi, United States
- Petal Maps, an online map service based on data from OpenStreetMap
- Petal Search, a search engine, developed by Huawei
- Breast petal, a type of nipple shield
- In mathematics, portions of a topological space; see Rose (topology)

== See also ==
- Pedal (disambiguation)
- Peddle, to sell something by going from place to place
- Peddle (surname)
