= I Believe in Everything =

I Believe in Everything may refer to:

- I Believe in Everything (album), a 2011 album by Speak
- "I Believe in Everything" (song), a 1971 song by John Entwistle
- "I Believe in Everything", a 2012 song by Matchbox Twenty from North
