= Human-powered transport =

Transport of goods and/or people only using human muscles

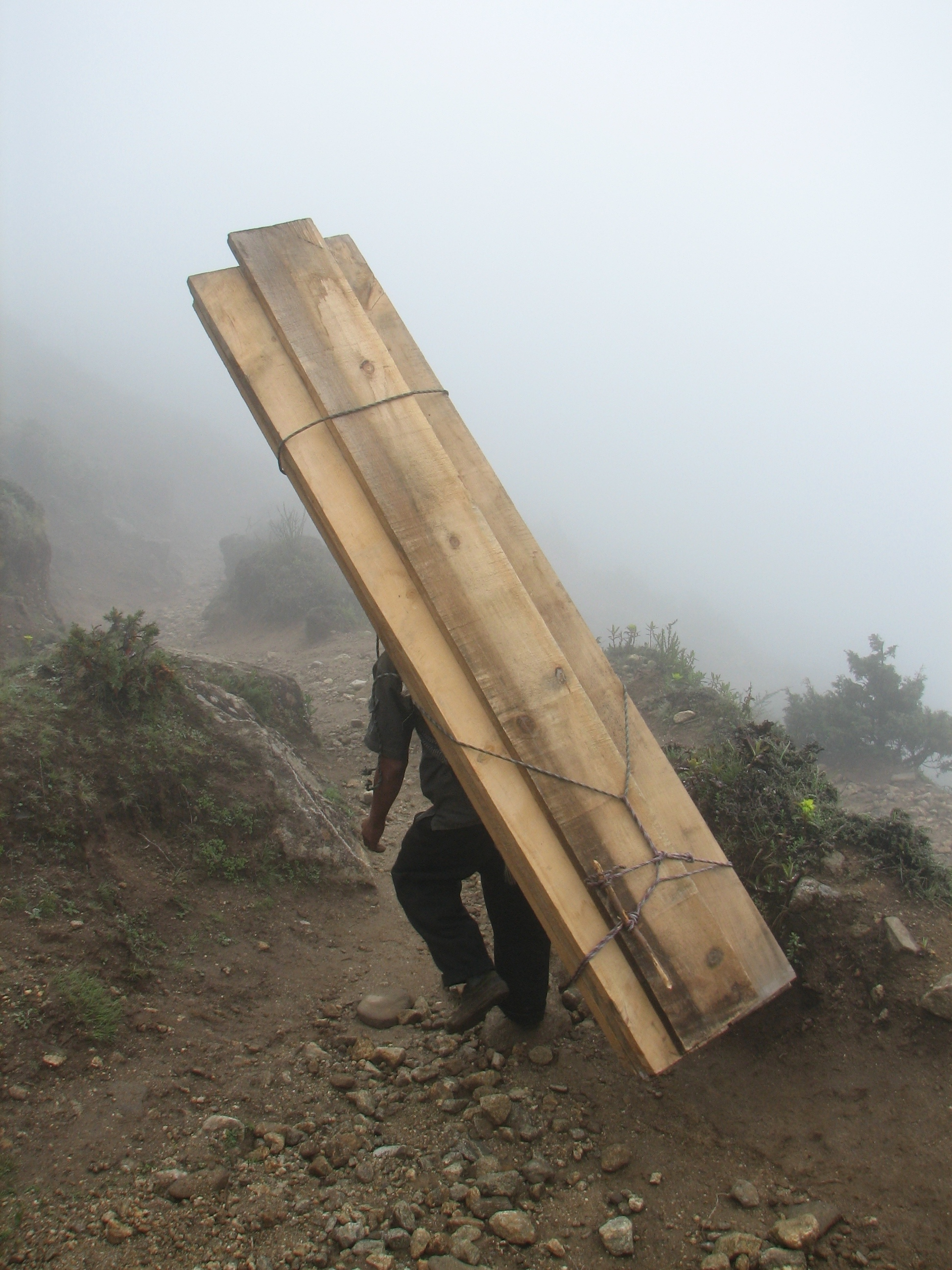
Sherpa carrying wood to Mount Everest base camp

Human-powered transport is the transport of person(s) and/or goods (freight) using human muscle power. Unlike animal-powered transport, human-powered transport has existed since time immemorial in the form of walking, running and swimming, as well as small vehicles such as litters, rickshaws, wheelchairs and wheelbarrows. Modern technology has allowed mechanical advantage devices and machines to enhance human-power.

Although motorization has increased speed and load capacity, many forms of human-powered transport remain popular for reasons of cost, convenience, leisure, physical exercise and environmentalism. Human-powered transport is sometimes the only type available, especially in underdeveloped or inaccessible regions.

== Non-vehicular modes ==
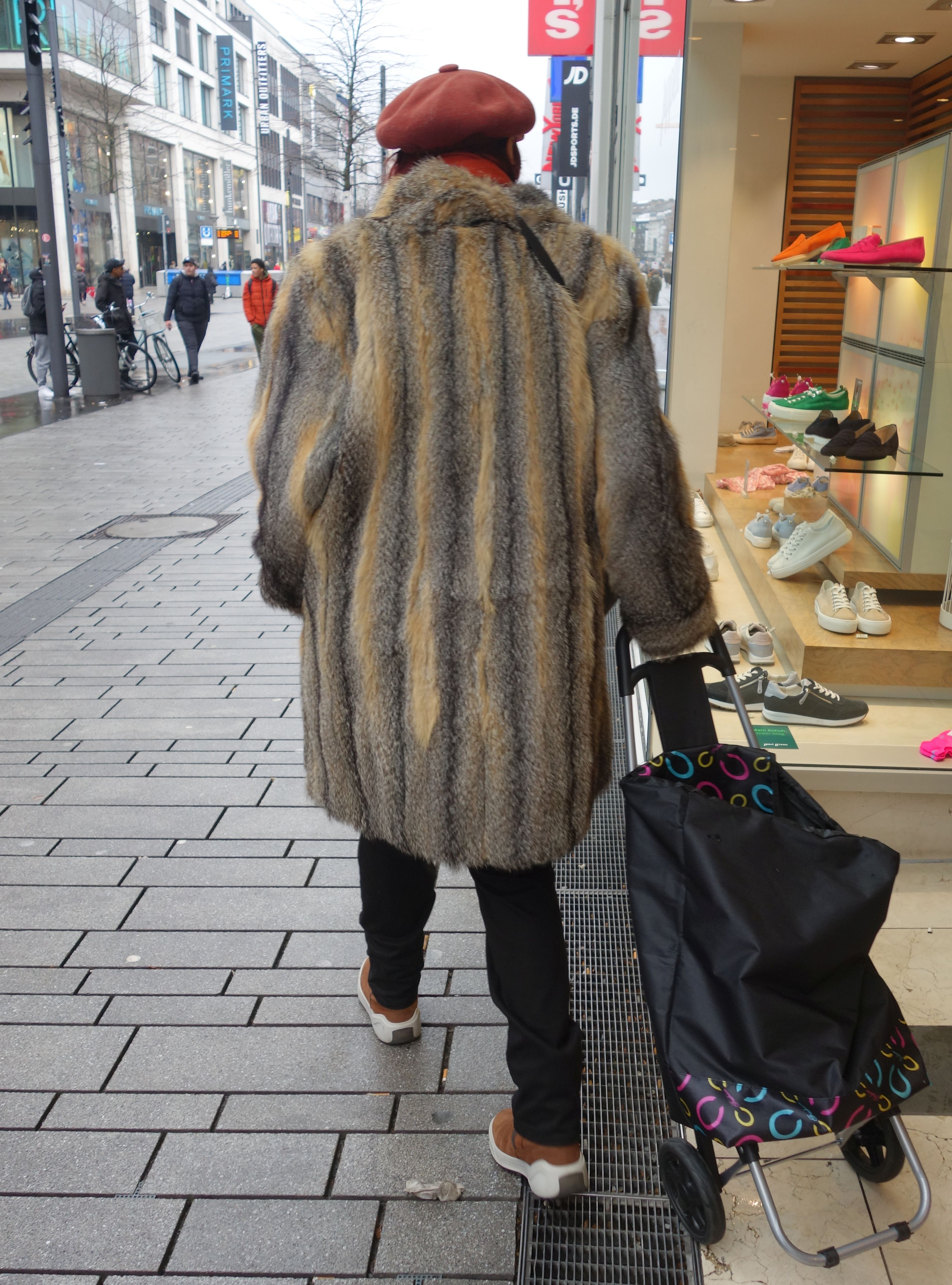
A person pulling a shopping trolley

=== Types ===
Human terrestrial locomotion except for crawling and swimming is a form of bipedalism and includes:

- Walking
  - Walking bus
- Running and sprinting
- Climbing, hiking, backpacking and mountaineering
- Ice skating, roller skating, and inline skating
- Skiing
  - Cross-country skiing
  - Ski touring

Most of these involve some equipment such as shoes, clothing and accessories.

=== Purposes ===
- Personal travel, the change of location of the involved person's body including clothing and materials required for the trip, for commuting and work, or tourism and sport.
- Transport of material using equipment such as backpacks, trolleys, carts, wheelbarrows and sleds.
- Transport of a child or further people, as with a toy wagon or a rickshaw.

== Human-powered vehicles (HPVs) ==
=== Land vehicles ===
Skateboards have the advantage of being so small and light that users can easily carry them when not skating.

The most efficient and most popular human-powered land vehicle is the bicycle. Compared to the much more common upright bicycle, an otherwise similar recumbent bicycle is faster on level ground or down hills due to better aerodynamics. This also applies to the racing bicycle, uphill as well.

The velomobile has potential to be useful in colder and wetter climates due to increased protection offered against the environment. Cargo bikes are used to transport cargo. Cycle rickshaws can be used as taxicabs.

In 2016, AeroVelo cyclist Todd Reichert achieved the human-powered speed record of 142.04 km/h (88.26 mph) with a velomobile at Battle Mountain, Nevada.

Dutch cyclist Fred Rompelberg set a 268.8 km/h (167.0 mph) speed record at the Bonneville Salt Flats in Utah on October 3, 1995, while cycling in the wake of a motor dragster pace-car. The wake of the pace-car reduced the aerodynamic drag against which Rompelberg pedalled to almost zero.

Greg Kolodziejzyk set two world records recognized by both the International Human Powered Vehicle Association and Guinness (TM) World Records on July 17, 2006, on a race track in Eureka, California. The first record is for the most distance traveled in 24 hours by human power 1,041 km (647 mi), and the second for the world's fastest 1,000 km (621 mi) time trial (23 hours, 2 minutes). Both records were broken on August 6, 2010, by Christian von Ascheberg who drove 1,000 km (621 mi) in 19 hours, 27 minutes and managed to go 1,219 km (757 mi) in 24 hours with his Milan SL Velomobile. In the same race he also raised the 12-hour record to 664.97 km (413 mi), which is an average of 55.41 km/h (34 mph).

In 1969, artists in a small Northern California town began the Kinetic sculpture race which has grown to a 42 mi (68 km), three-day all terrain, human-powered sculpture race and county wide event. It is held every year on the last weekend in May.

The Shweeb system is a proposed transit network using recumbent bicycle technology to power pods suspended from monorails. A test built in Rotorua, New Zealand is open to the public as a leisure attraction. In September 2010 the system was chosen to receive funding from Google as part of project 10^{100}. There are no active proposals for its implementation.

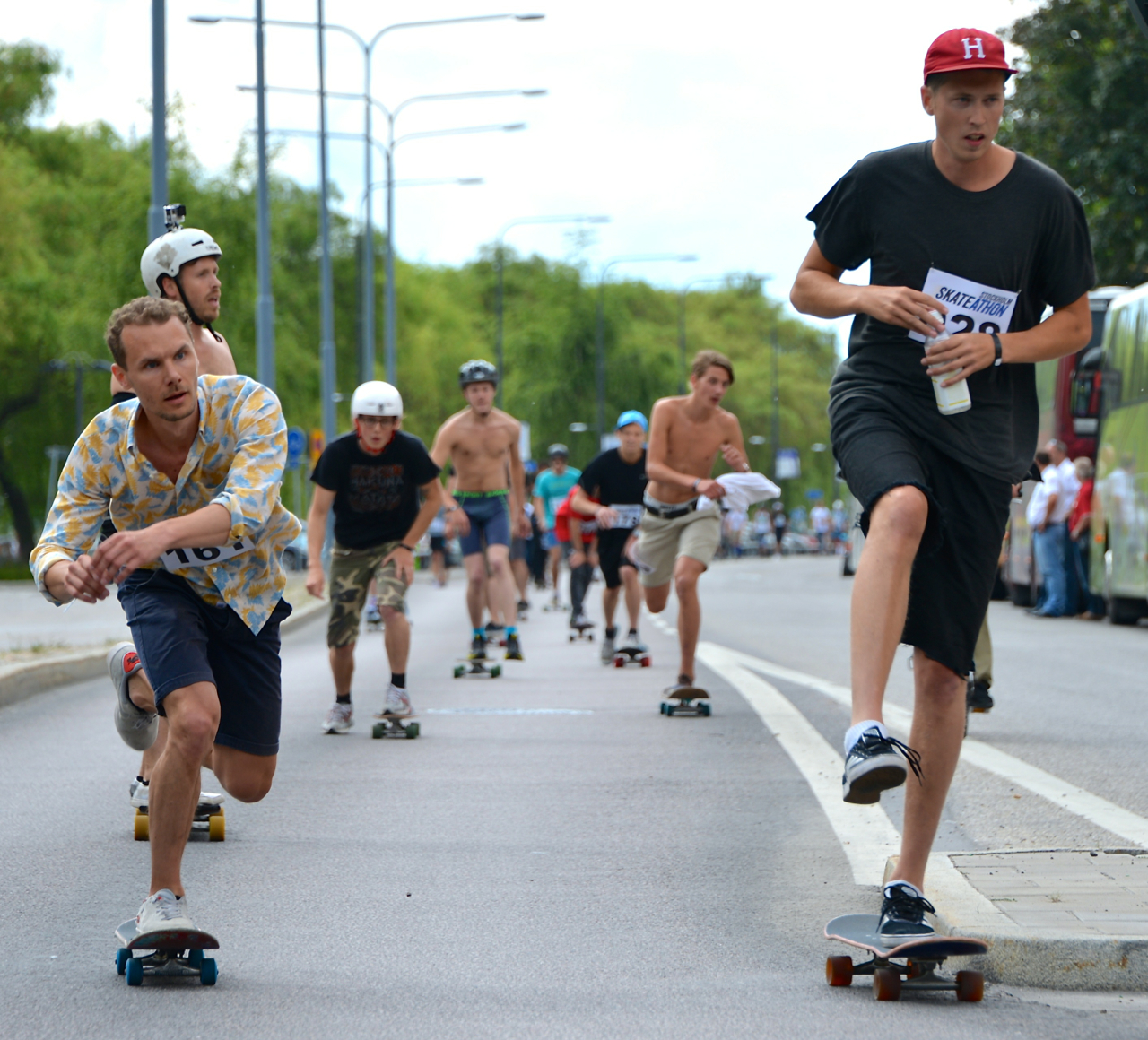
Skateboards are propelled by pushing (one foot riding on board, one foot pushing on ground) or by gravity

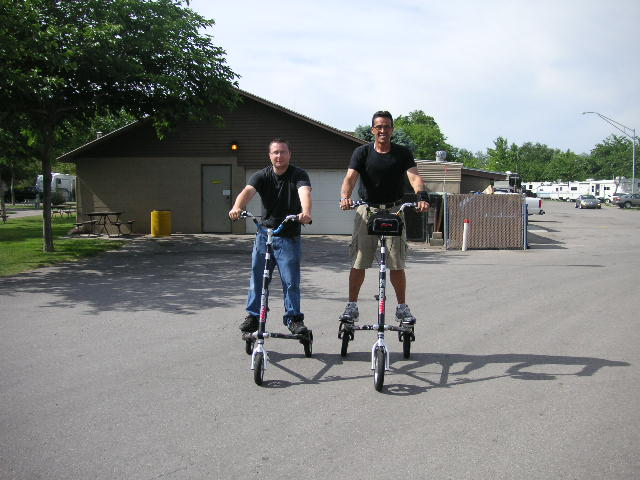
Trikkes are powered by shifting the rider's body weight

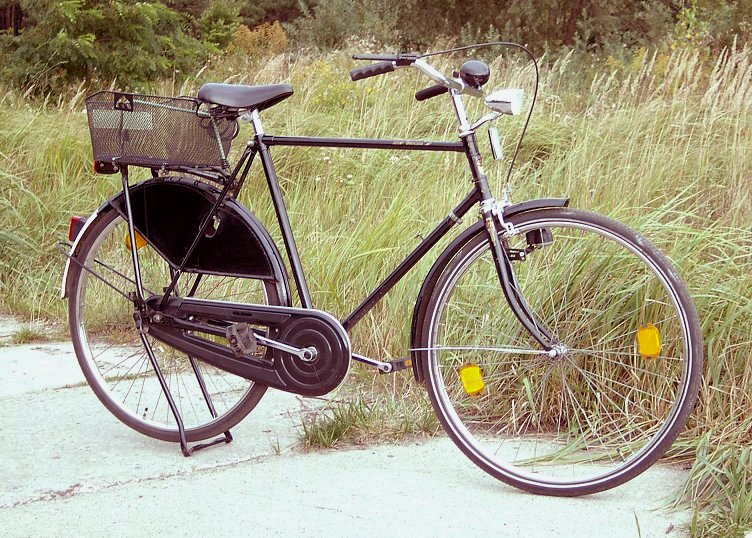
Bicycles are the most efficient type of human-powered vehicle

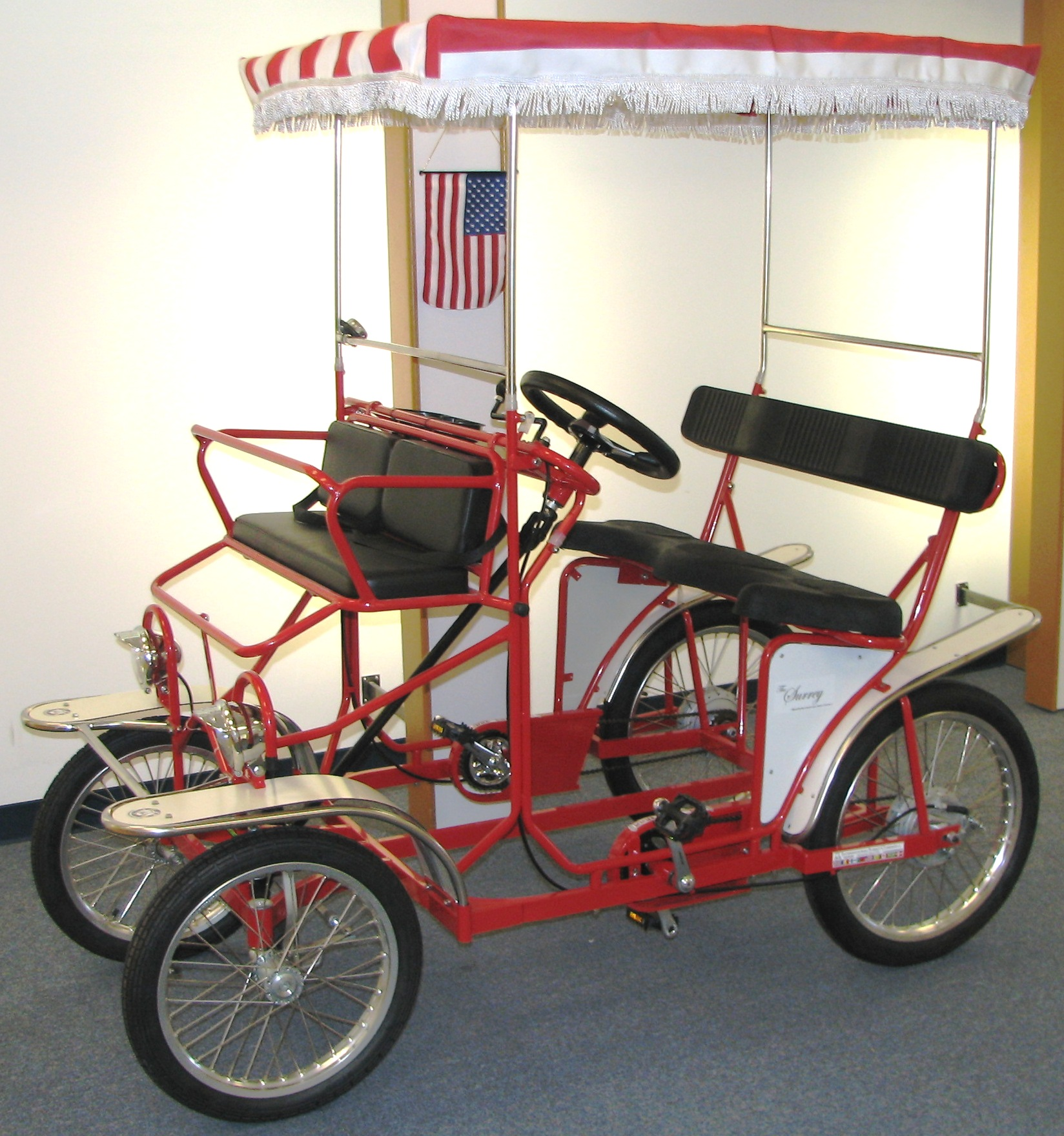
Surrey style rental quadracycle built by the International Surrey Company

=== Aircraft ===
==== Fixed wing ====
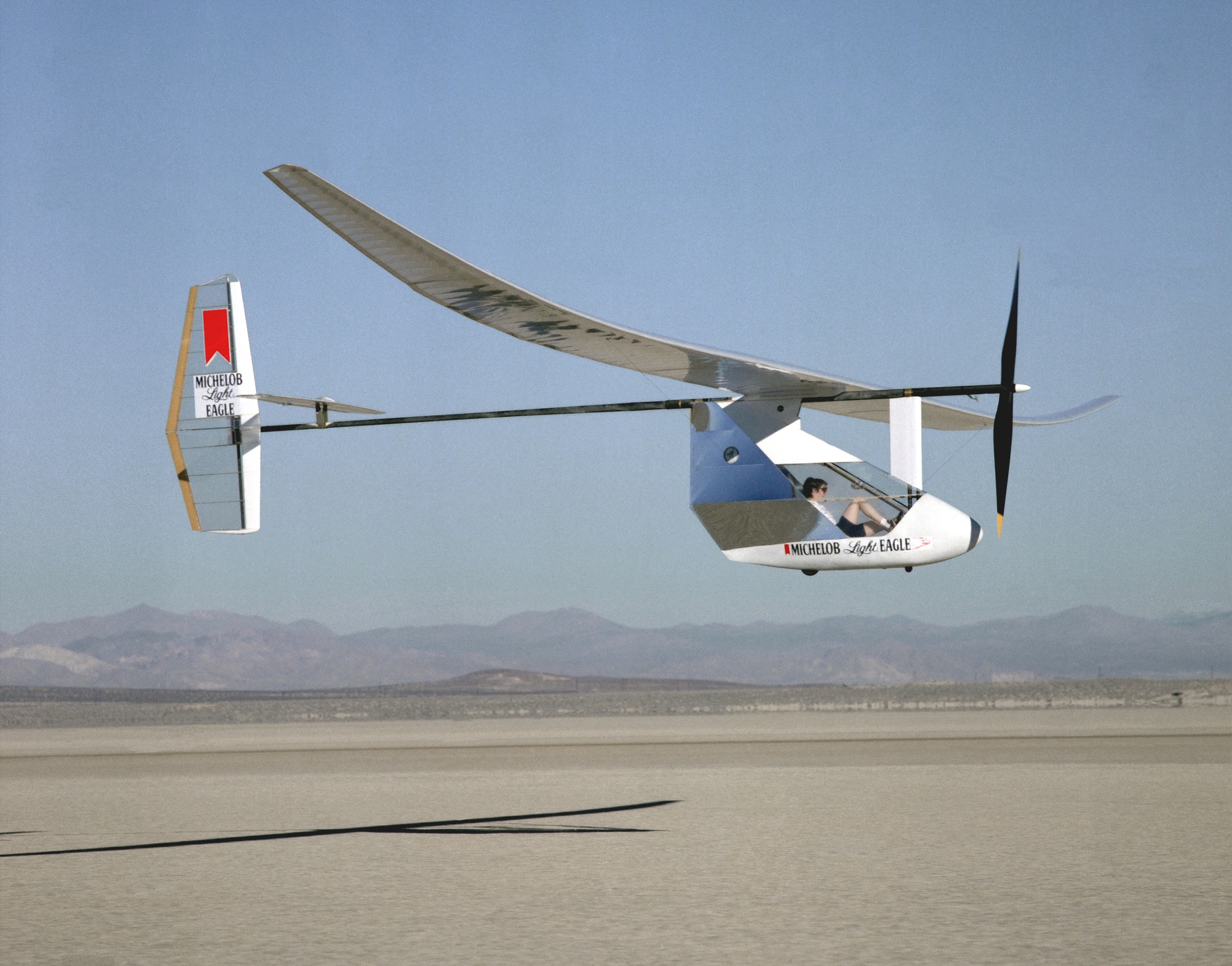
MIT Daedalus human powered aircraft

The Pedaliante flew short distances fully under human power in 1936, but the distances were not significant enough to win the prize of the Italian competition for which it was built. The flights were deemed to be a result of the pilot's significant strength and endurance, and not attainable by a typical human. Additional attempts were made in 1937 and 1938 using a catapult system, launching the plane to a height of 9 m (30 ft). With the catapult launch, the plane successfully traveled the 1 km (0.62 mi) distance outlined by the competition, but was declined the prize due to the takeoff method.

The first officially authenticated regularly feasible take-off and landing of a human-powered aircraft (one capable of powered takeoffs, unlike a glider) was made on 9 November 1961 by Derek Piggott in Southampton University's Man Powered Aircraft (SUMPAC).

Perhaps the best-known human-powered plane is the Gossamer Albatross, which flew across the English Channel in 1979.

The current distance and duration record recognized by the FAI, a straight distance of 115.11 km (71.53 mi) in 3 hours and 54 minutes, was achieved on 23 April 1988 from Heraklion on Crete to Santorini in a MIT Daedalus 88 piloted by Greek cyclist Kanellos Kanellopoulos.

The current speed record recognized by the FAI is held by Musculair 2, built by Günther Rochelt, which was flown at 44.32 kilometres per hour (27.54 mph) by Holger Rochelt in 1985.

==== Helicopters ====
The first officially observed human-powered helicopter to have left the ground was the Da Vinci III in 1989. It was designed and built by students at Cal Poly San Luis Obispo in California, USA. It flew for 7.1 seconds and reached a height of 8 in (20 cm). The second was the Yuri I in 1994, designed and built by students at Nihon University in Japan. It flew for 19.46 seconds and reached an altitude of 20 cm (8 in). On 13 June 2013, the AeroVelo Atlas was the first to complete a flight that lasted 64 seconds and reached an altitude of 3.3 meters, thus winning the Sikorsky Prize.

==== Airships and balloons ====
French inventors have built man-powered airships and balloons. Solar balloons and solar airships are new types of balloons and airships. Because lift is supplied through buoyancy, human power can be devoted to thrust.

=== Watercraft ===
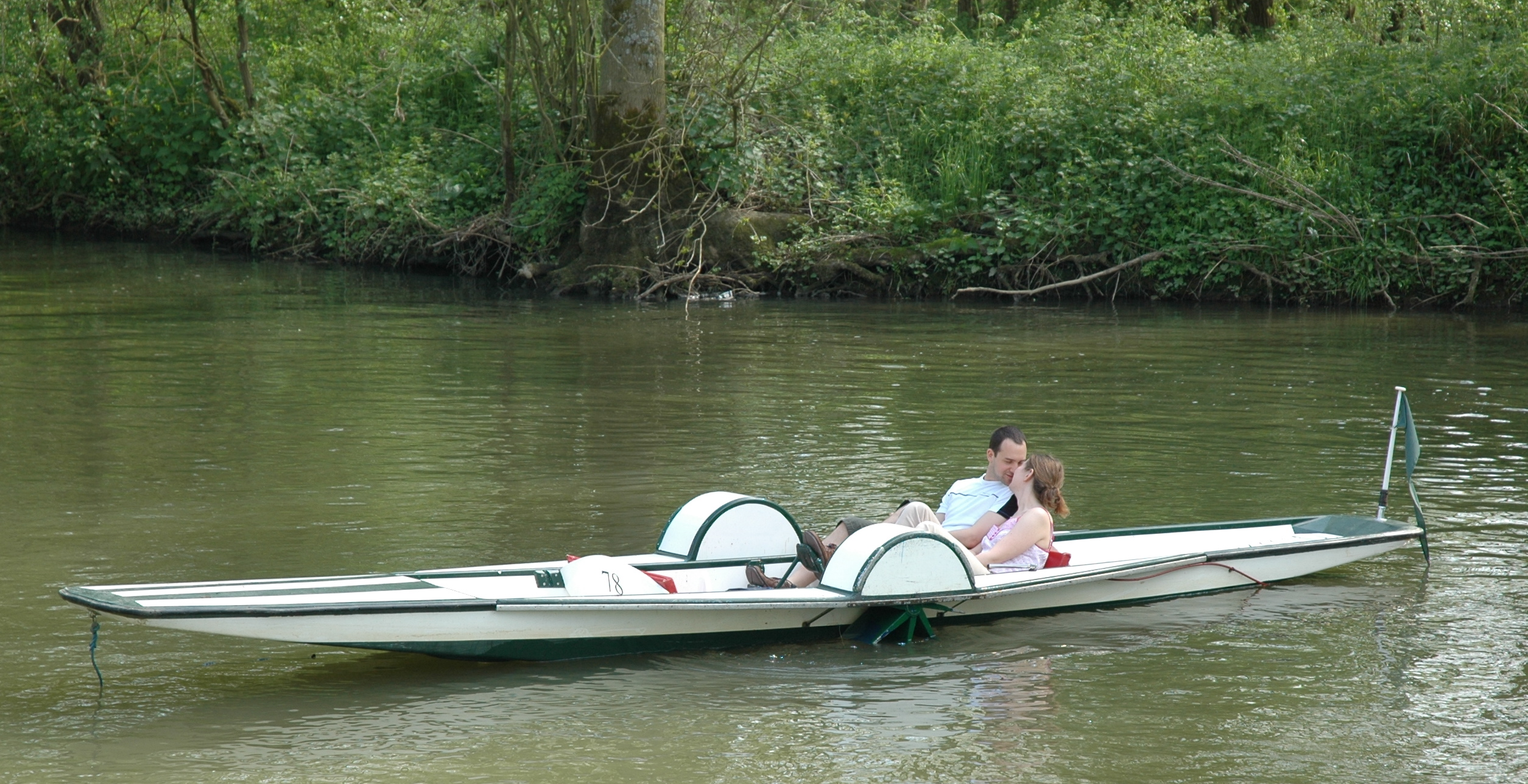
A Punt Pedalo

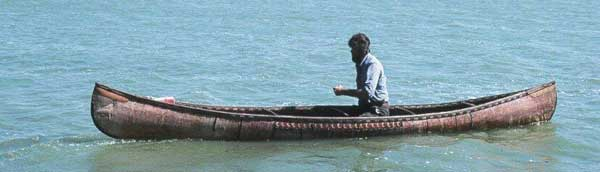
Birchbark canoe

Human-powered watercraft include prehistoric, historic and well-known traditional and sporting craft such as canoes, rowing boats and galleys. The term human-powered boat is often used for more modern craft using propellers and water wheels for propulsion. These can be more efficient than paddles or oars and especially allow the use of the leg muscles which are generally stronger than arm muscles, even for non-athletes. Competitive rowing boats use sliding seats to engage the legs for propulsion with an oar for this reason, but require considerable skill to use efficiently. In addition, there is little skill required for forward propulsion while looking forwards and craft such as pedalos are popular at resorts.

==== Hydrofoils ====
Hydrofoils have less water resistance at the highest speeds attainable by humans and are thus usually faster than displacement boats on short courses. The world speed record on water was set 27 October 1991 by MIT professor Mark Drela who pedalled a human-powered hydrofoil, "Decavitator", to 9.53 m/s (34.3 km/h; 18.52 kn; 21.3 mph) over a 100-meter course in Boston, Massachusetts, US.

==== Submarines ====
In 1989, the first human-powered International Submarine Race (ISR) was held in Florida with 17 craft. Since then nine more races have been held. The races themselves have been moved from the waters of Florida to the David Taylor Model Basin at the Carderock Division of the Naval Surface Warfare Center in Bethesda, Maryland, and are held biennially. At the 9th ISR in 2007 (in which 23 submarines participated) several new records were set: A single-person craft, Omer5 achieved a record speed of 14.881 km/h (8.035 kn) breaking the Omer team's previous record of 13.32 km/h (7.19 kn) set by Omer 4 in 2004. Also Omer 6 snatched up a record for non-propeller driven craft with a speed of 8.597 km/h (4.642 kn) .

== See also ==
- Active mobility
- Adirondack guideboat
- Animal locomotion
- Bicycle and human powered vehicle museums, list of
- Carfree city
- Carrying on the head
- Erden Eruç
- Energy efficiency in transportation
- Jason Lewis
- Rowing
- Utility cycling
