= Human-powered watercraft =

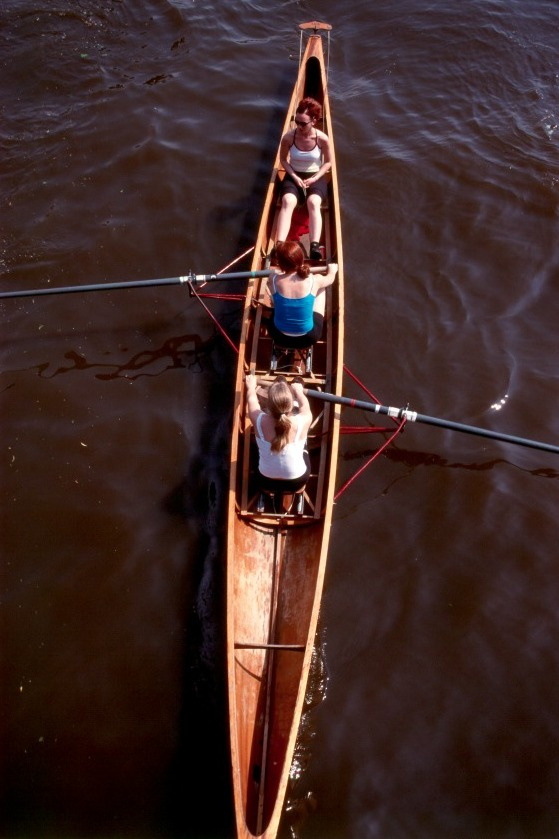
Above: sweep-oar rowing a coxed pair
Below: amphibious bicycle 'Cyclomer', Paris, 1932

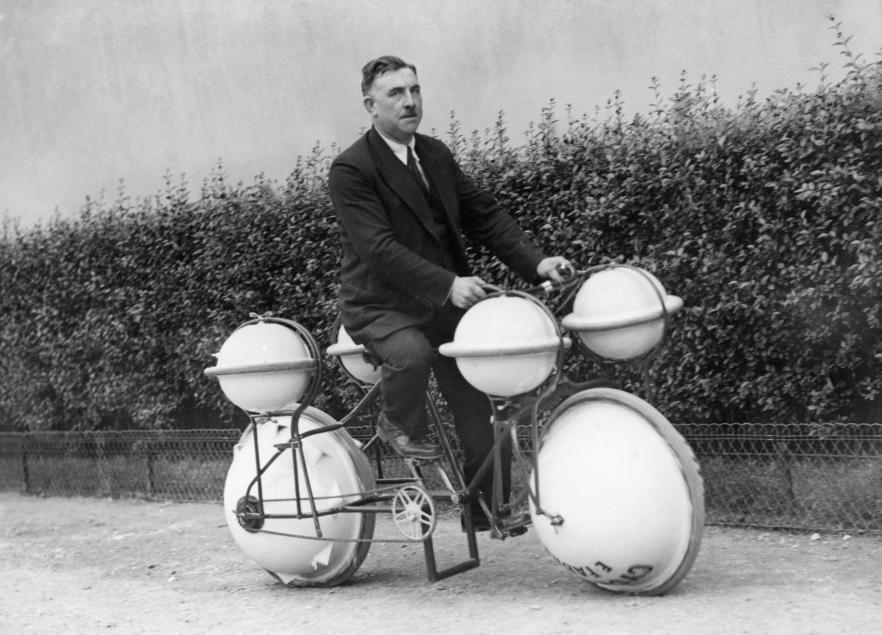

Human-powered watercraft are watercraft propelled only by human power, instead of being propelled by wind power (via one or more sails) or an engine.

The three main methods of exerting human power are:

1. directly from the hands or feet, sometimes aided by swimfins;
2. through hand-operated oars, paddles, or poles, or;
3. through the feet with pedals, crankset or treadle.

While most human-powered watercraft use buoyancy to maintain their position relative to the surface of the water, a few, such as human-powered hydrofoils and human-powered submarines, use hydrofoils, either alone or in addition to buoyancy.

== Oared craft ==
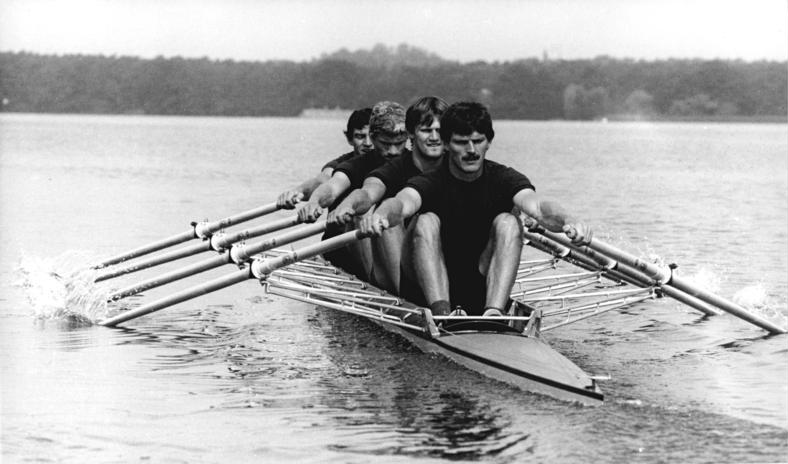
A racing scull

- Oars are held at one end, have a blade on the other end, and pivot in between in oarlocks. Such craft include:
  - Racing shell
- Using oars in pairs, with one hand on each oar, is two-oar sculling. The oars may also be called sculls. Such craft include:
  - Adirondack guideboat
  - Banks dory, Gloucester dory, and McKenzie River dory
  - Dinghy
  - Sampans rowed by foot in Ninh Bình Province of northern Vietnam.
  - Scull, Single scull, Double scull, Quad scull, and Octuple scull
  - Skiff
  - Sneakbox
  - Row boat

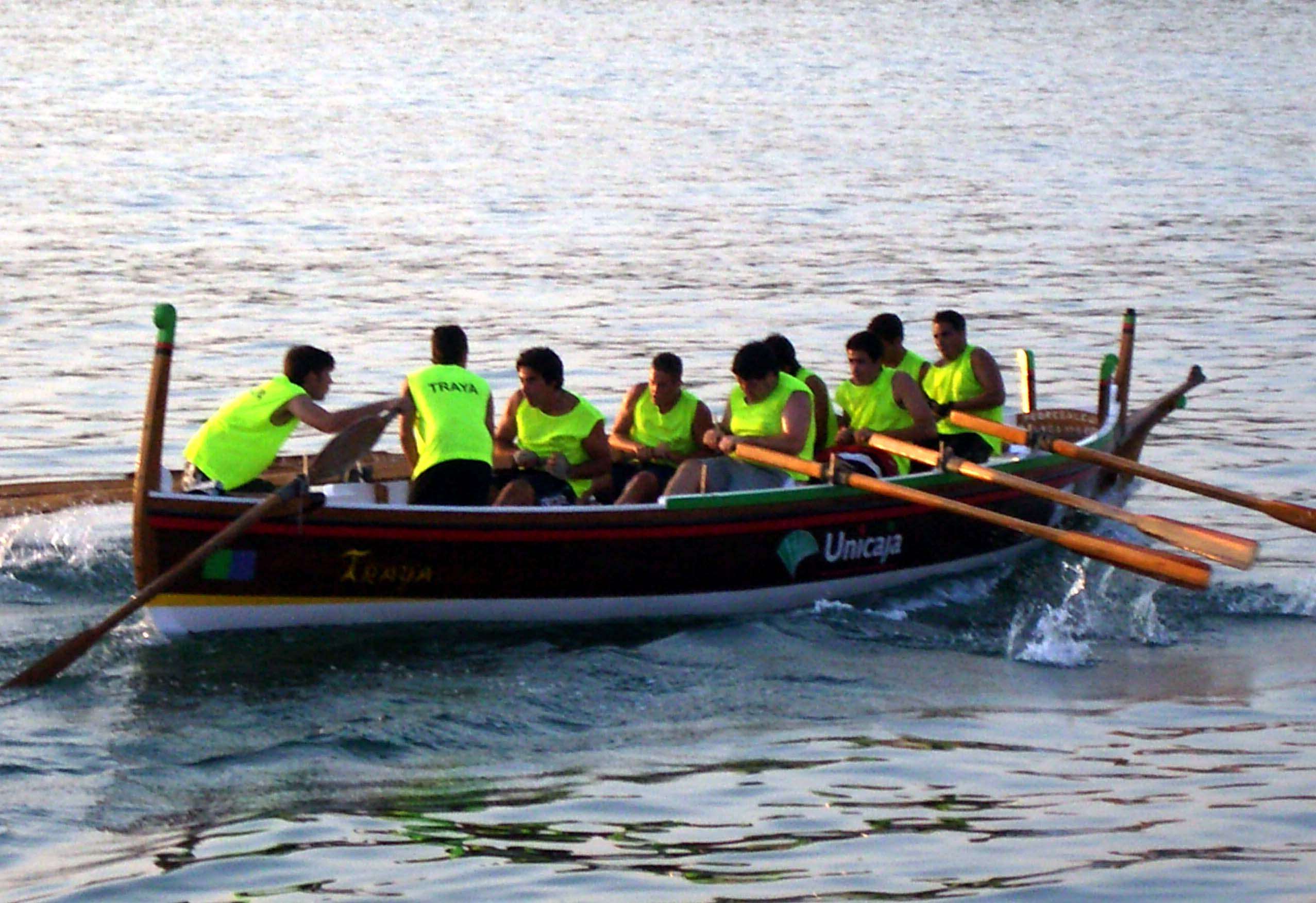
Rowing a trainera

- Using oars individually, with both hands on a single oar, is sweep rowing or sweep-oar rowing. In this case the rowers are usually paired so that there is an oar on each side of the boat. Such craft include:
  - Coxless pair, Coxed pair, Coxless four, Coxed four, and Eight
  - Galley, Dromon, Trainera, and Trireme

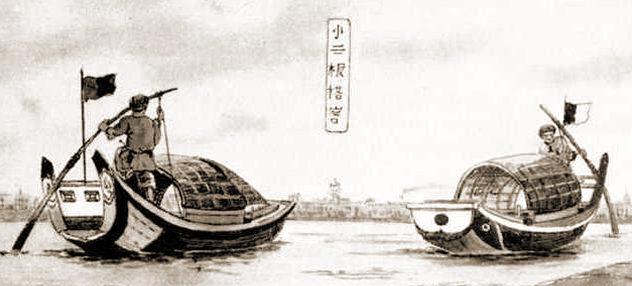
Sculling sampans

- Moving a single stern-mounted oar from side to side, while changing the angle of the blade so as to generate forward thrust on both strokes, is stern sculling or single-oar sculling. Such craft include:
  - Gondola
  - Sampan
  - Sandolo

== Paddlecraft ==
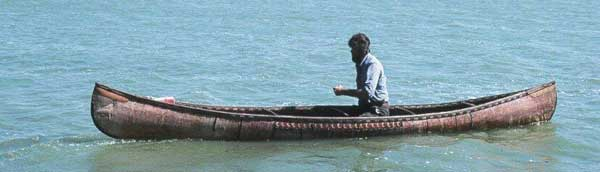
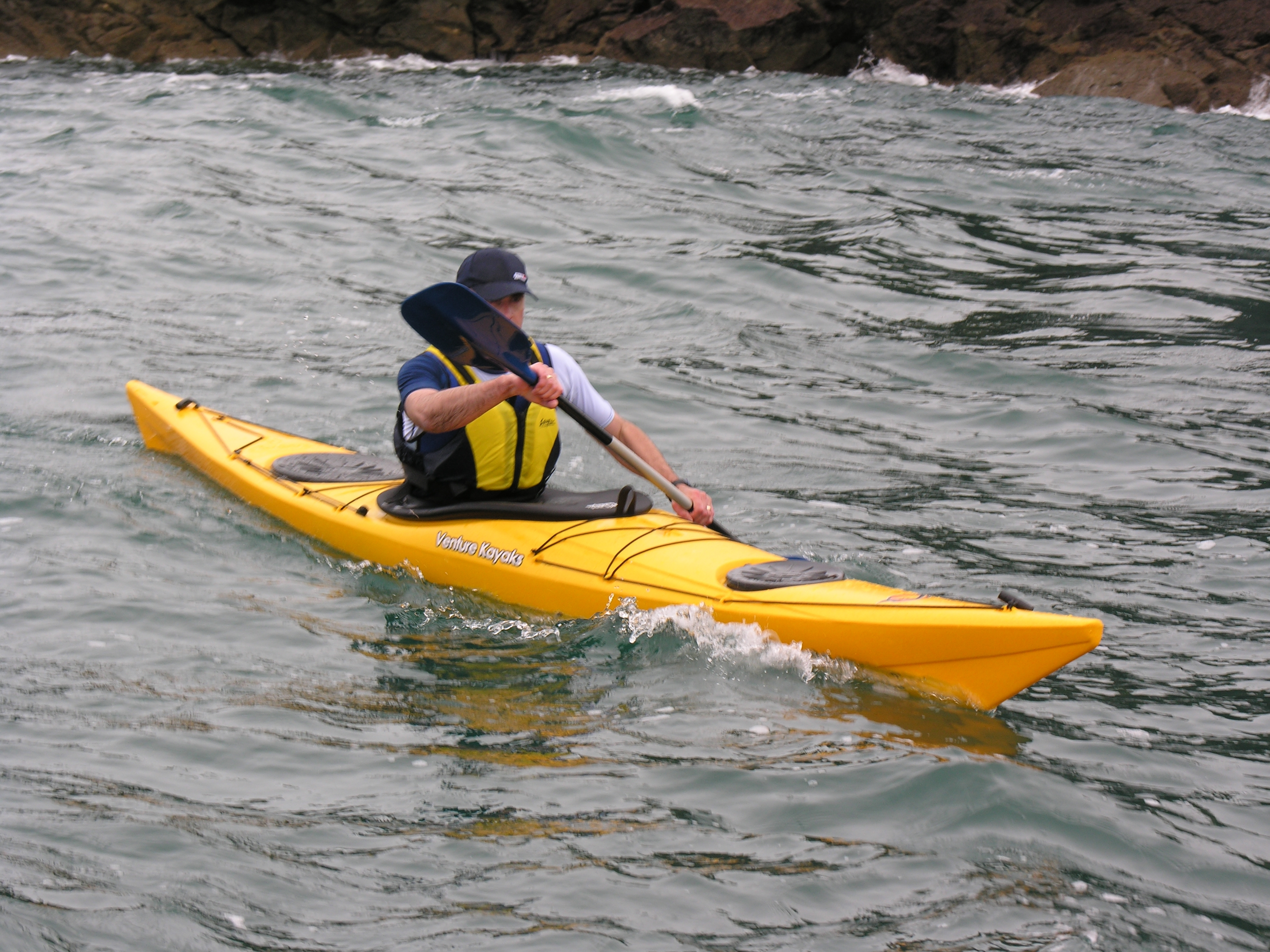
A canoe (upper) and a kayak (lower)

Paddled watercraft, or paddlecraft, uses one or more handheld paddles, each with a widened blade on one or both ends, to push water and propel the watercraft.. Commonly seen paddlecrafts include:

- Canoe, Outrigger canoe, Hasamibako bune, Umiak, Waka, Pirogue, Shikara, Dragon boat, and Dugout
- Kayak, Sea kayak, Flyak, and Baidarka
- Coracle, Tarai-bune
- Paddleboard

== Pedaled craft ==
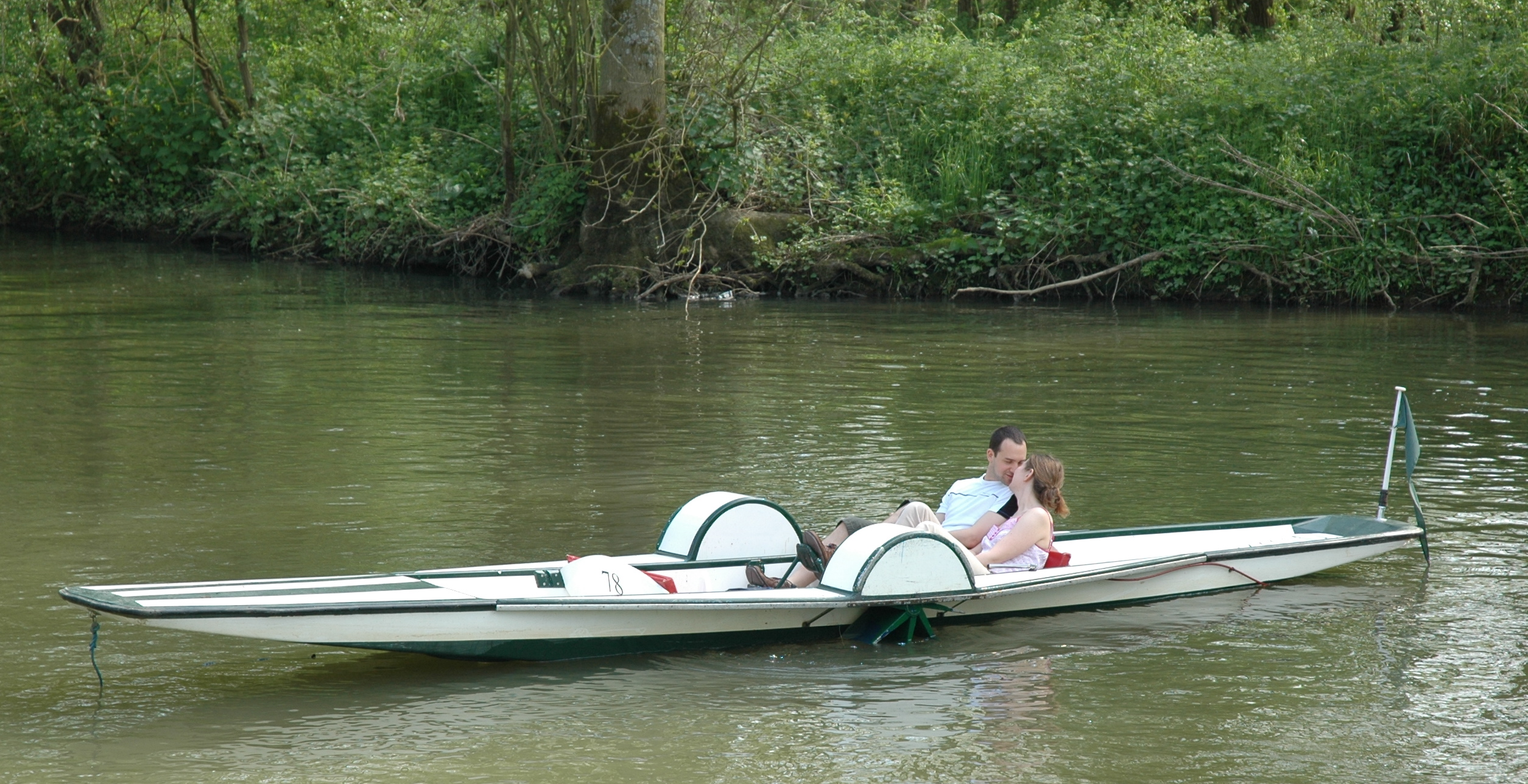
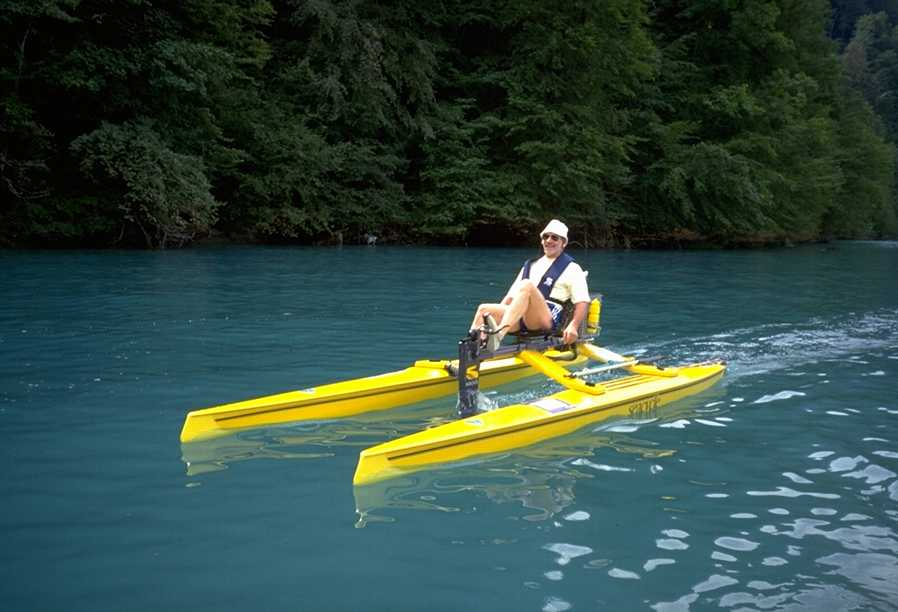
A pedalo (upper) and a hydrocycle (lower)

Pedals are attached to a crank and propelled in circles, or to a treadle and reciprocated, with the feet. The collected power is then transferred to the water with a paddle wheel, flippers, or to the air or water with a propeller.

Pedaled craft include:

- Amphibious cycle
- Hydrocycle
- Pedal-powered kayak
- Pedal-powered submersible or midget submarine
- Pedal-powered hydrofoil
- Pedalo

== Poled craft ==
A pole is held with both hands and used to push against the bottom.

Poled craft include:

- Punt
- Raft
- Makoro

== Other types ==
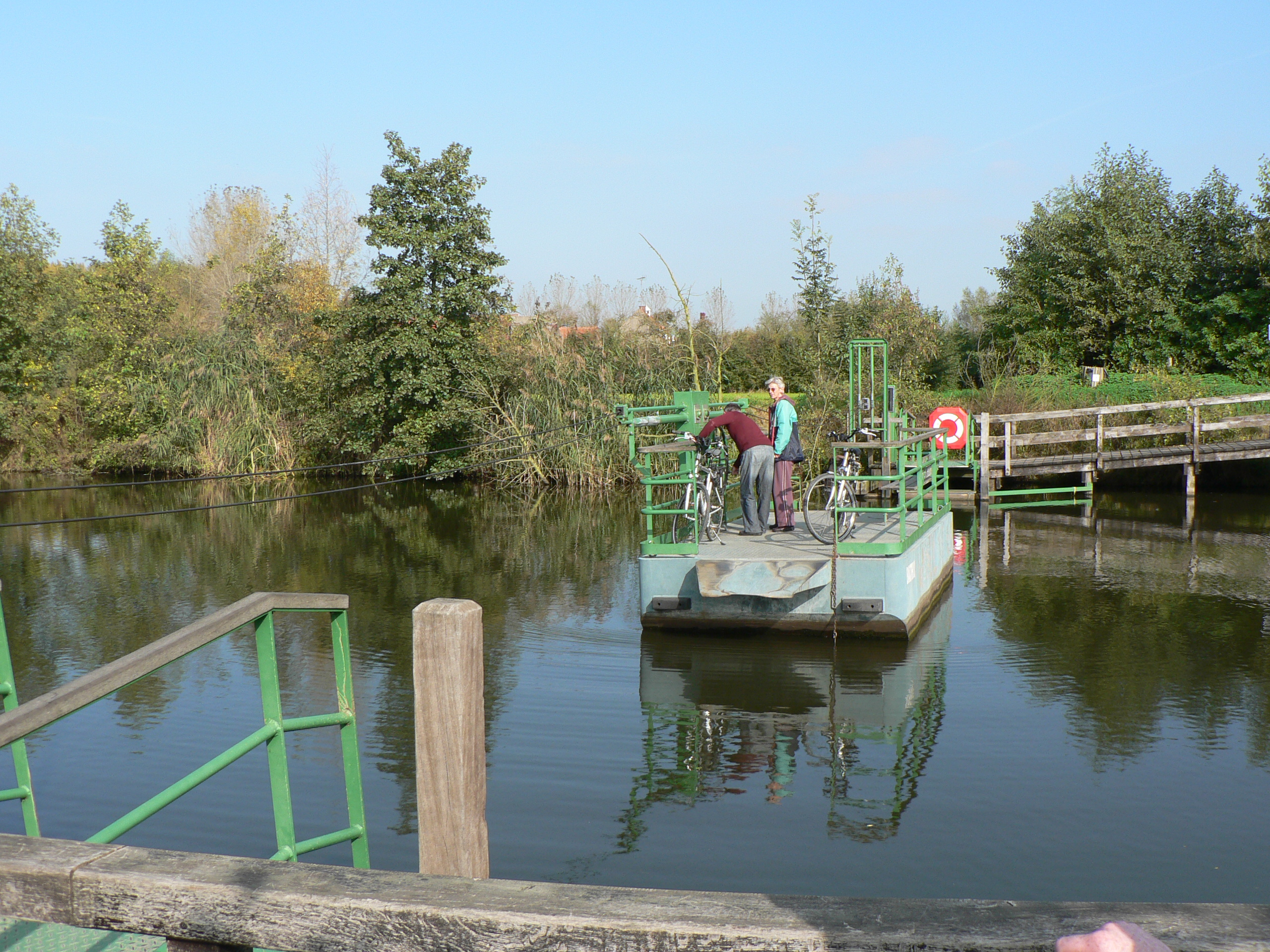
Hand-operated cable ferry

Other types of human-powered watercraft include:

- Float tube
- Hand-cranked submarine (disambiguation)
- Hand-operated cable ferry
- Bodyboarding
- Hauled barge

== Gallery ==
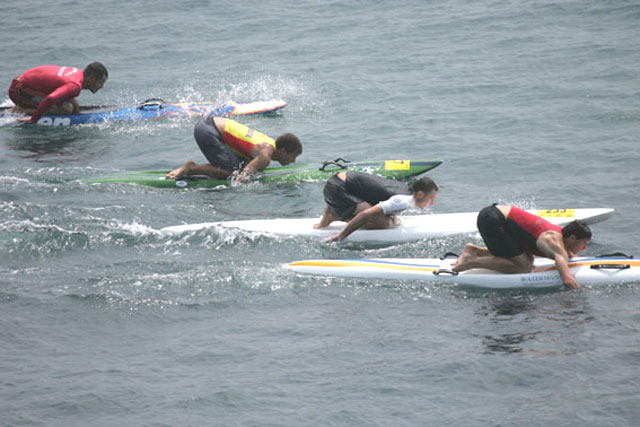
Hand paddling surfboards

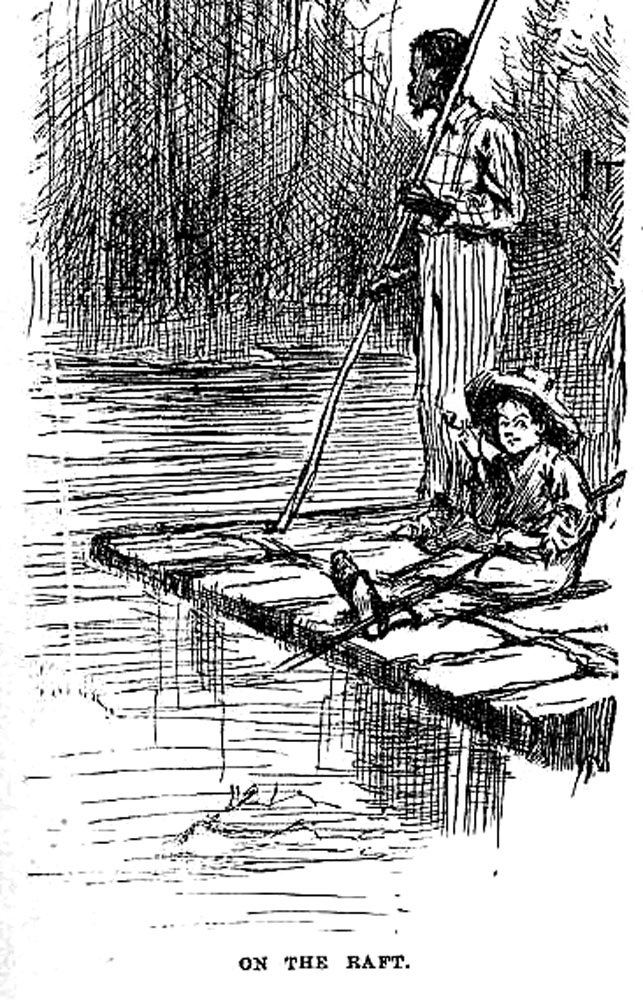
Polling a raft

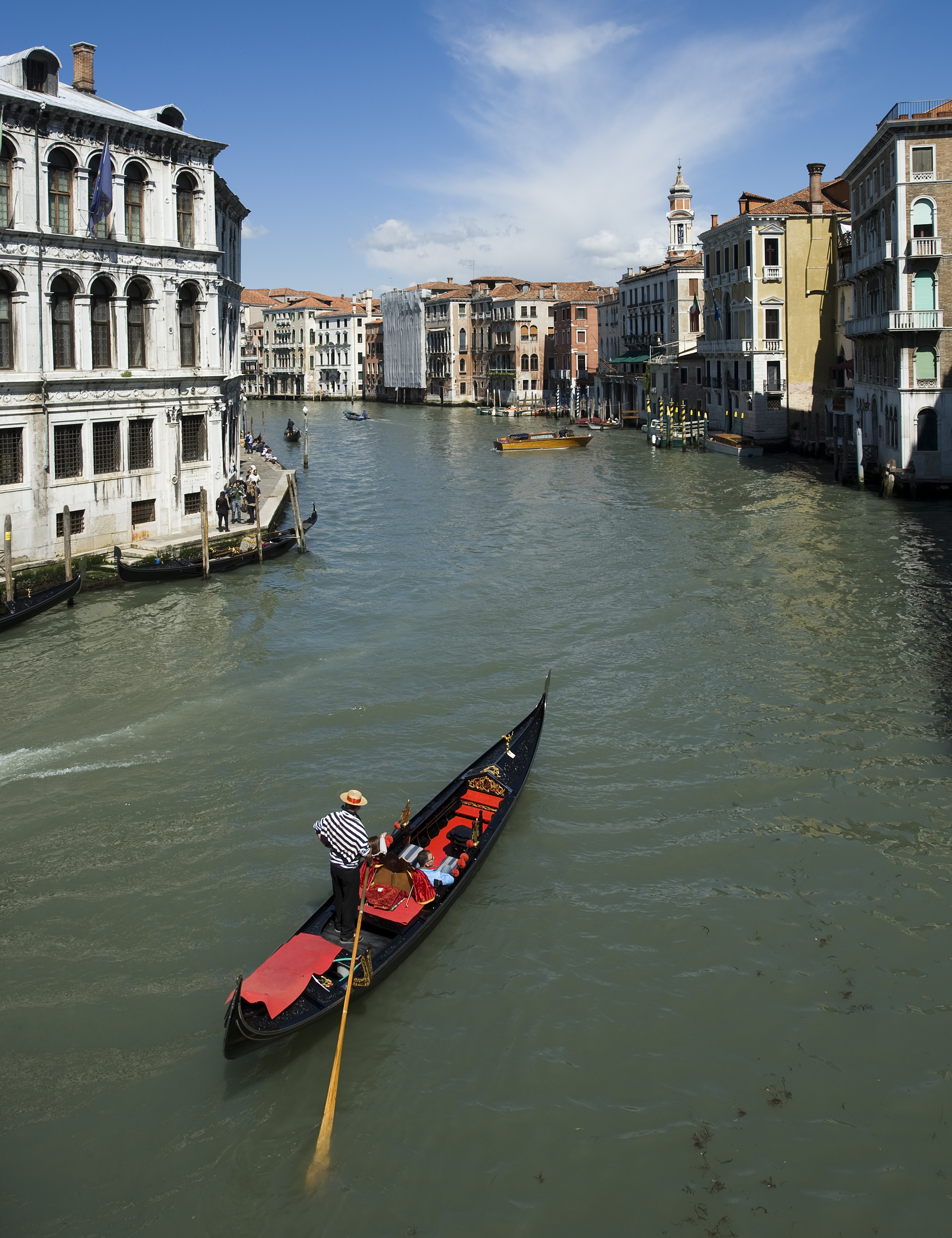
Sculling a gondola

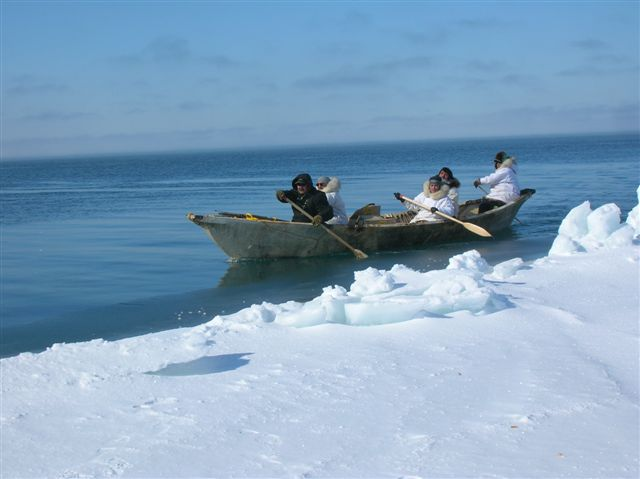
Paddling an umiak

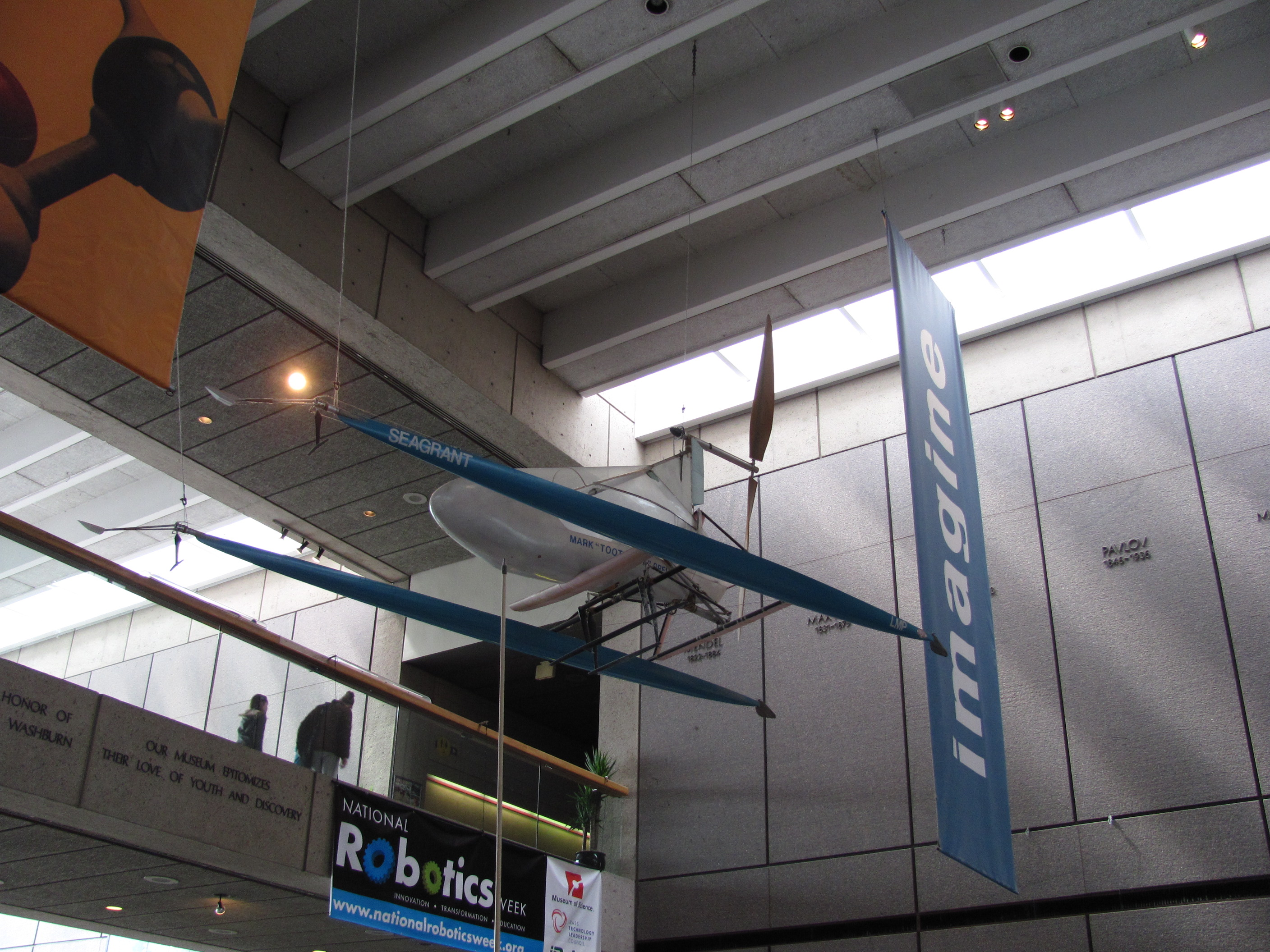
Decavitator, the world's fastest human-powered watercraft, is a pedal-powered hydrofoil

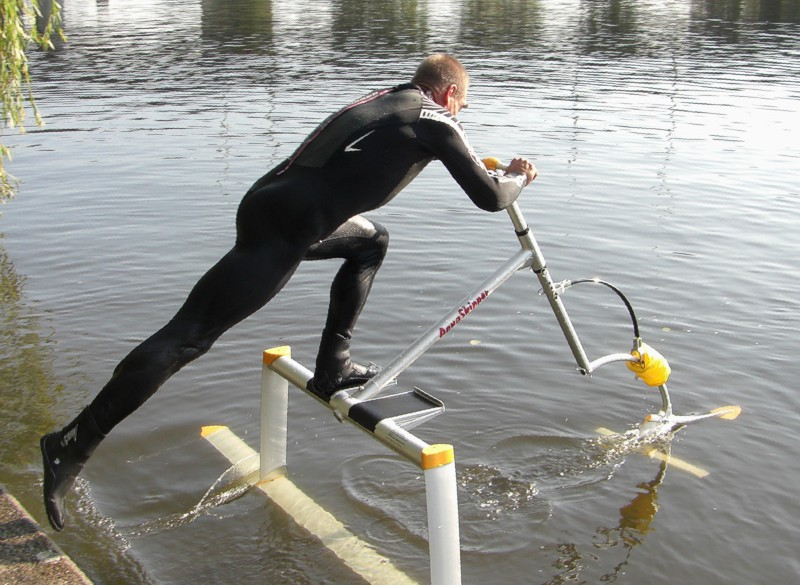
Starting an AquaSkipper hydrofoil

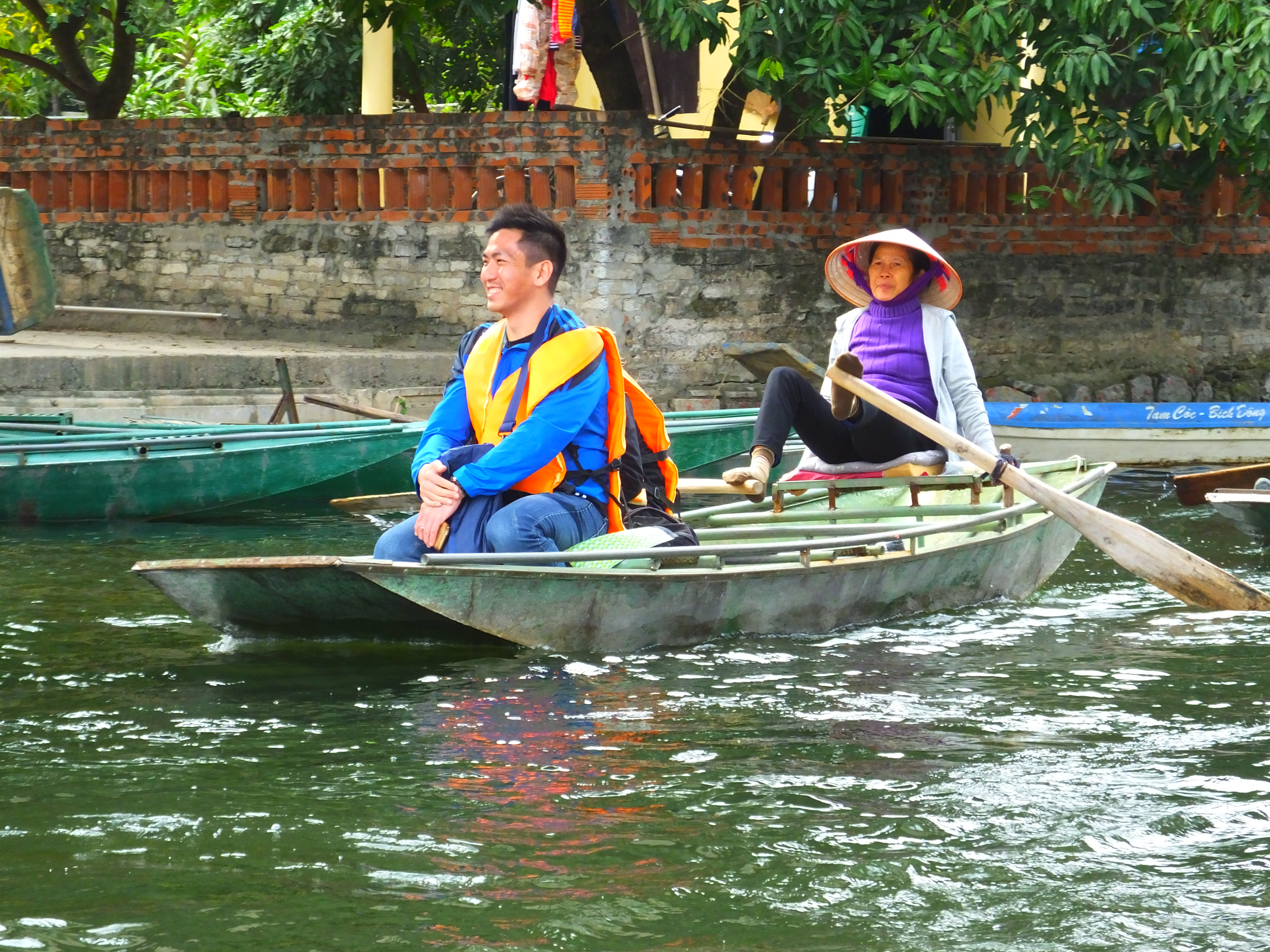
Woman rowing sampan with her feet in Ninh Bình Province of northern Vietnam

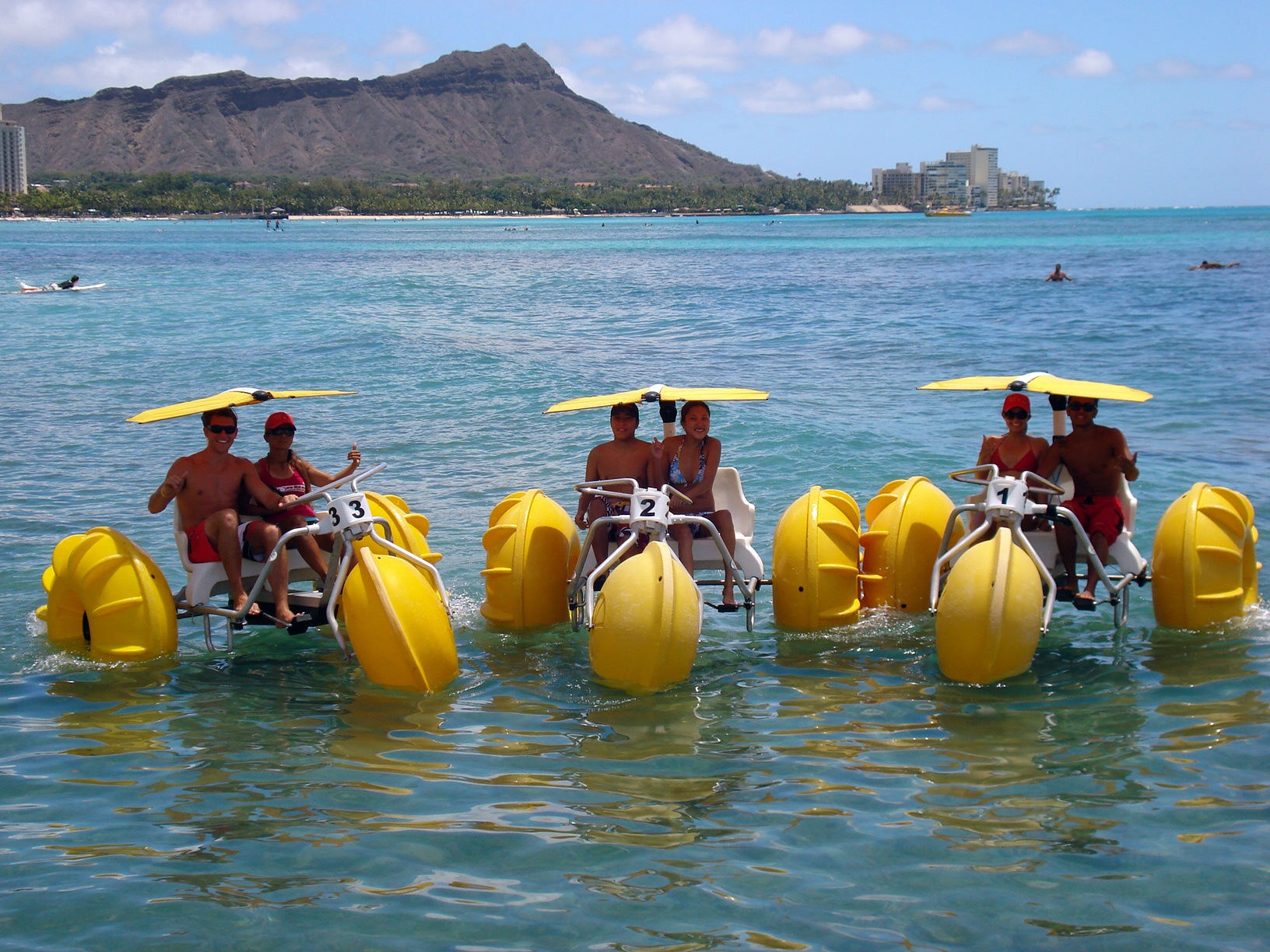
Human powered aqua-cycle water trikes in the Pacific Ocean with Diamond Head, Hawaii in the background.

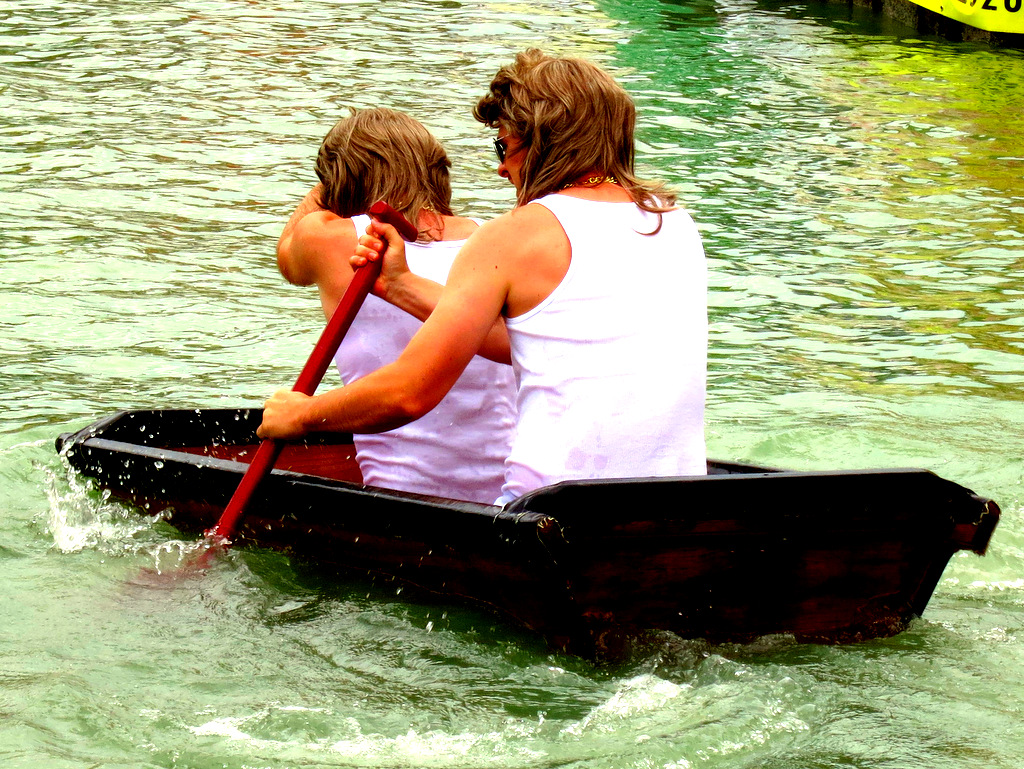
race in a wooden sow trough (ge: Sautrogrennen) in Bavaria, Germany (2012)

== See also ==
- Ocean rowing
- Fiann Paul
