= Flyak =

Kayak adapted with hydrofoils

The Flyak is a hydrofoil adaptation to the conventional kayak. It uses twin hydrofoils designed to raise the hull out of the water to increase the speed. Speeds of up to 27.2 km/h (7.6 m·s^{−1}, 16.9 mph) can be achieved on calm water.

== Design ==
The Flyak has two hydrofoil fins below the surface of the water to create lift. At high speeds the entire hull is lifted 15 cm (5.9 in) from the water, reducing the drag and allows greater speeds – reportedly more than twice the speed of a conventional kayak.

== History ==
The Flyak was designed by Einar Rasmussen and Peter Ribe in Norway and released in 2005. The hydrofoil lift method is well established for motor- and man-powered water craft, but the Flyak is the first to incorporate the design into a commercially marketed kayak. Initial price estimate is US$2500.

== Comparisons and records ==
A 200 m sprint, pitting Olympic athlete Andreas Gjersøe in a Flyak against the four-man Norwegian National Team in a K4 kayak, took place on November 13, 2005. This race was featured on "Beyond Tomorrow" broadcast on February 8, 2006. It was reported that the Flyak won by a boat length and a half. A K1 sprint specialist in a conventional kayak would expect to be some five seconds slower than a four-man boat over 200 m.

== See also ==
- Kayak
- Human-powered hydrofoil
- Human-powered watercraft
- Hydrofoil
