= Speak (band) =

American synth-pop band

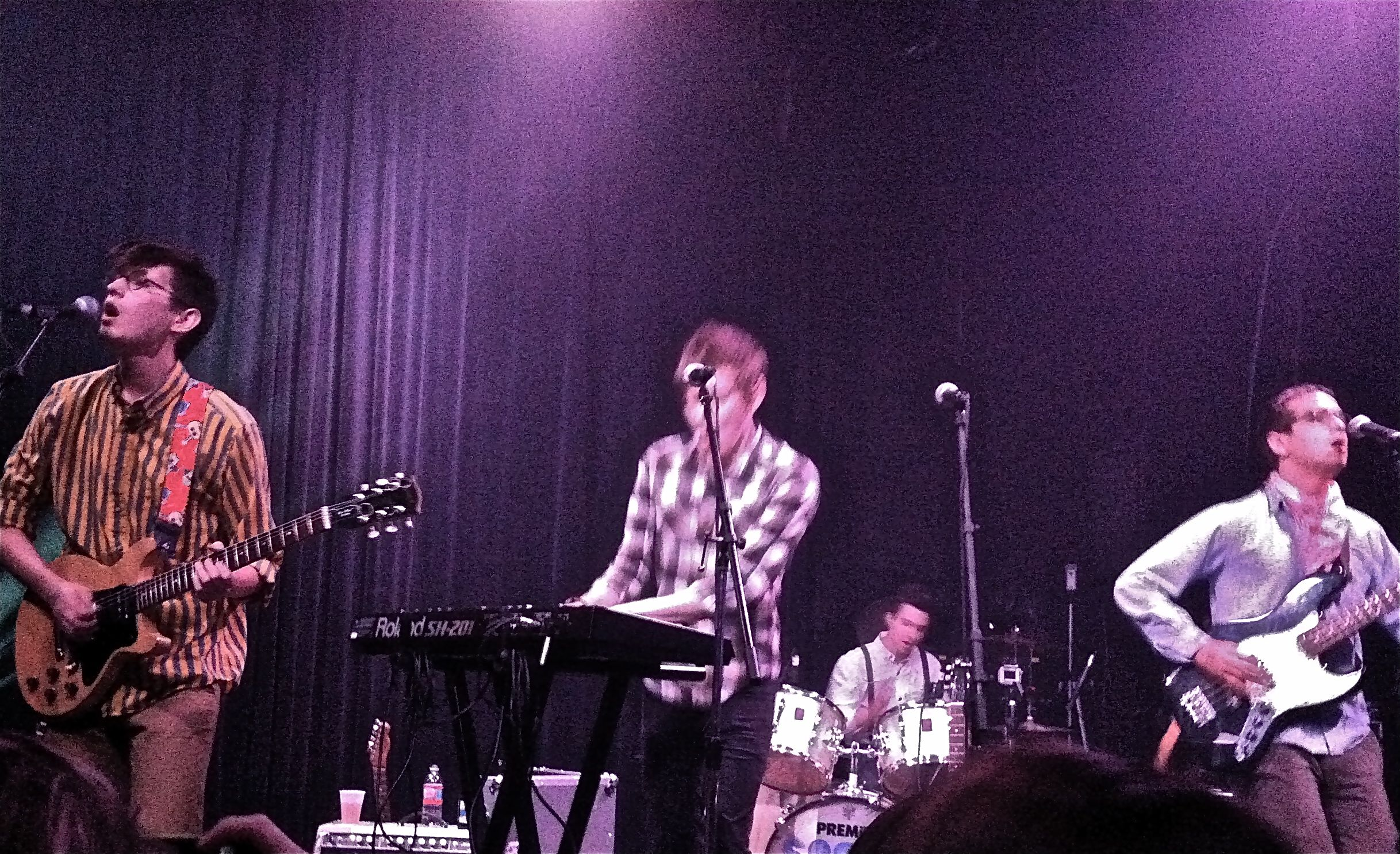
- Speak performing live in Austin, Texas

Background information
- Origin: Austin, Texas, United States
- Genres: Synthpop, indie rock
- Years active: 2008-2016
- Labels: Playing In Traffic Records
- Members: Troupe Gammage; Joey Delahoussaye; Jake Stewart; Nick Hurt
- Website: www.hearspeakhere.com

Speak (stylized SPEAK) was a synth-pop band from Austin, Texas formed in 2008. The band consisted of Troupe Gammage (keyboard and lead vocals), Nick Hurt (guitar and vocals), Joey Delahoussaye (bass and vocals), and Jake Stewart (drums). The band released their debut single Carrie in 2011, and their debut album I Believe In Everything in late 2011. The band dissolved sometime during or after 2016, with their last song being "One House Town", a collaboration with RAC.

== History ==
=== Beginning ===
Speak had its beginnings with Jupiter-4, a band founded by high school friends Troupe Gammage, Jake Stewart, and Nick Hurt. The band became Speak when bassist Joey Delahoussaye joined the group in 2008. In 2010 they won the Austin Music Award for Best New Band and the following year won the award for Best Indie Group. They garnered attention in 2010, when they performed at the 2010 Austin City Limits Music Festival. Their debut EP, Hear Here, was released in February 2010 and garnered positive reviews, with The A.V. Club giving the EP a B+ and the Austin Chronicle giving 4 stars out of 4 saying that Speak is "poised to change the musical landscape." In 2011 Speak accompanied Tally Hall and Casey Shea across a national tour of the United States.

=== I Believe In Everything ===
Speak released their debut album I Believe In Everything on iTunes on September 27, 2011, and played a release concert on October 1, 2011, in Austin Texas, prior to the album release the band released "Carrie" and "You Know As Well As I" for free download, and the album in its entirety was streamed on Pure Volume. In late 2011, Speak performed a handful of shows to promote their newly released album the first show was in Vienna Virginia on October 18. The band has since then opened for Tegan and Sara and Jukebox the Ghost, and has played a collection of shows across North America.

=== Girl Songs ===
In 2013 the group released the EP Girl Songs which was sung entirely in a cappella by lead singer, Troupe Gammage. 2013 also saw the release of the single Peaks off of their upcoming second album, Pedals.

== Discography ==
=== Singles ===
- Foreign Love (2010)
- Carrie (2011)
- Digital Love (2012)
- Peaks (2013)
- One House Town (2015)

=== Extended plays ===
- Hear Here (2010)
- Girl Songs (2013)

=== Studio albums ===
- I Believe in Everything (September 2011)
- Pedals (June 2014)
