= Pedals (Speak album) =

Studio album by Speak
- Released: 23 June 2014
- Recorded: Austin
- Genre: Rock; indie; synthpop; pop
- Length: 55:01
- Label: Playing In Traffic; Wind-up Records
- Producer: Troupe Gammage

Speak chronology
I Believe in Everything (2011)	Pedals (2014)

Pedals is the second and final album by Austin-based synth pop band Speak. The album was released on June 23, 2014 on Wind-up Records. Unlike the previous album, this was self-produced by member Troupe Gammage.

== Track listing ==
No.	Title	Length
1.	"Gates"	3:42
2.	"Mystery Lights"	4:01
3.	"Nightlight"	3:34
4.	"Weiss"	0:54
5.	"This Much I Know"	2:23
6.	"Peaks"	5:51
7.	"Oh Lord"	3:14
8.	"Modern Art"	3:48
9.	"Be Reasonable, Diane"	4:32
10.	"Congo"	3:42
11.	"Heavy Metal War"	3:09
12.	"11/12/13"	4:58
13.	"The Meantime"	5:50
14.	"Trials"	5:23
Total length:		55:01
