= I Believe in Everything (album) =

I Believe In Everything

Studio album by Speak
- Released: 2011; 09; 27
- Recorded: Austin
- Genre: Rock; indie; synth-pop; pop
- Length: 33:11
- Label: Playing In Traffic; Modern Art
- Producer: Chris Smith

Speak chronology
I Believe In Everything (00000004)	Pedals (2014)

I Believe In Everything is the debut album by Austin-based synth pop band Speak. The album was released on September 27, 2011, on Modern Art Records.

== Overview ==
I Believe In Everything was streamed on PureVolume in its entirety, and also featured a remix of the song Carrie by Miniature Tigers. The album features four songs from the band's first EP, and Speak played the album's release concert on October 1, 2011, in Austin Texas.

== 2011 track listing ==
No.	Title	Length
1.	"Wars"	3:08
2.	"Carrie"	3:49
3.	"You Know As Well As I"	3:23
4.	"I'd Rather Lie"	3:21
5.	"Stand By Us"	2:31
6.	"Louder"	3:26
7.	"Firecracker"	3:38
8.	"A Little Way"	3:36
9.	"81"	4:03
10.	"Too Afraid"	2:19
11.	"Carrie (Miniature Tigers Remix)"	3:50
Total length:		33:11
