= Pedal Pusher (disambiguation) =

Pedal Pusher is a play written by the English director and playwright, Roland Smith.

Pedal Pusher(s), Pedal pusher(s) or Pedalpusher(s) may also refer to:

- Pedal pushers, a calf-length trouser
- "Pedalpusher", song by Stereophonics on 2005 album Language. Sex. Violence. Other?
