= Hand-cranked submarine =

Hand-cranked submarine may refer to:

- USS Alligator (1862)
- American Diver
- Bayou St. John submarine
- H. L. Hunley (submarine)
- Intelligent Whale
- Nautilus (1800 submarine)
- Pioneer (submarine)
- Sub Marine Explorer
- Turtle (submersible)
