= Peddle (surname) =

Peddle is a surname. Notable people with the surname include:

- Ambrose Peddle (1927–2014), Canadian politician
- Chuck Peddle (1937–2019), American computer hardware engineer
- John B. Peddle (1868–1933), American professor of machine design
- Julian Peddle (born 1955), English entrepreneur
- Juliet Peddle (1899–1979), American architect
- Geoff Peddle (born 1963), Anglican bishop
- Mark Peddle (fl. 21st century), Canadian musician
