= Human-powered hydrofoil =

Small hydrofoil watercraft

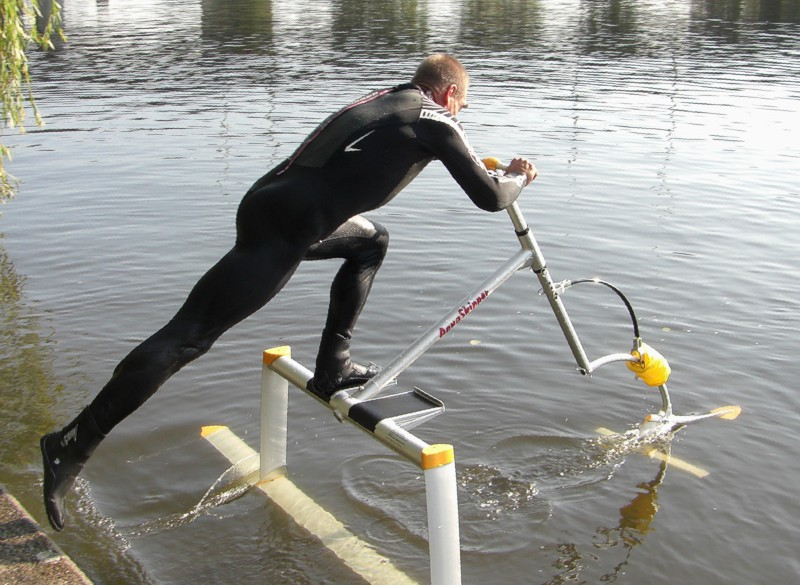
Starting an AquaSkipper on the river Spree in Berlin

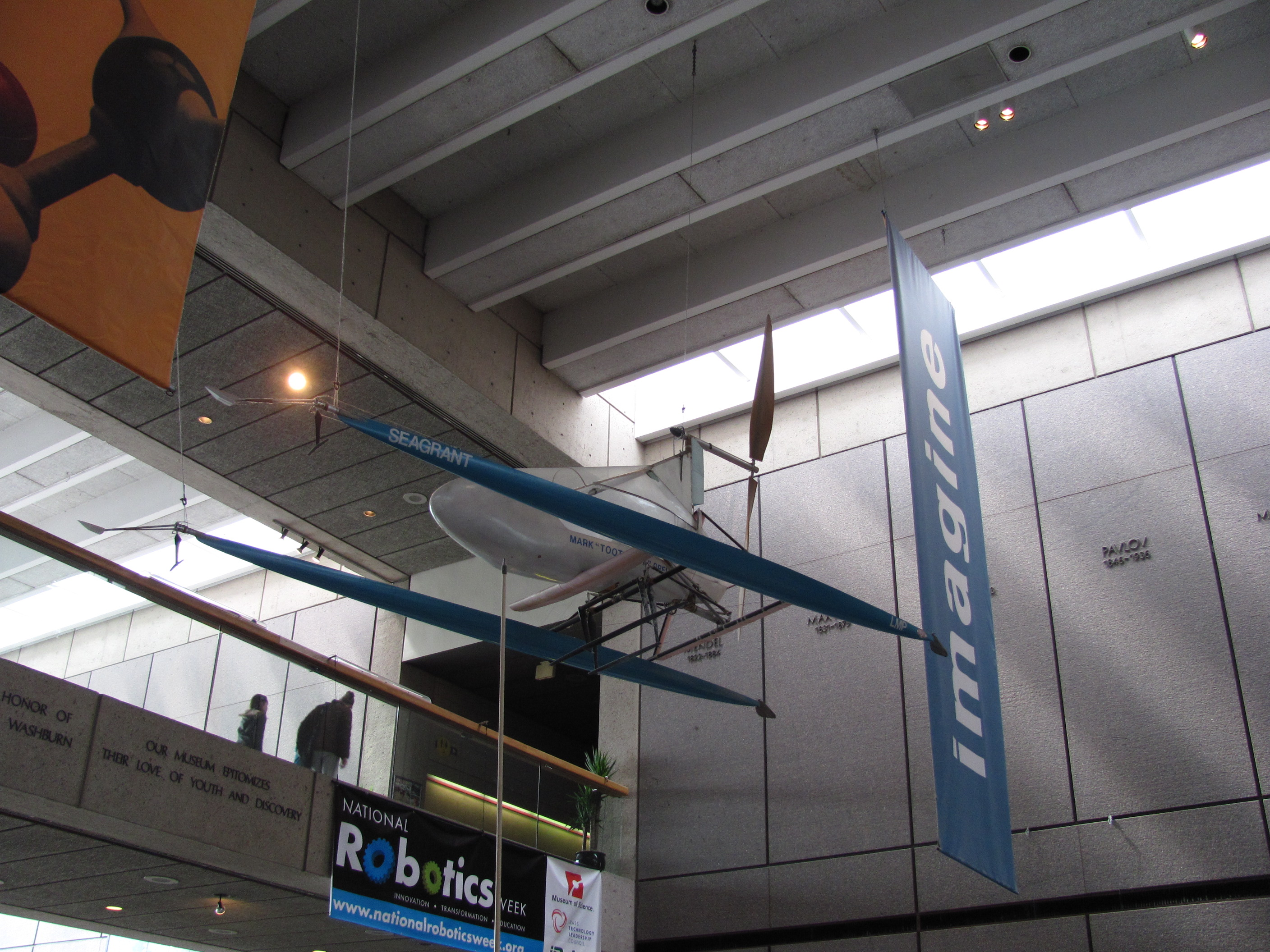
The Decavitator

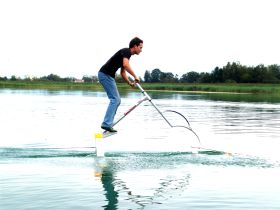
An AquaSkipper underway

A human-powered hydrofoil is a small hydrofoil watercraft propelled entirely by the muscle power of its operator(s). Hydrofoils are the fastest water-based vehicles propelled solely by human power. They can reach speeds of up to 34 km/h (21 mph; 18 kn), easily exceeding the world records set by competitive rowing which stand at about 20 km/h (12 mph; 11 kn). This speed advantage is achieved since hydrofoils lack a submerged body to provide buoyancy, greatly reducing the drag force.

== Propulsion ==
Means of propulsion include screw propellers, as in hydrocycles; aircraft propellers, as in the Decavitator; paddles, as in a Flyak; oars, as in the Yale hydrofoil sculling project; and flapping wings, as detailed below.

=== Flapping wing propulsion ===
Flapping wing propulsion devices are hydrofoils that produce propulsion by forcing a foil to move up and down in the water. The forward motion of the foil then generates lift as in other hydrofoils. A common design consists of a large foil at the stern that is used both for propulsion and keeping the passenger above the water, connected to a smaller foil at the bow used for steering and longitudinal stability. Riders operate the vehicle by bouncing up and down on a small platform at the stern, whilst holding onto a steering column. It is started and landed from the shore, or preferably from a dock, and requires a bit of experience. When moving too slowly, it will sink, and the range of possible speeds is 9–30 km/h (5.6–18.6 mph; 4.9–16.2 kn).

Several variations on the design have been developed:

- The Wasserläufer was a forerunner of the design developed in Germany during the 1950s.
- The Flying Fish was developed by Allan Abbott and Alec Brooks in 1984.
- The Pogofoil, with pontoons for flotation, was developed in the US in 1989.
- The Trampofoil was developed in Sweden in 1998.
- The AquaSkipper was developed the US in 2003.
- The Pumpabike was developed in South Africa in 2004.

== Electric assist hydrofoils ==
- The Manta5 Hydrofoiler XE-1 is a Hydrofoil electric bike developed in New Zealand in 2011 onwards, and released in January 2020.
- E-JetCycle
