= Hydrocycle =

Bicycle-like watercraft

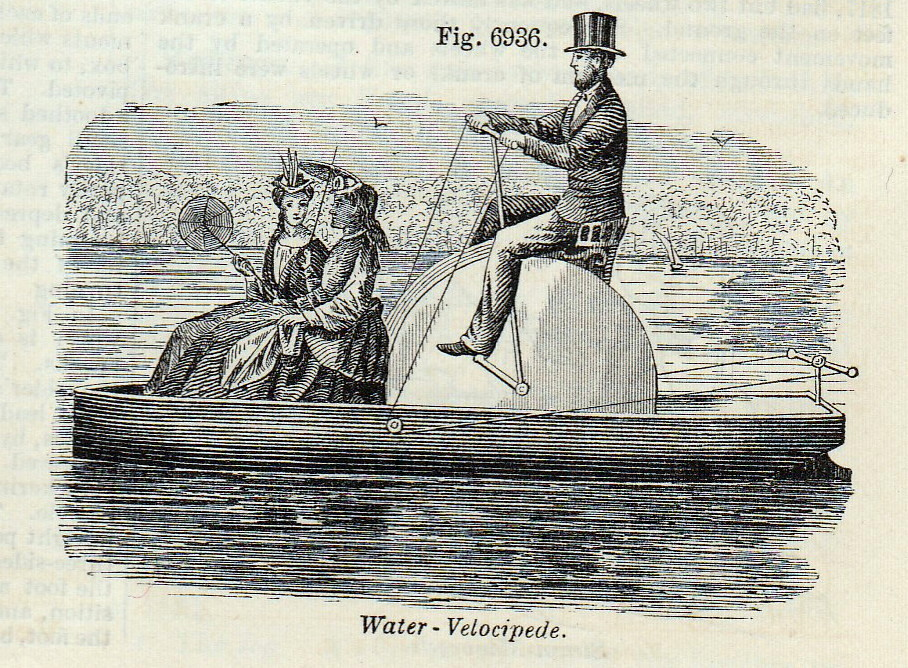
Water velocipede, c. 1877

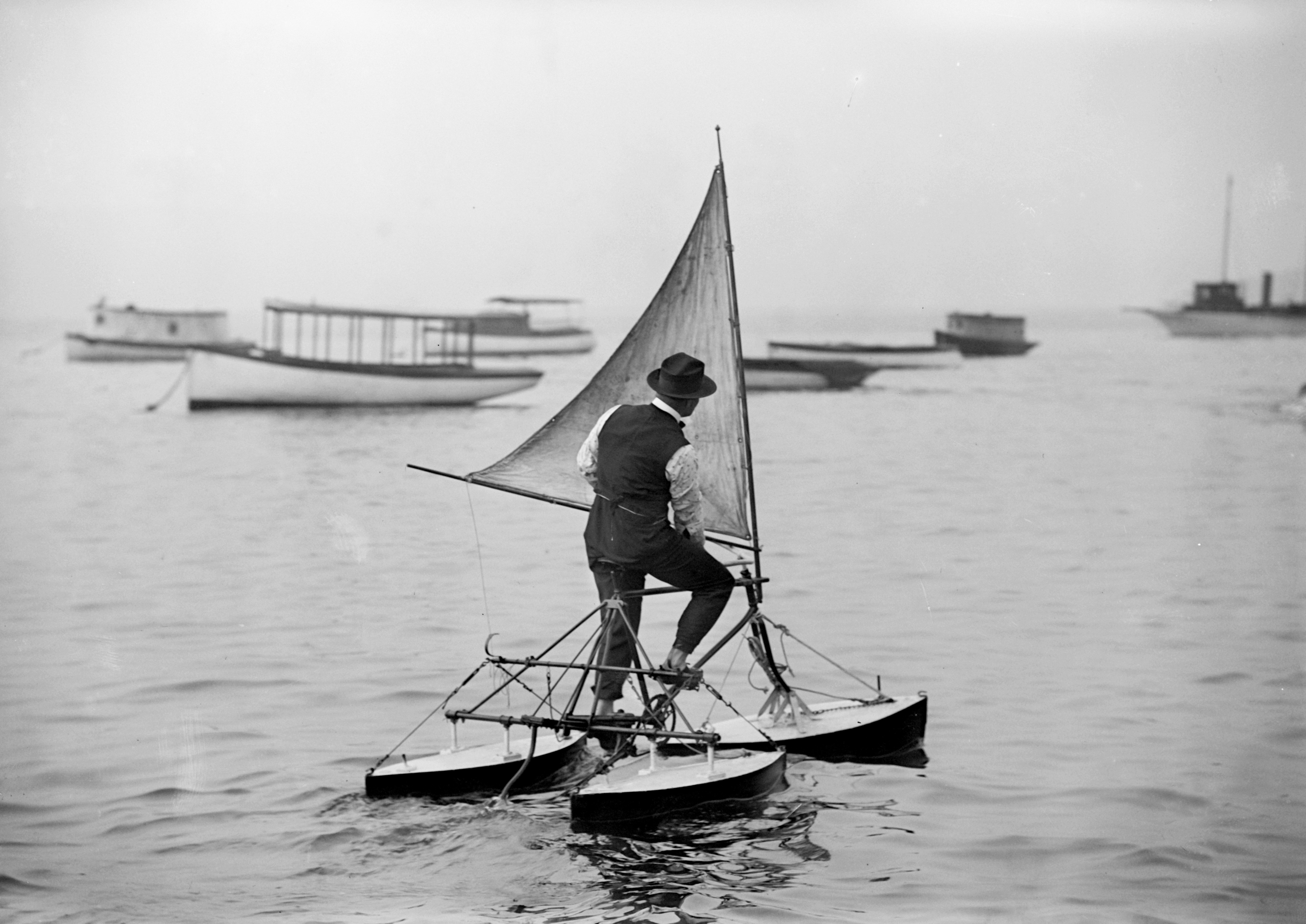
Man operating water tricycle, probably early 20th Century

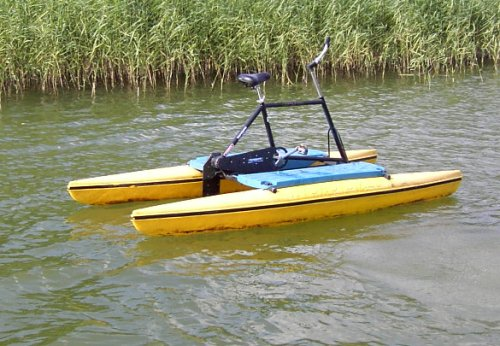
A Hydrobike brand hydrocycle

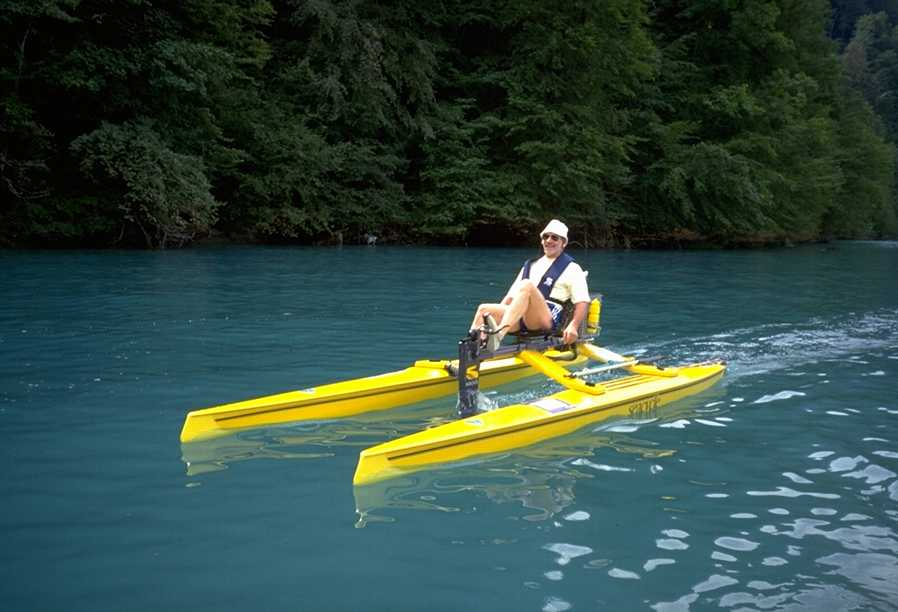
Modern pedal catamaran with propeller drive (Germany, 1999).

A hydrocycle is a bicycle-like watercraft. The concept was known in the 1870s as a water velocipede and the name was in use by the late 1890s.

Power is collected from the rider via a crank with pedals, as on a bicycle, and delivered to the water or the air via a propeller. Seating may be upright or recumbent, and multiple riders may be accommodated in tandem or side-by-side.

Buoyancy is provided by two or more pontoons or a single surfboard, and some have hydrofoils that can lift the flotation devices out of the water.

Brands include Seacycle, Hydrobike, Water Bike, Seahorse (Cross Trek), and itBike. Kits exist to temporarily convert an existing bicycle into a hydrocycle.

== See also ==
- Human-powered watercraft
- List of solar-powered boats
- Pedalo
