= Pedalo =

Small pedal-powered recreational boat

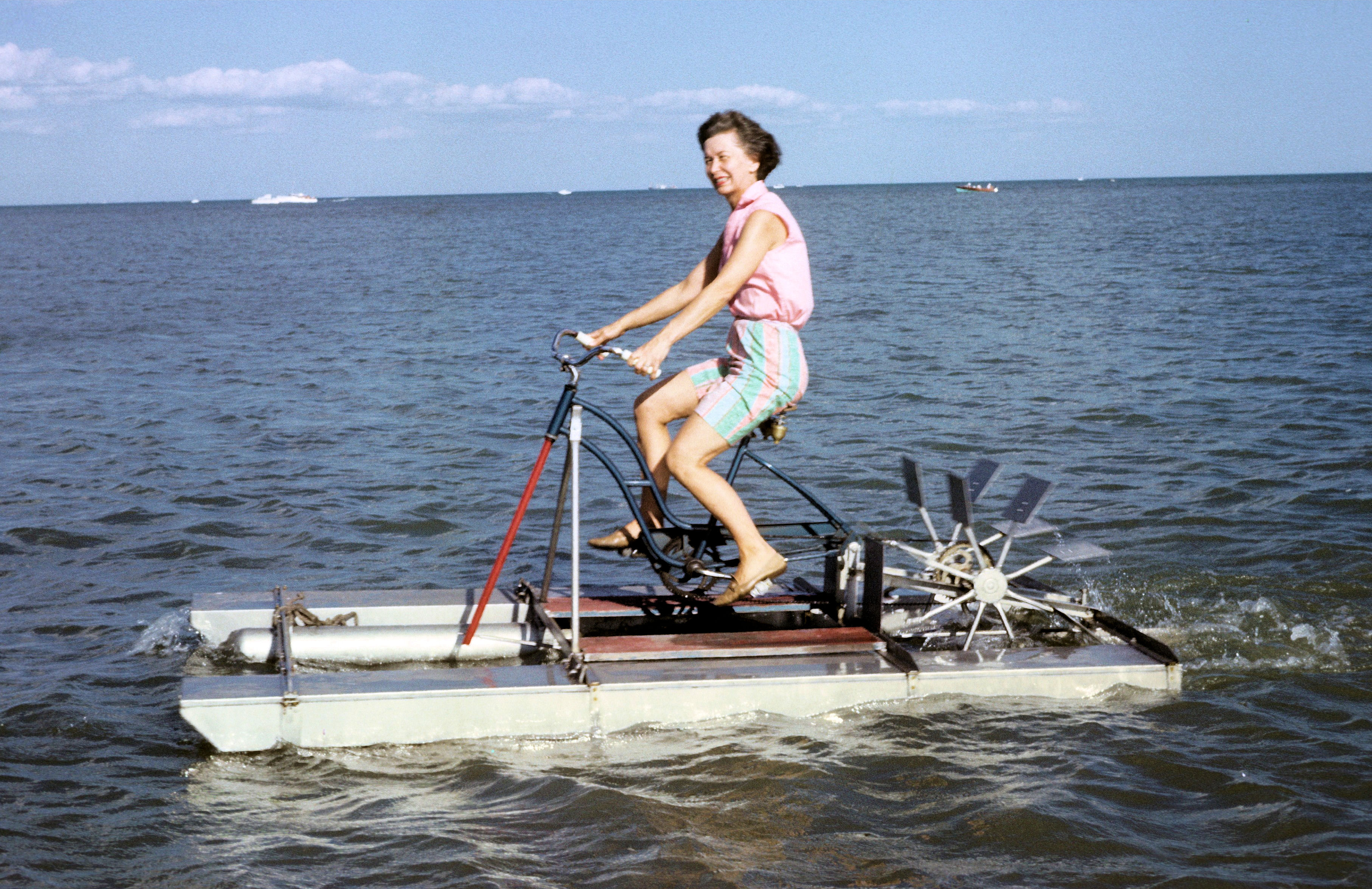
Water bike on Lake St. Clair (Michigan)

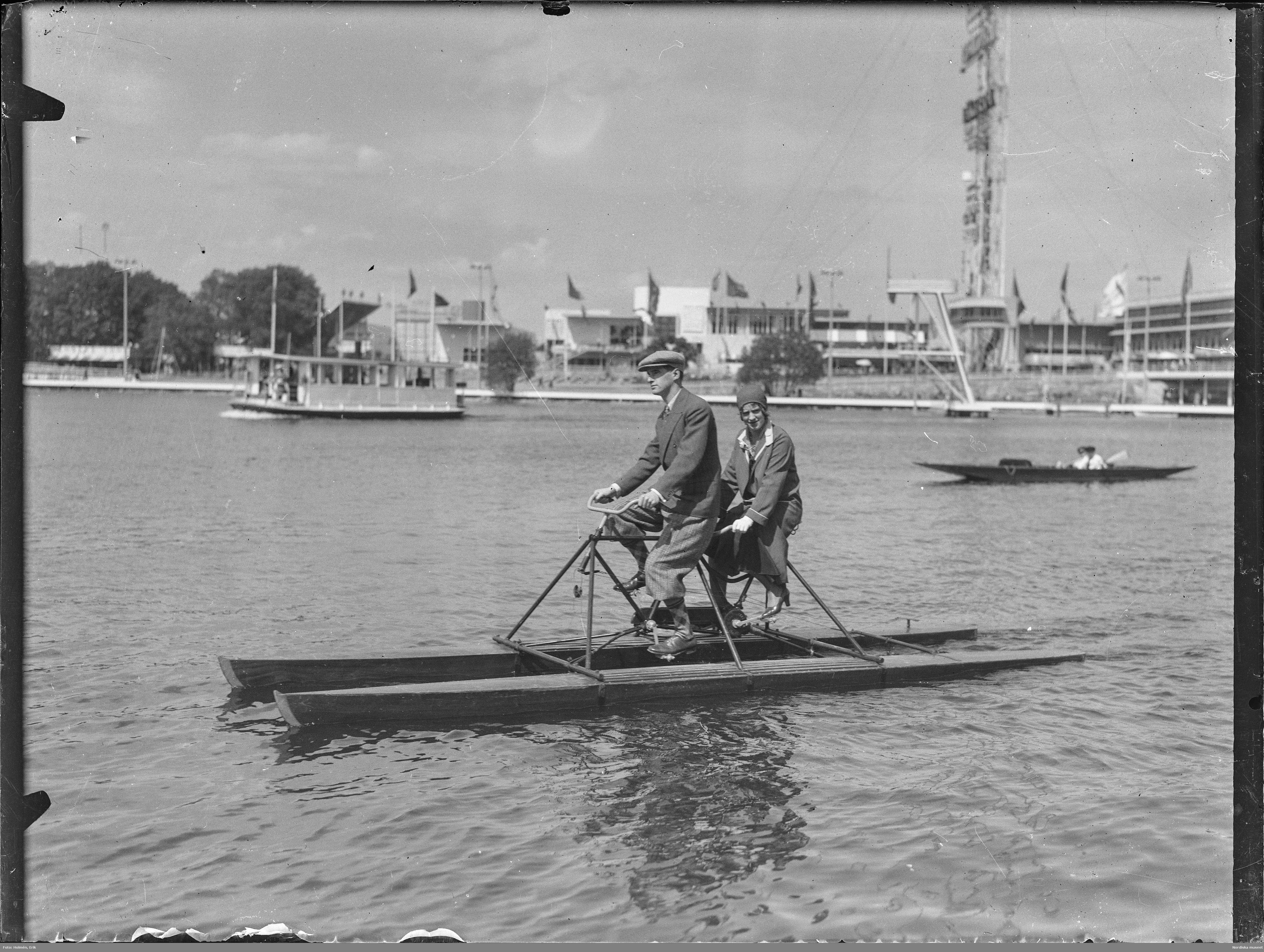
Pedalo at the Stockholm Exhibition of 1930

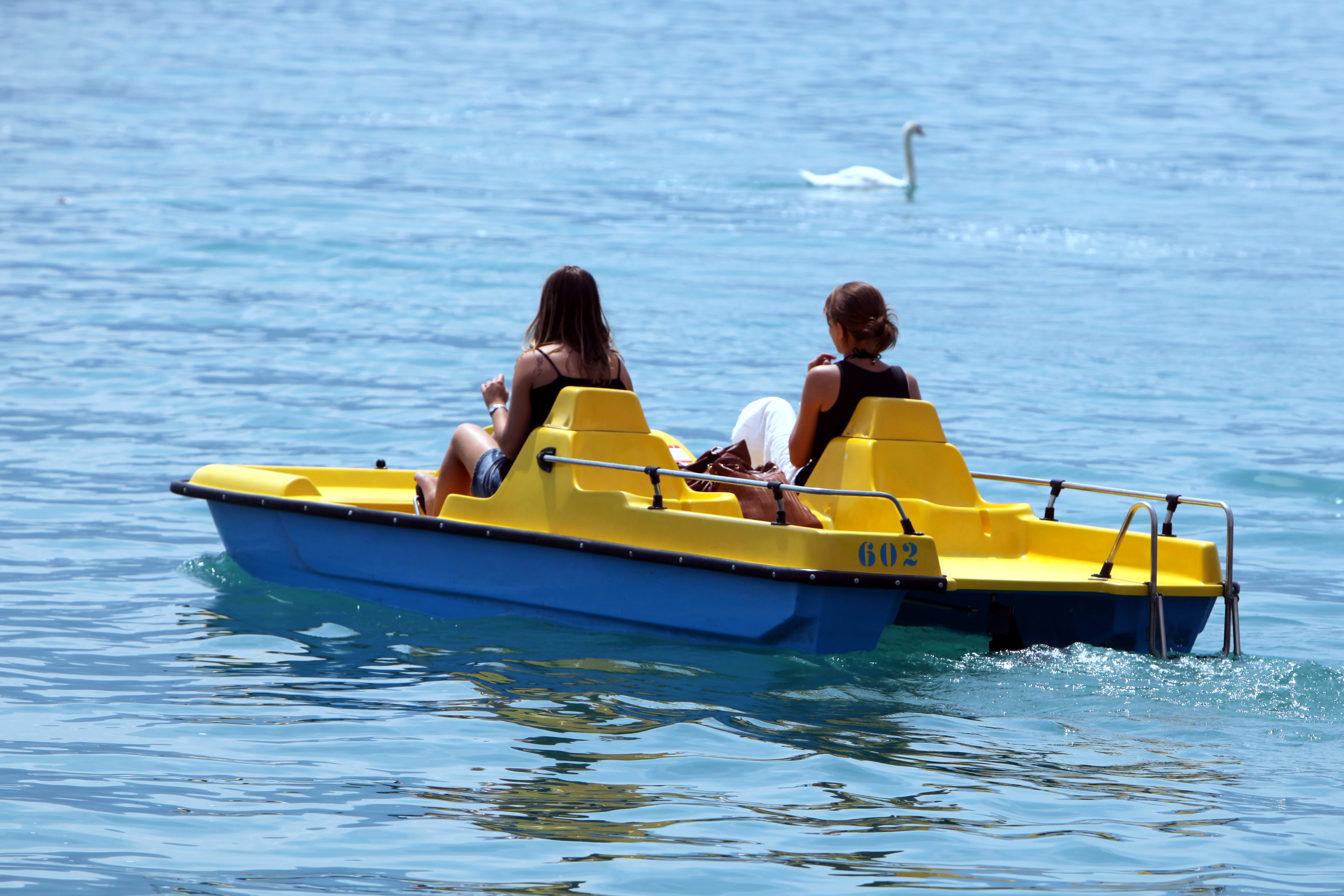
A paddle boat on Geneva Lake (Wisconsin).

Boats in Japan celebrating spring with a swan pedalo accidentally running into a row boat, 2022

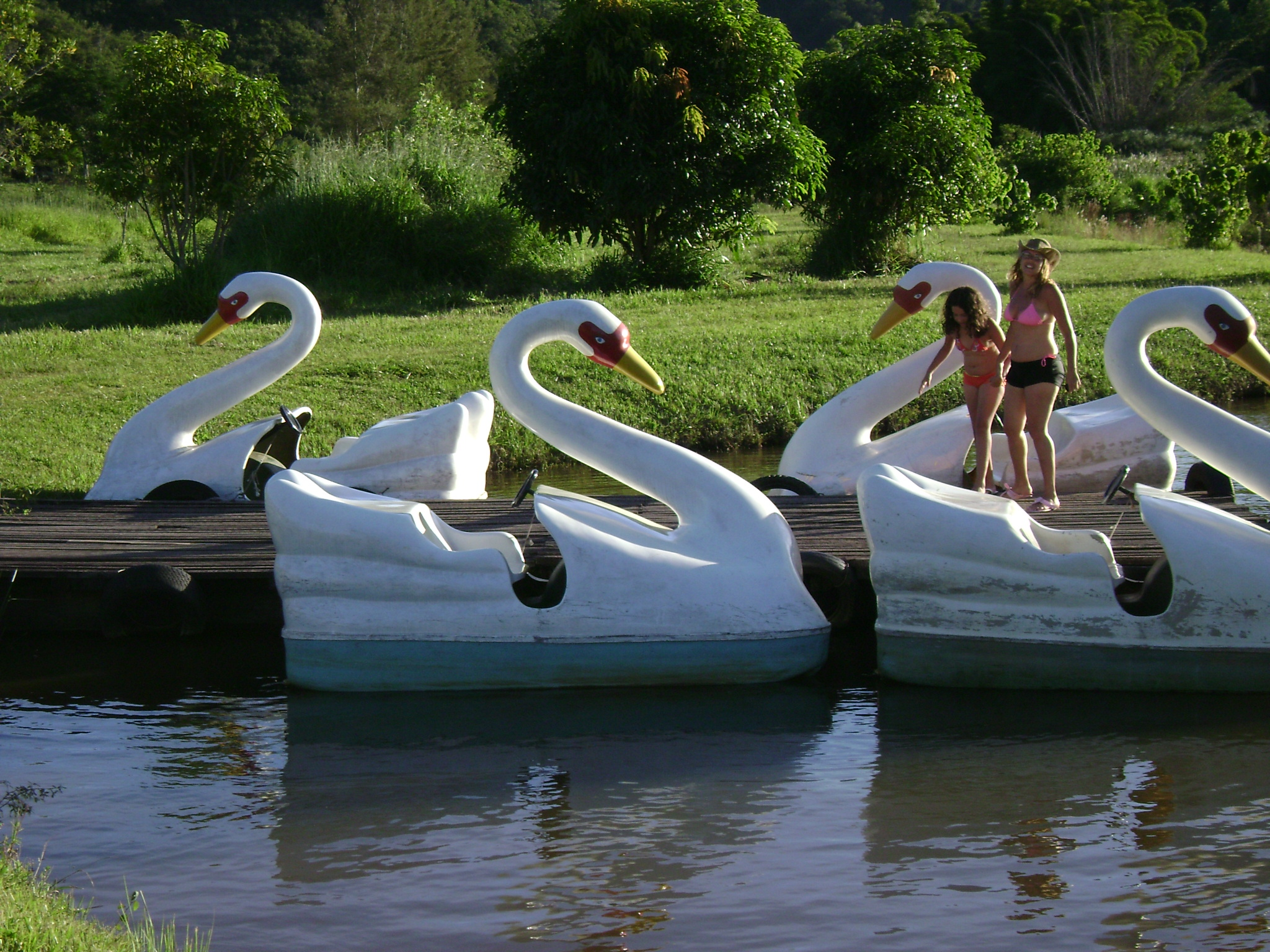
Pedalos in Brazil (called pedalinhos)

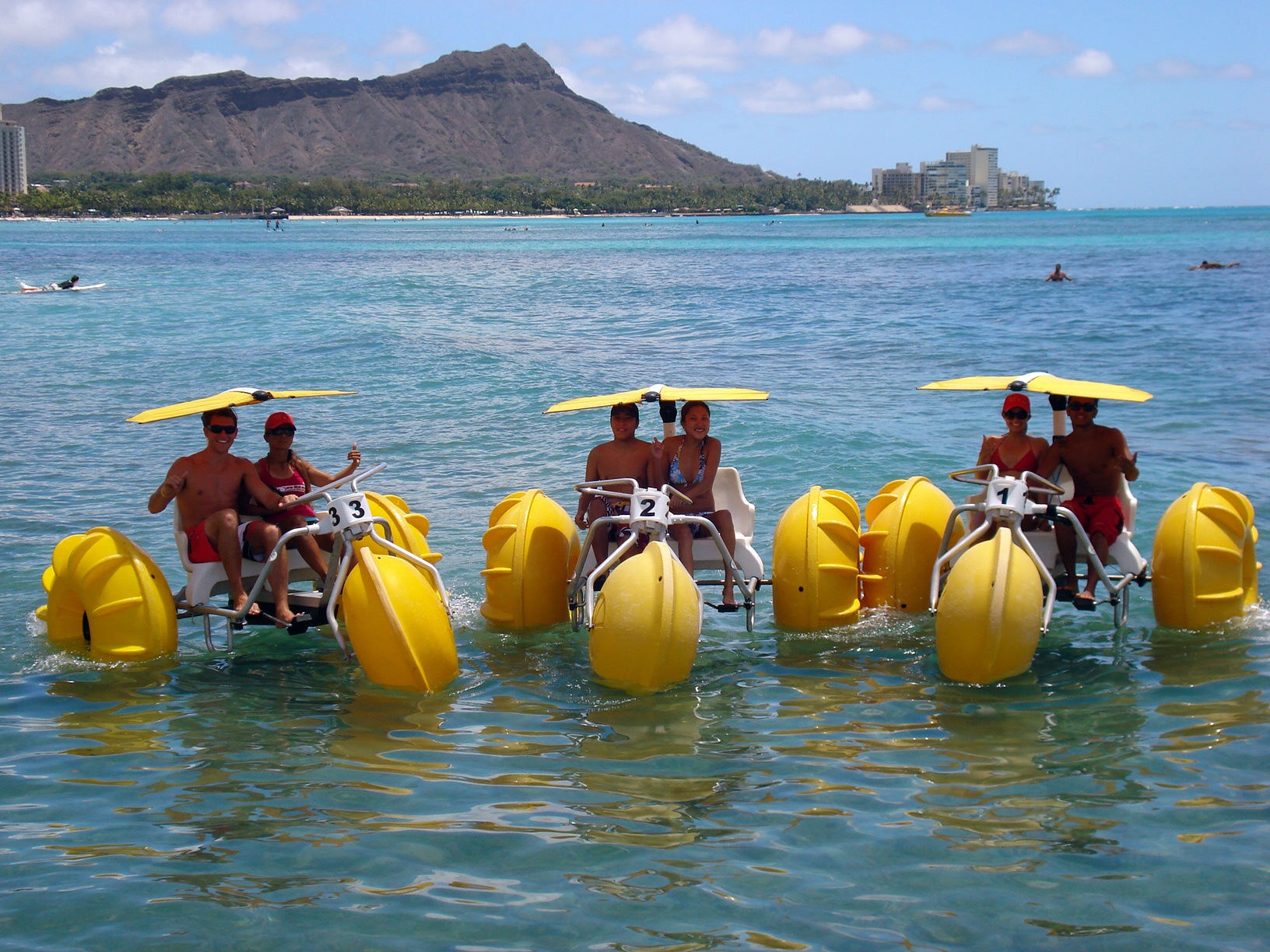
Human-powered watercraft: aqua-cycle water trikes in the Pacific Ocean with Diamond Head, Hawaii in the background

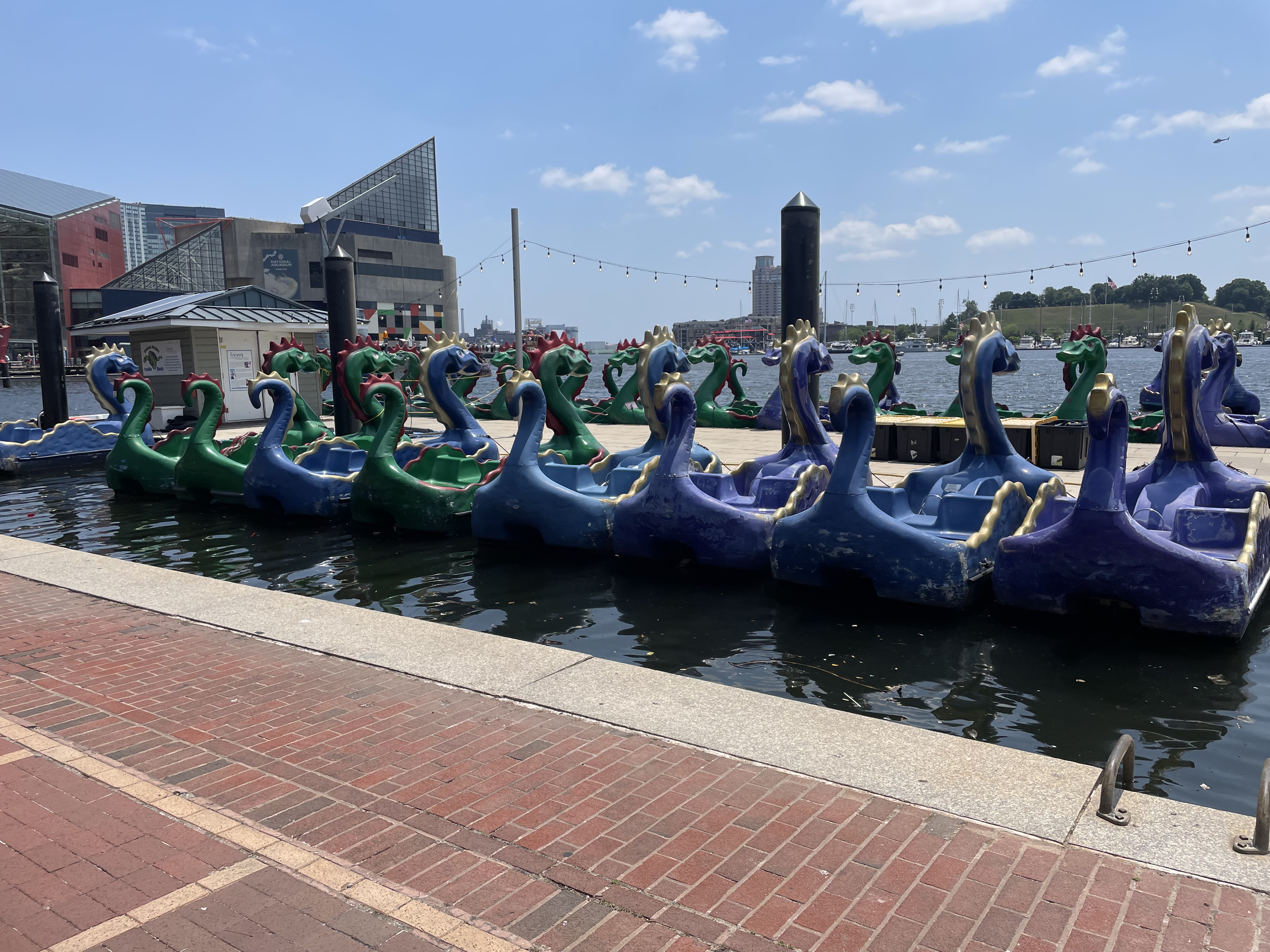
Paddle boats on the Inner Harbor in Baltimore

A pedalo (British English), pedal boat (U.S. English), or paddle boat (U.S., Canadian, and Australian English) is a human-powered watercraft propelled by the action of pedals turning a paddle wheel.

== Description ==
A pedalo is a human-powered watercraft propelled by the turning of a paddle wheel. The wheel is turned by people operating the pedals of the craft. The paddle wheel of a pedalo is a smaller version of that used by a paddle steamer.

== Use ==
Pedalos, being particularly suited to calm waters, are often hired out for use on ponds and small lakes in urban parks, as well as in beaches when the weather allows.

== Designs ==
The earliest record of a pedalo is perhaps Leonardo da Vinci's diagram of a craft driven by two pedals.

Typically, a two-seat pedalo has two sets of pedals side-by-side, designed to be used together. Some models, however, have three pedals on each side, to allow a person boating alone to pedal from a centrally seated position.
