= VFW-Fokker FK-3 =

German single-seat glider, 1968

FK-3
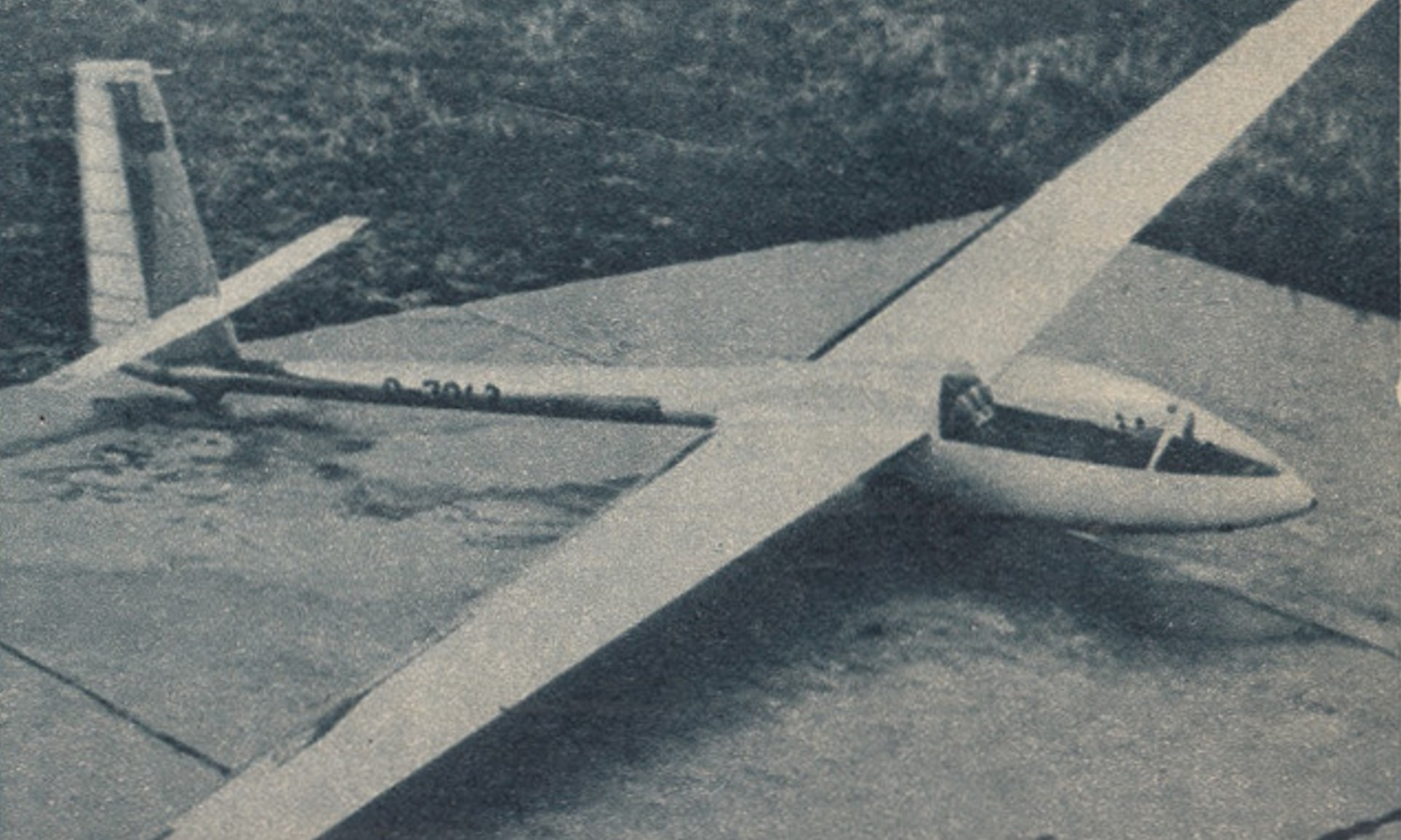

General information
- Type: Open class competition sailplane
- National origin: West Germany
- Manufacturer: VFW-Fokker GmbH
- Designer: Otto Funk
- Number built: c.13

History
- First flight: 24 April 1968

The VFW-Fokker FK-3 is a single seat competition glider, built in Germany in the late 1960s. It had success at the Italian and Austrian national contests of 1968, resulting in a short production run the following year.

== Design and development ==
The FK-3 was designed by Otto Funk to be a high performance sailplane, particularly suited to weak thermal conditions but also easy to fly. It is a largely metal pod and boom aircraft, with cantilever shoulder wings. The wing has a thickness/chord ratio of 15.3% and a simple straight tapered plan with square tips, built around a single spar. It made use of plastic foams, both in the light alloy-foam sandwich ribs and with a rigid foam honeycomb structure between the ribs to support the 0.50 mm (0.020 in) skin. The whole trailing edge is filled with control surfaces; inboard of the ailerons there are camber changing flaps divided into two parts, the inner section deflecting through greater angles than the outer. Schempp-Hirth airbrakes are fitted at inboard at mid-chord, opening above and below the wing. The wings also contain rubber bags to hold up to 50 kg (110 lb) of water ballast, with a dump valve in the fuselage behind the undercarriage monowheel.

The pod of the forward fuselage is a steel tube structure, clad in a glass fibre shell which ends just aft of the trailing edge. The pilot sits in a semi-reclining position ahead of the leading edge, under a long perspex canopy. This is removable and reaches almost to the nose, where there is a small, fixed windscreen. Behind the wing the tail boom is a slender, riveted light alloy tube that bolts to the steel tubing of the pod. The tail is conventional, though the straight tapered, square tipped fin and rudder are noticeably tall, with the similarly shaped tailplane and elevators mounted a little way above the boom. The tail surfaces, with the exception of the fabric covered rudder, follow the wing construction. The landing gear consists of a monowheel, fitted with a drum brake and manually retractable into the fuselage where it is enclosed above two doors, assisted by a fixed tailwheel.

The FK-3 was built by apprentices at the VFW (Vereinigte Flugtechnische Werke) German factory at Speyer and flew for the first time on 24 April 1968. It had immediate success at the national championship level: the prototype won the 1968 Italian contest and in the same year two FK-3s became winner and runner-up at the Austrian competition. Production began in January 1969 at the rate of about one a week. Some sources suggest that eleven examples were built. Three remained on the German civil aircraft register in 2010.

== Variants ==
RFB Sirius
One FK-3 was converted in 1969 by Rhein-Flugzeugbau (RFB) into a motor glider powered by an eight bladed ducted fan built into the rear of the pod, with its direct drive engine immediately ahead. Initially a 36 kW (48 hp) flat four, air-cooled Nelson two stroke engine was fitted, but this was subsequently replaced first by a pair of Yamaha motor-cycle engines, then by two Fichtel and Sachs Wankel engines, each producing 15 kW (20 hp). It began a series of developments by RFB of the fuselage mounted ducted fan concept, through the Sirius II to the 1977 Fantrainer.

== Specifications ==
Data from Jane's World Sailplanes and Motor Gliders, p.112

General characteristics

- Capacity: One
- Length: 7.2 m (23 ft 7 in)
- Wingspan: 17.4 m (57 ft 1 in)
- Height: 1.80 m (5 ft 11 in)
- Wing area: 13.8 m^{2} (149 sq ft)
- Aspect ratio: 22.0
- Airfoil: Wortmann FX-62-K-153
- Empty weight: 240 kg (529 lb)
- Max takeoff weight: 400 kg (882 lb) including water ballst

Performance

- Maximum speed: 270 km/h (170 mph, 150 kn)
- Stall speed: 53 km/h (33 mph, 29 kn)
- Maximum glide ratio: best, 42 at 88 km/h (55 mph; 48 kn)
- Rate of sink: 0.5 m/s (98 ft/min) minimum at 64 km/h (40 mph; 35 kn)
- Wing loading: 29.0 kg/m^{2} (5.9 lb/sq ft)
