= Aviation Museum Hannover-Laatzen =

Coordinates: 52°19′20″N 9°47′30″E

Luftfahrtmuseum Hannover-Laatzen Aviation Museum Hannover-Laatzen
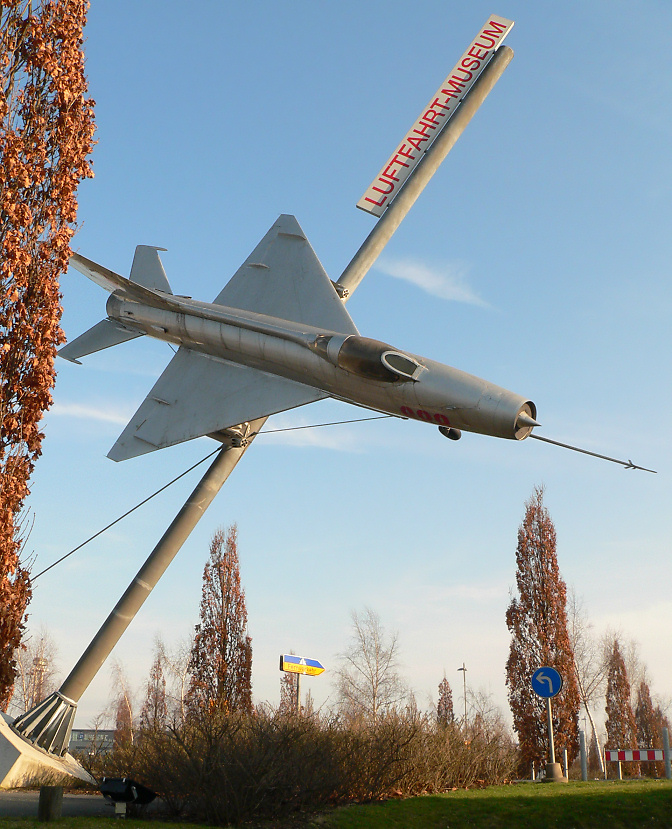
- A MiG-21 displayed outside the museum
- Location: Hanover-Laatzen, Germany
- Type: Aviation Museum
- Website: www.luftfahrtmuseum-hannover.de

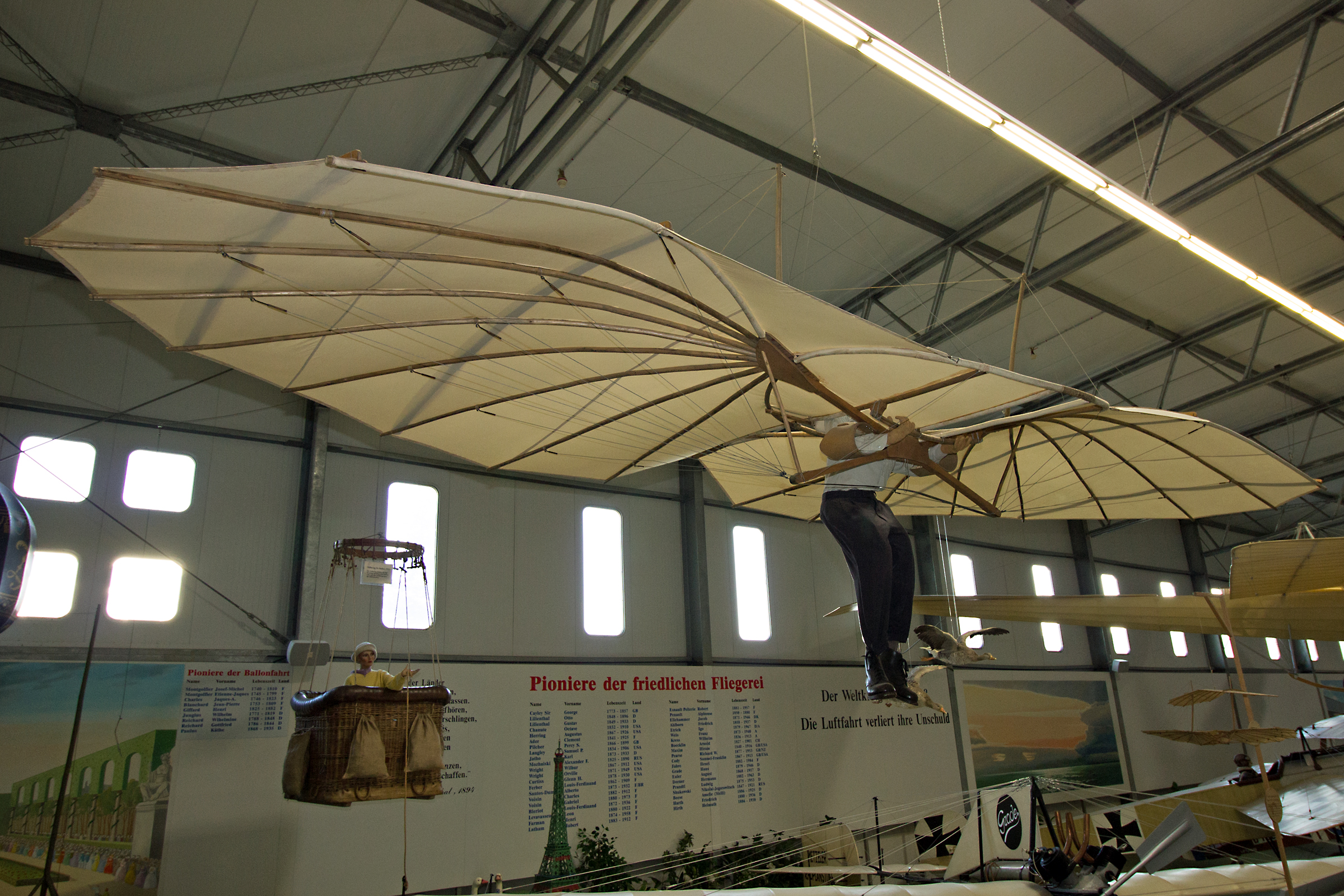
Beginning of Aviation: Lilienthal´s Glider

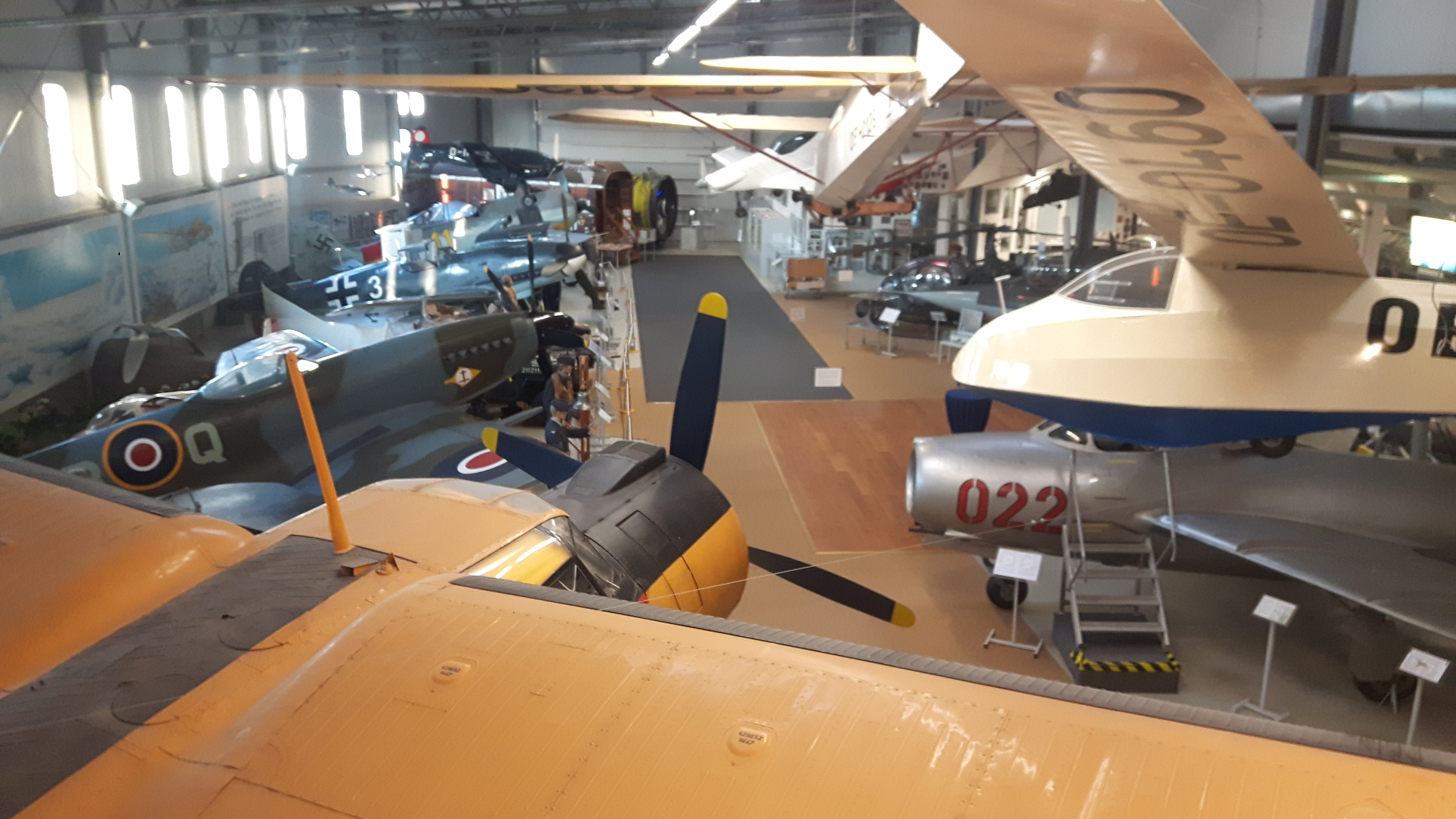
An-2 from above

The Aviation Museum Hannover-Laatzen (German: Luftfahrtmuseum Hannover-Laatzen) is a permanent exhibition in Laatzen of the history of aviation. 38 airplanes, 800 aircraft models, and more than 30 aircraft engines are displayed on 3,500 m^{2} (38,000 sq ft).

Among the vast array of exhibits one can find an original Jumo 004A, one of the first jet engines in history, as well as a Focke-Wulf Fw 190, a Messerschmitt Bf 109 and a Supermarine Spitfire. Aircraft from the postwar era include a MiG-15, an F-104 and an An-2.

== History ==
The entrepreneur Günter Leonhardt was already interested in gliding as a teenager and volunteered for the Luftwaffe. After the Second World War, Leonhardt created the Nelke shipping company, together with the businessman Karl Nelke. His passion was aviation, and he built a large private collection. For this he rescued several Ju 52 from a Norwegian lake in the Arctic Circle, which had sunk there in 1940. In 1992, he partially transferred his collection to the Aviation Museum Laatzen-Hannover, located on the premises of the company he by then owned. The company Nelke was sold in 1994.

On 11 April 2013, the Aviation Museum Laatzen-Hannover, the Aeronauticum in Nordholz, the Helicopter Museum Bückeburg and the Ju 52 Museum in Wunstorf have joined together to form the "Association of Aviation Museums of Lower Saxony" ("Arbeitsgemeinschaft Niedersächsischer Luftfahrtmuseen").

== Exhibits ==
Exhibits include civilian and military aircraft. In addition to the aircraft collection are numerous items of everyday use, such as vehicles and clothing. Further emphasis is set on: the early days of aviation, daring pilots, the salvage of the Ju 52 in the Arctic Circle, the history of gliding and women in aviation. Exhibits are mostly arranged in chronological order, starting with the birth of aviation and ending with modern civil aviation.

=== Airplanes ===
- Antonov An-2
- Dornier Do 28 D-2
- Filter Schwan I
- Focke-Wulf Fw 44 Stieglitz
- Focke-Wulf Fw 190 A-8
- Fokker Dr.I, replica
- Fokker E.III, replica
- Grade Eindecker, replica
- HFB 320 Hansa Jet
- Horväth III, replica
- Ikarus Windspiel 2
- Junkers F 13 a, replica
- Klemm L 25 D
- Lilienthal Normalsegelapparat, replica
- Lockheed F-104 Starfighter
- Messerschmitt Bf 109 G-2
- Mikoyan-Gurevich MiG-15
- Mikoyan-Gurevich MiG-21 (as Signpost)
- Nieuport 17, replica
- Piaggio P.149 D
- Rheinflug RW-3b
- Rieseler R III/22, replica
- Ryan M-2 NYP Spirit of St. Louis, replica
- Scheibe L-Spatz 55
- Schneider Grunau Baby II
- DFS SG 38 Schulgleiter Two seater glider
- Sopwith Camel, replica
- Stampe SV-4c
- Supermarine Spitfire Mk.XIV
- Tipsy Nipper
- Ultralight-Aircraft A. K. Meyer FFB I Flamingo
- Yakovlev Yak-18

=== Helicopters ===
- Aérospatiale Alouette II

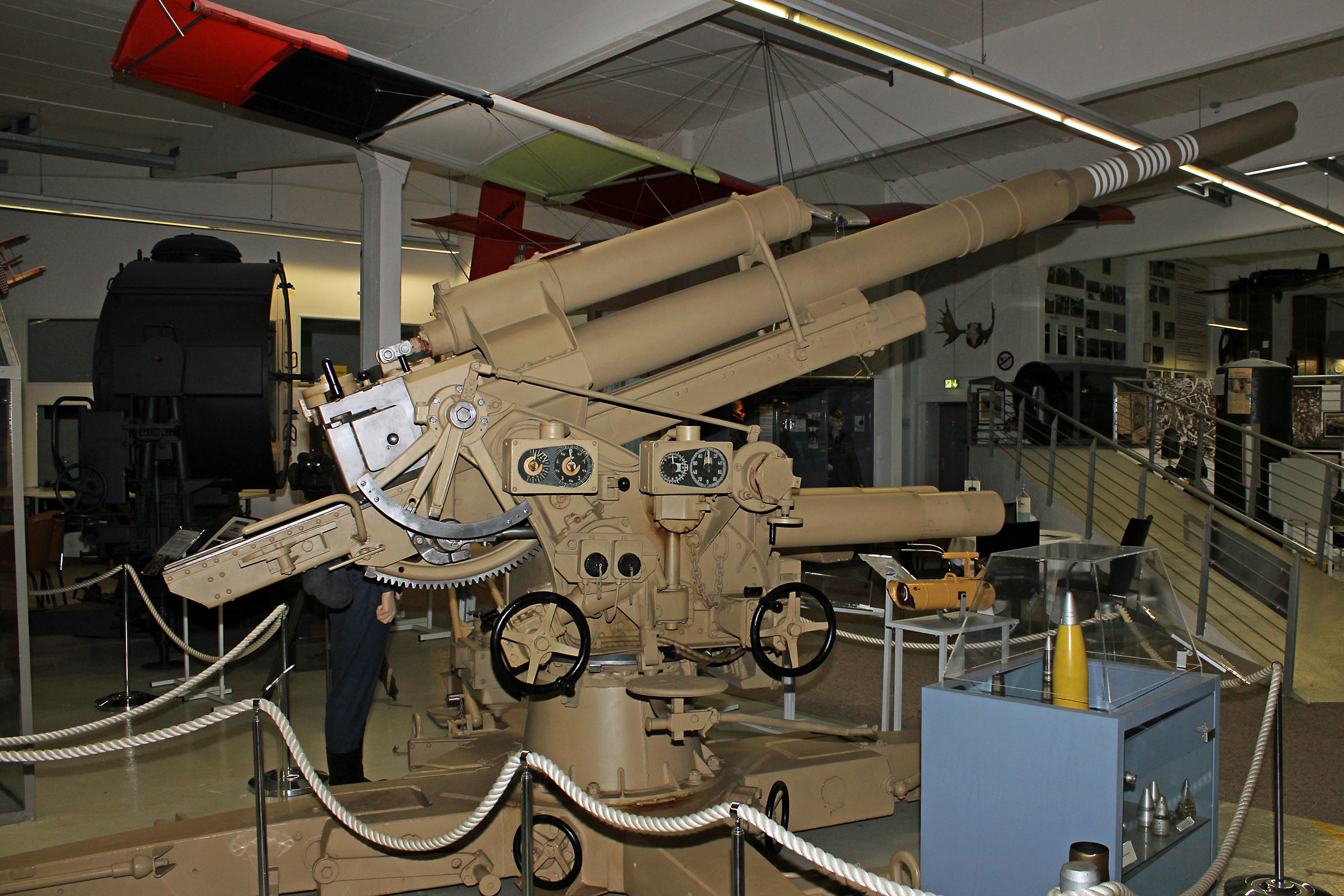
8,8-cm-FlaK 36 Anti-Aircraft Gun

=== Other ===
- Equipment for pilots
- Junkers Ju 52/3m fuselage
- Flugmotoren und Triebwerke
- WWII Anti-Aircraft Gun
- Instrument Panels and Equipment
- Various aircraft models

== Gallery of museum exhibits ==
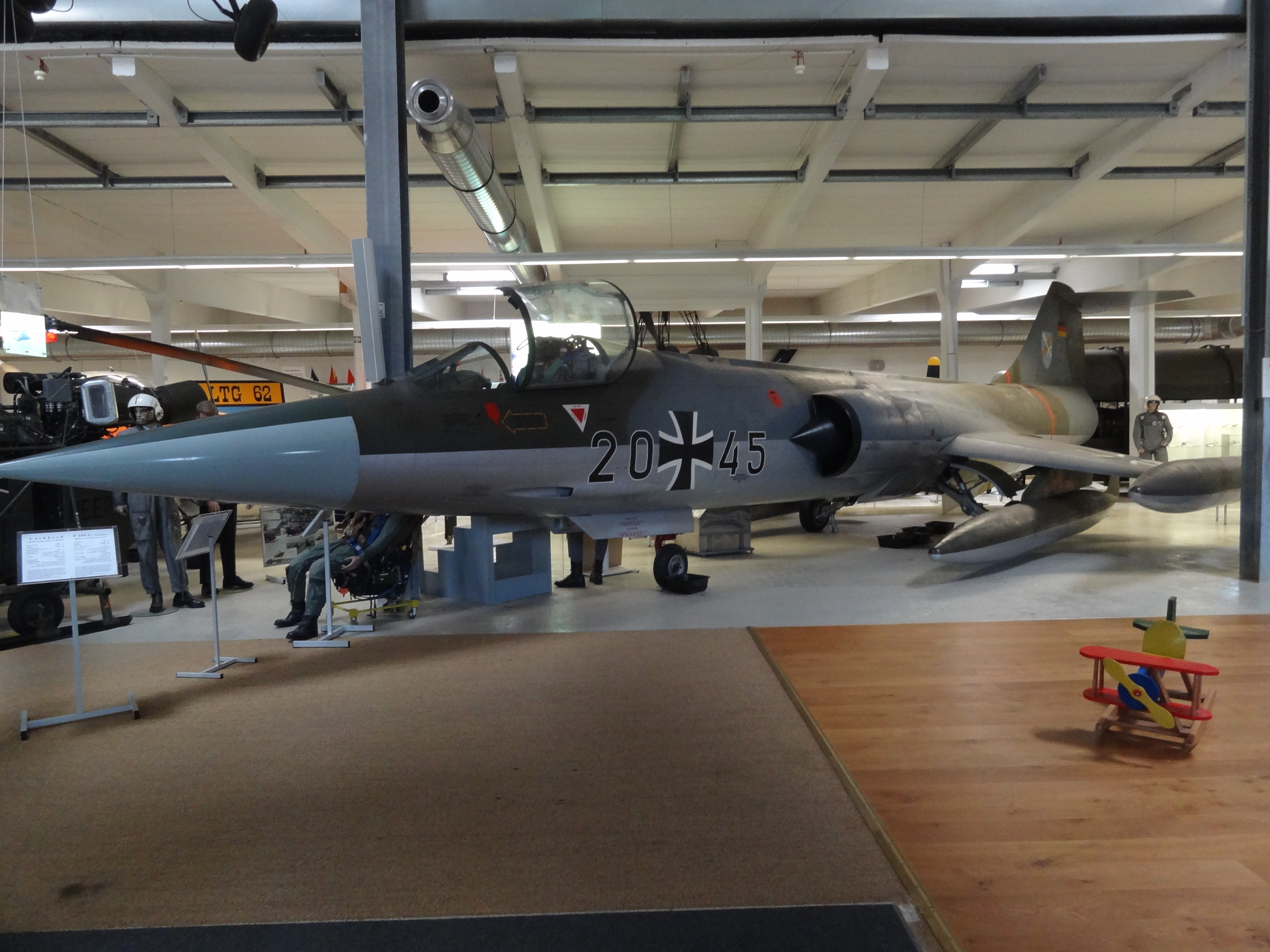
F-104 Starfighter

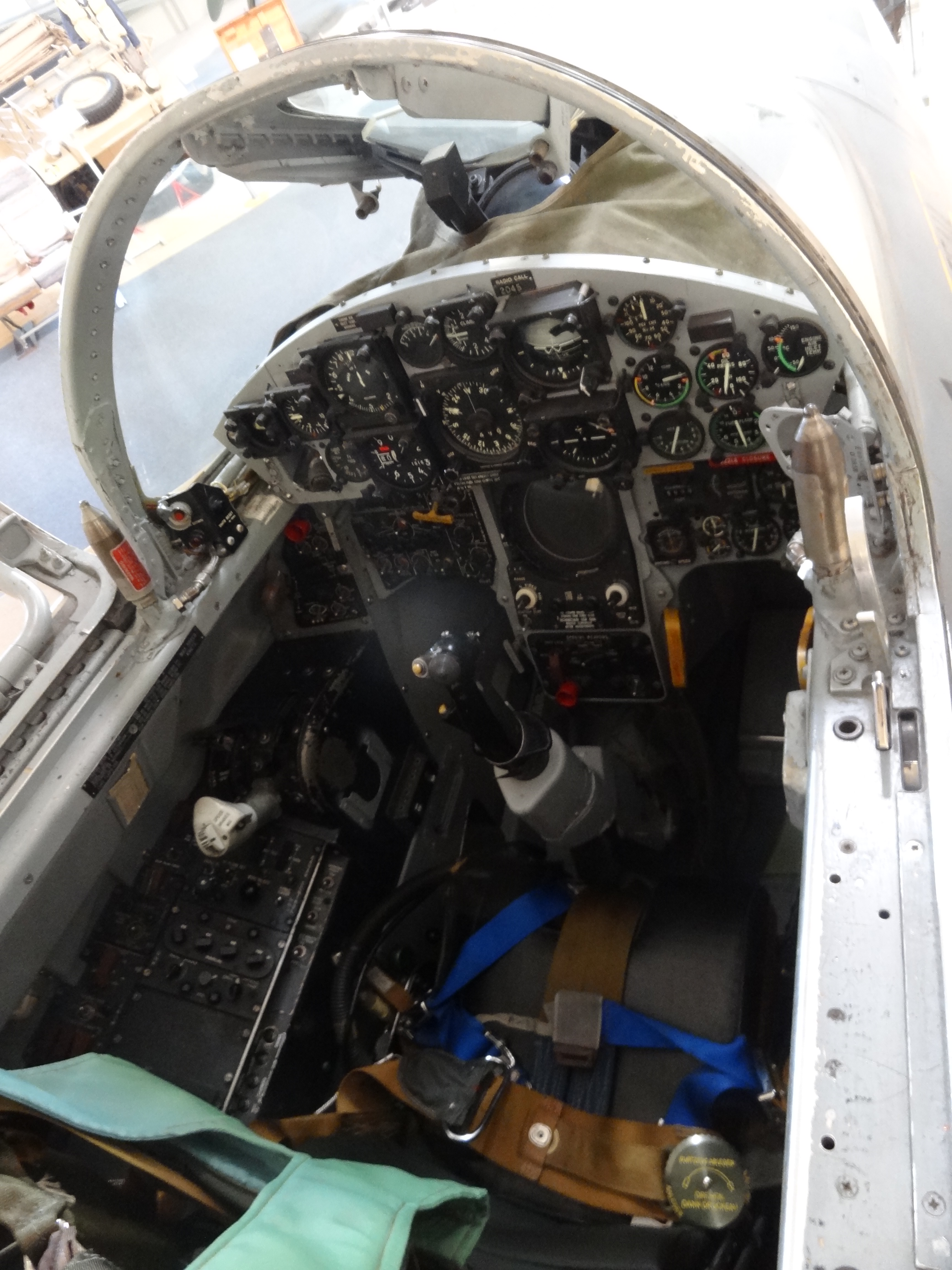
F-104 cockpit

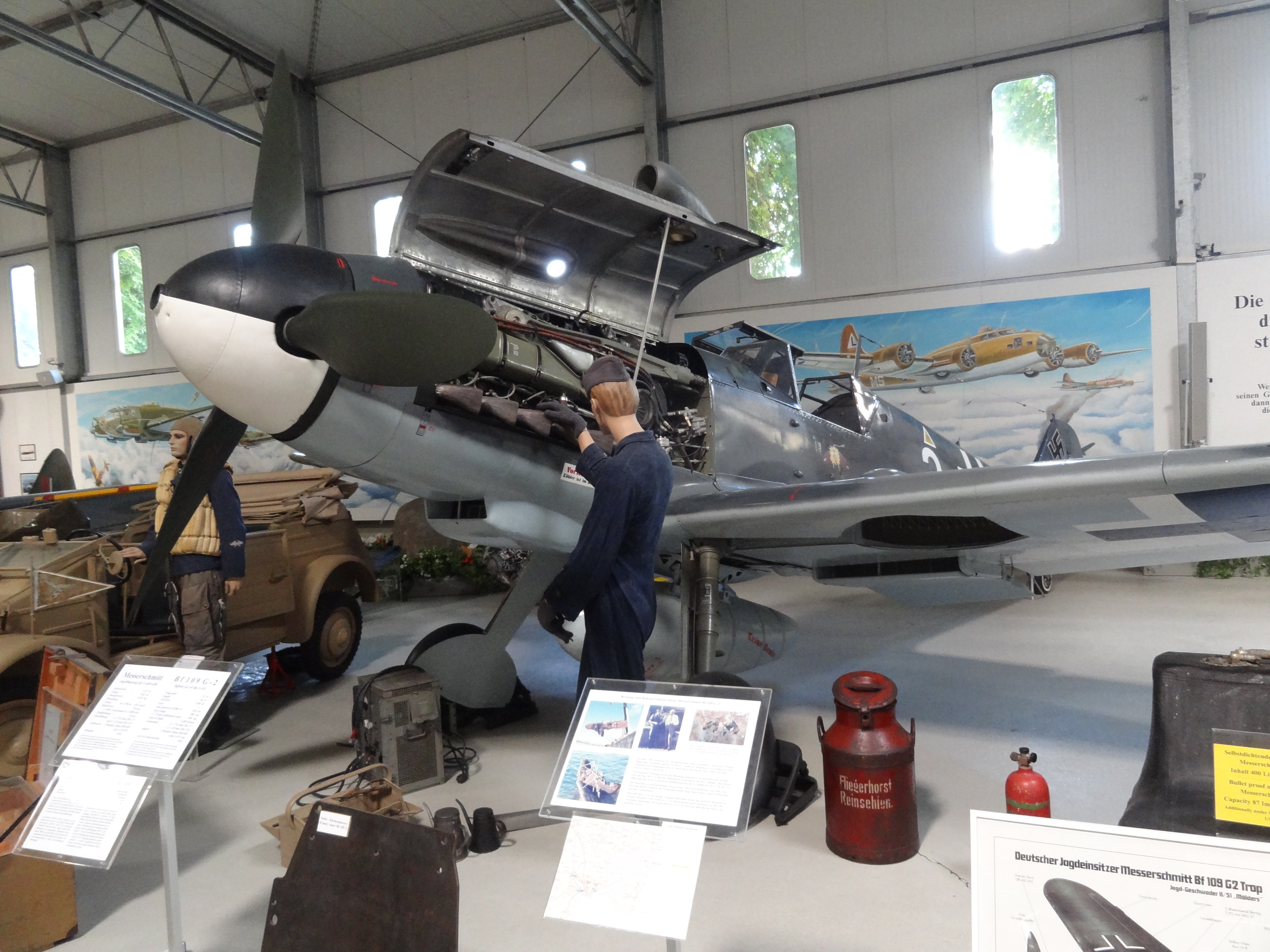
Messerschmitt Bf 109 G-2

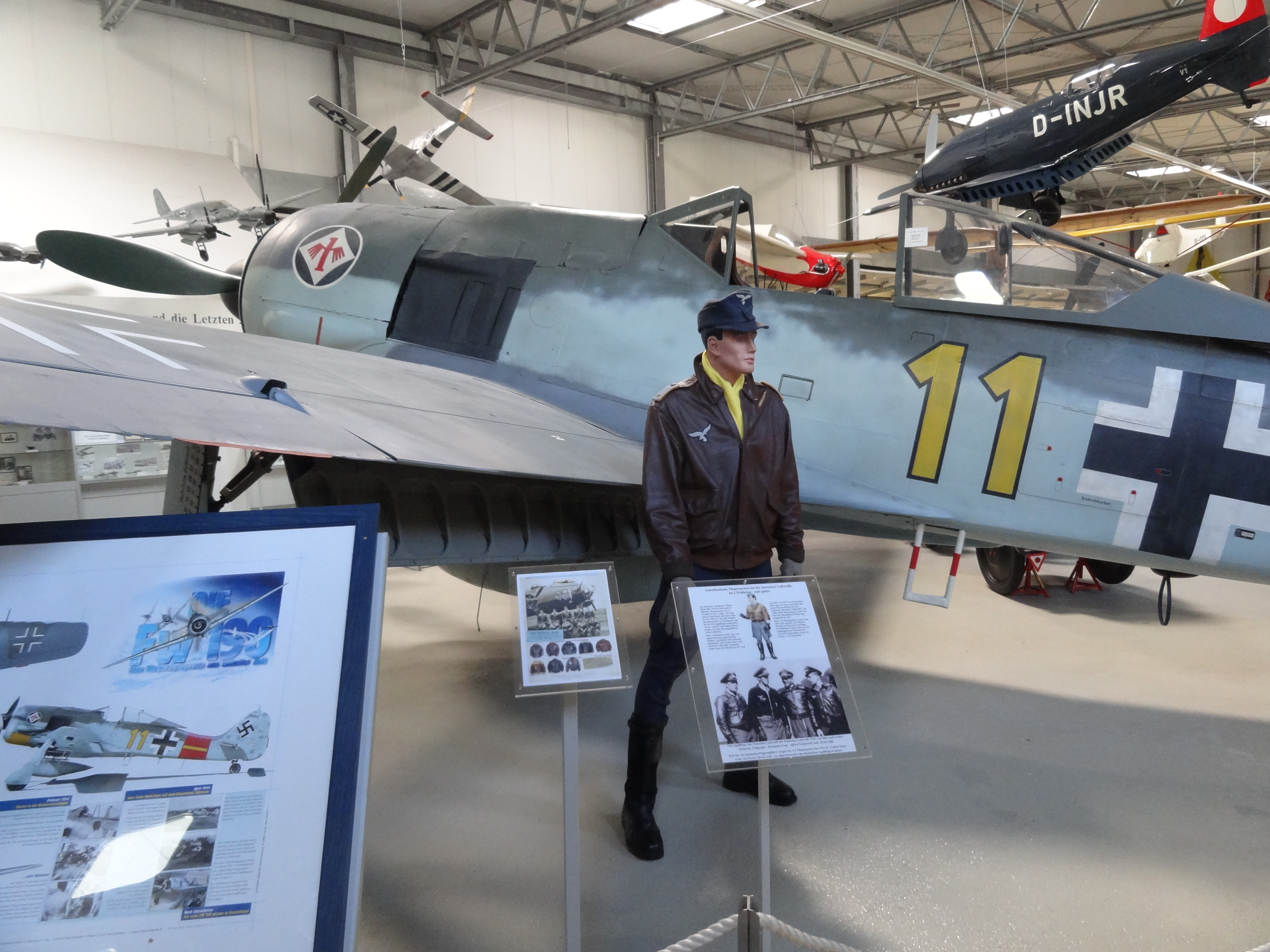
Focke-Wulf Fw 190 A-8

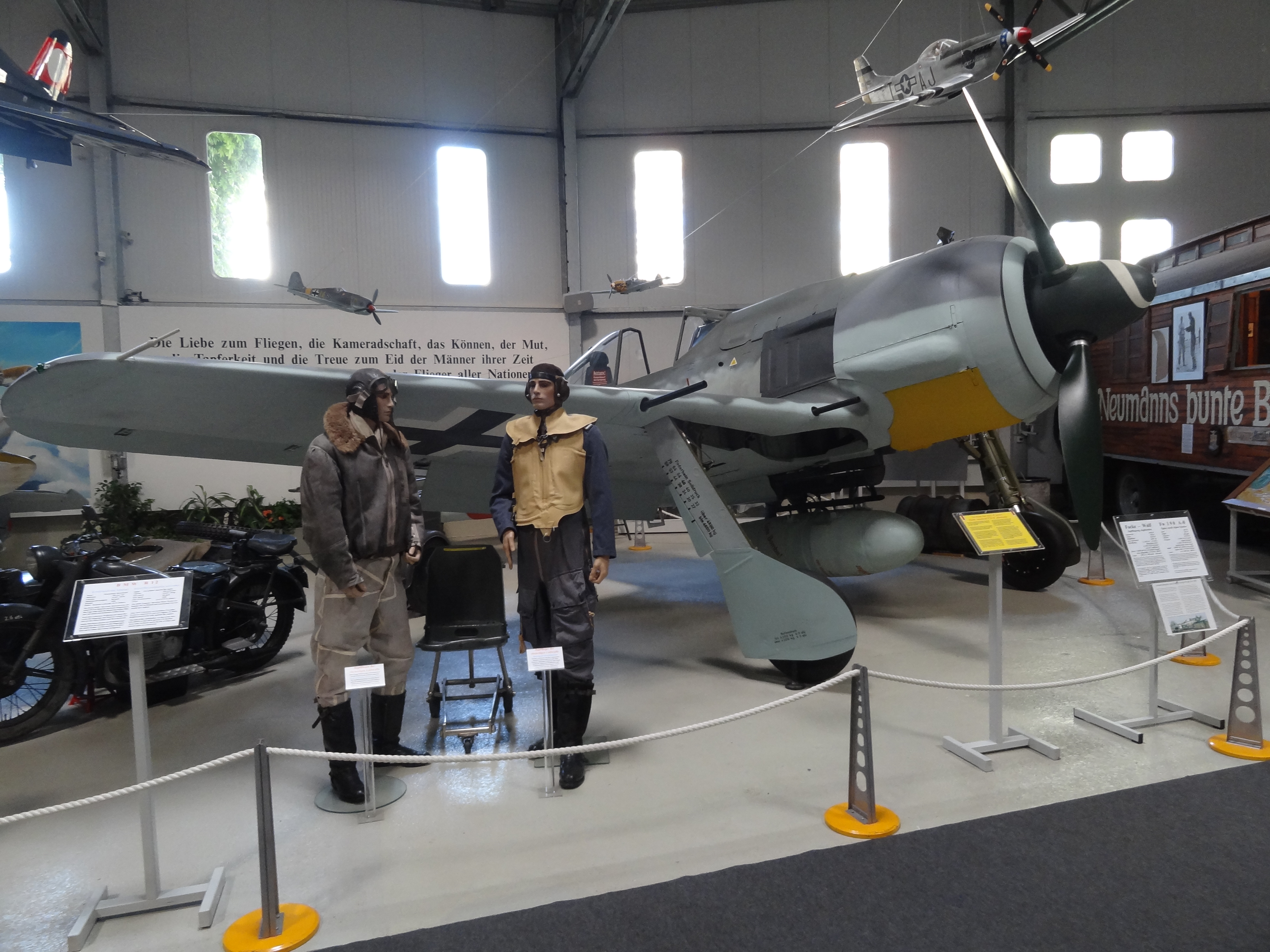
Fw 190 A-8

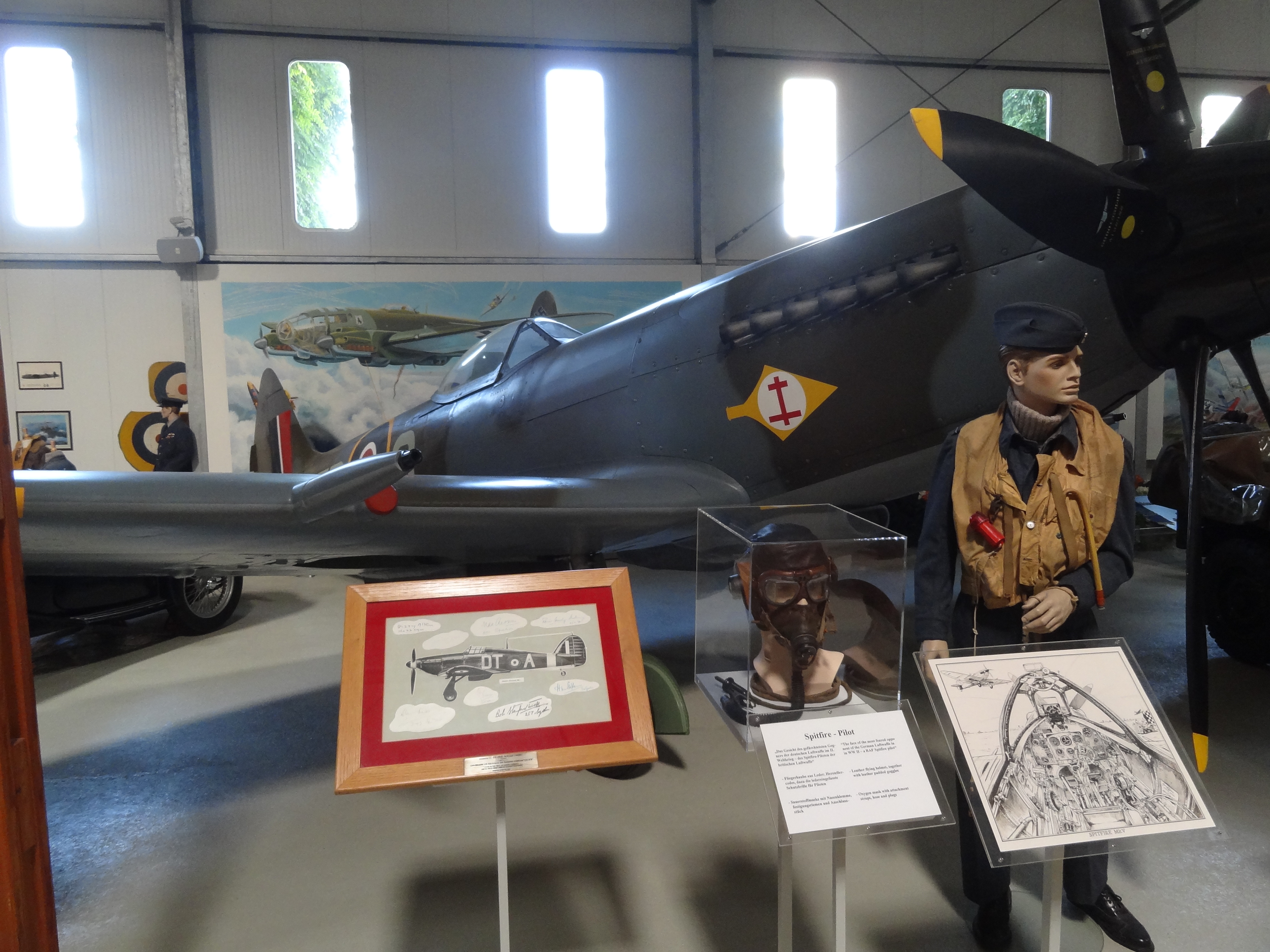
Spitfire Mk XIV

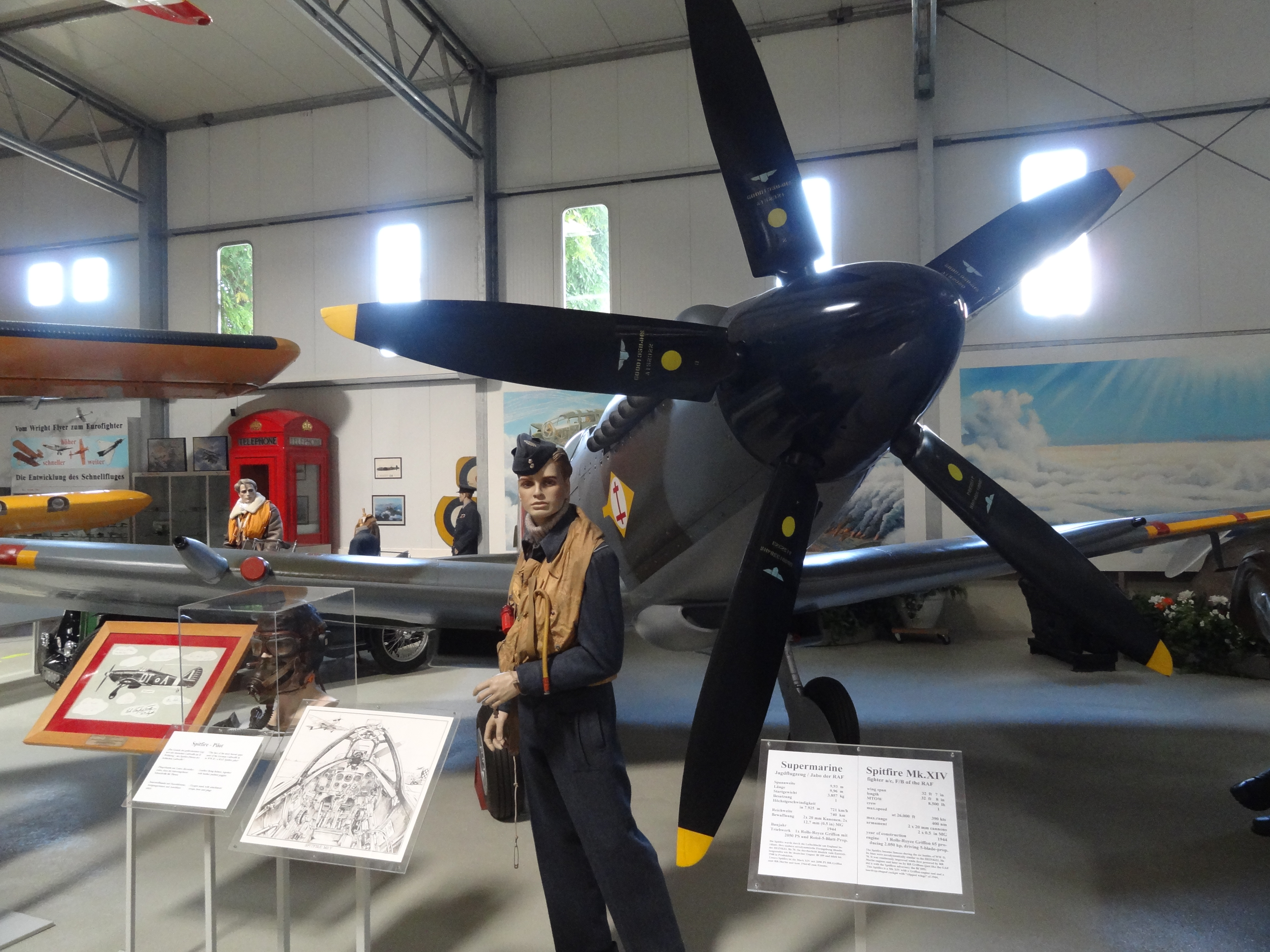
Spitfire Mk XIV

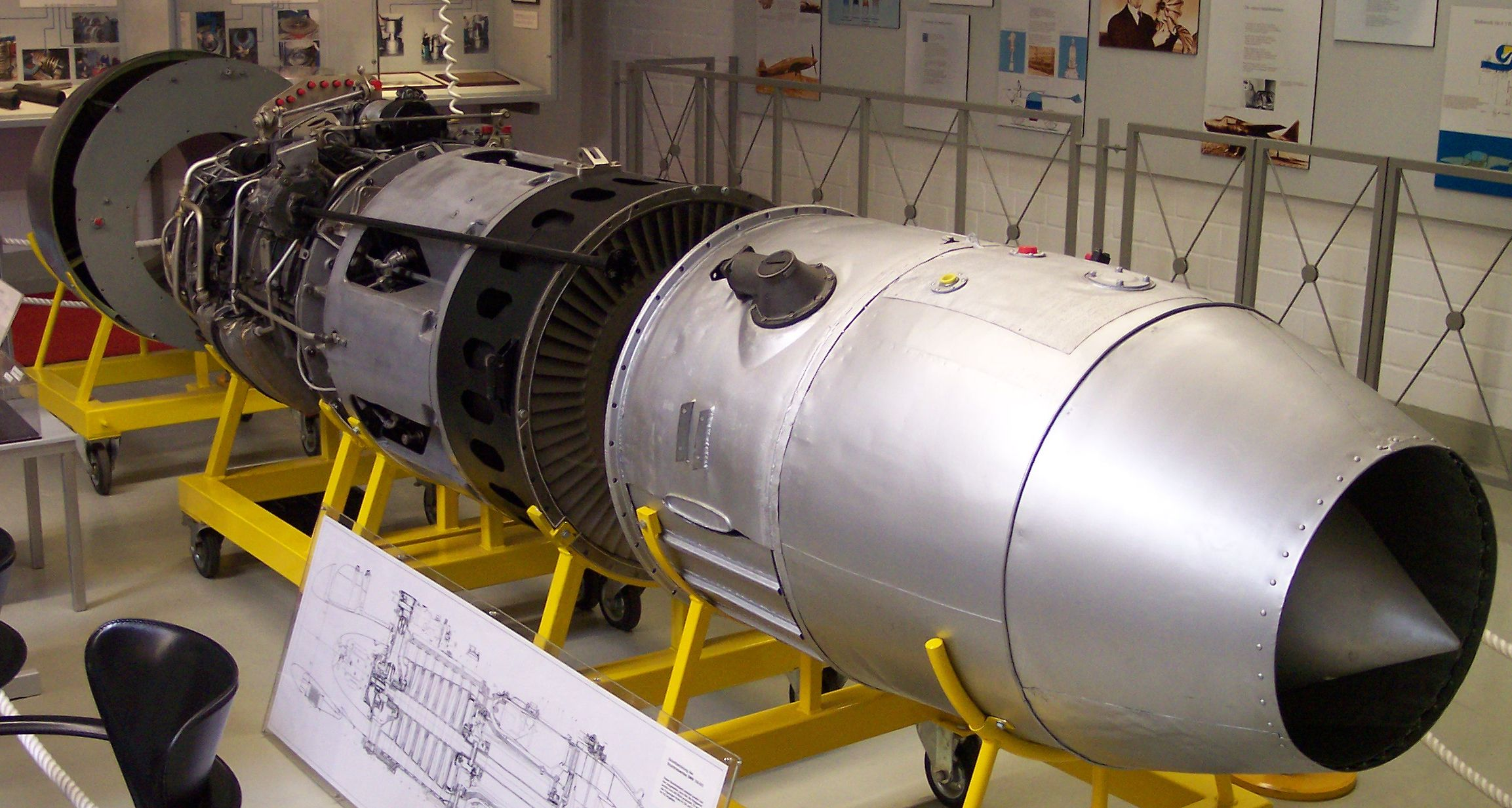
Junkers Jumo 004 jet engine

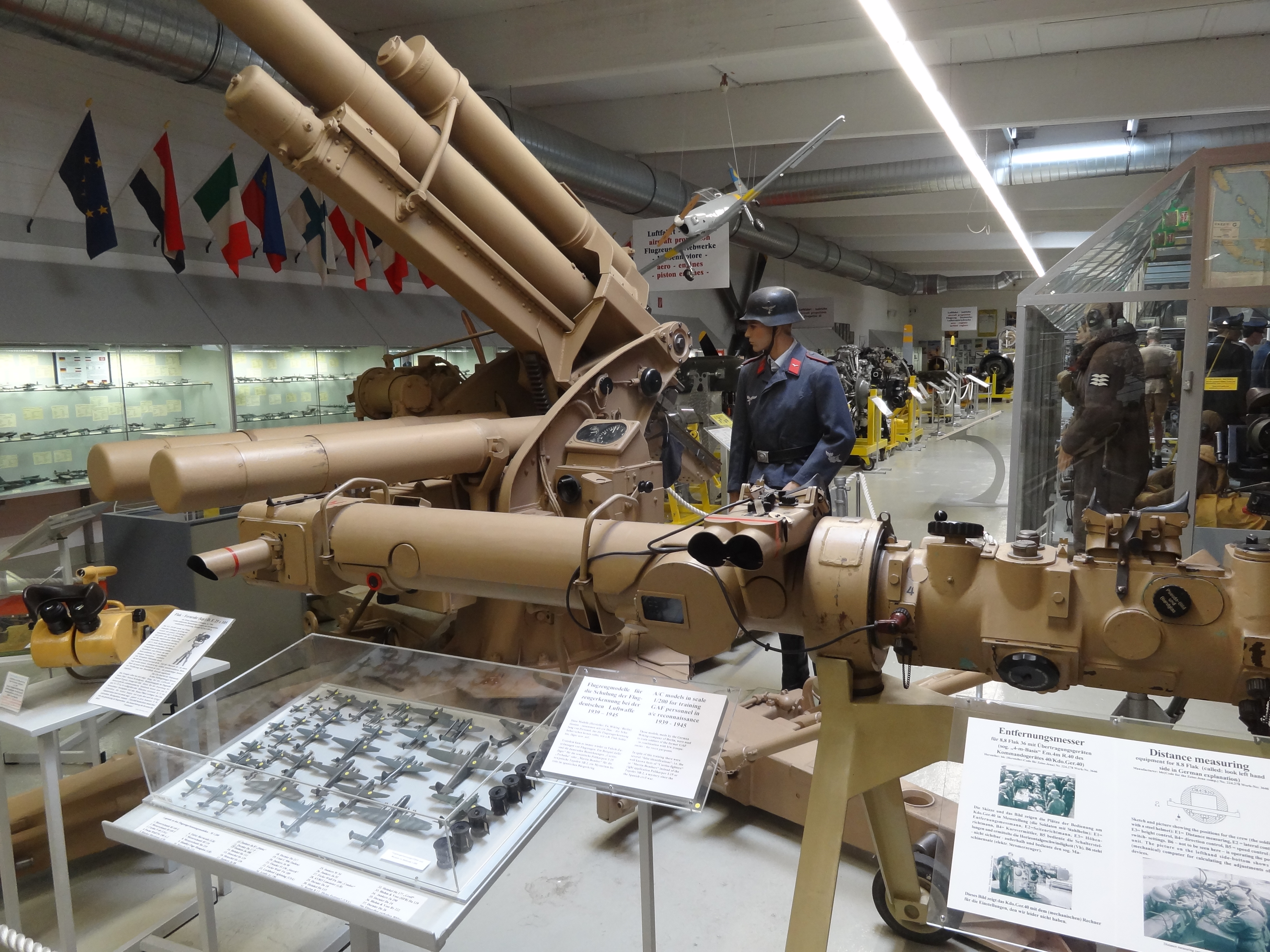
8.8 cm Flak 18/36/37/41

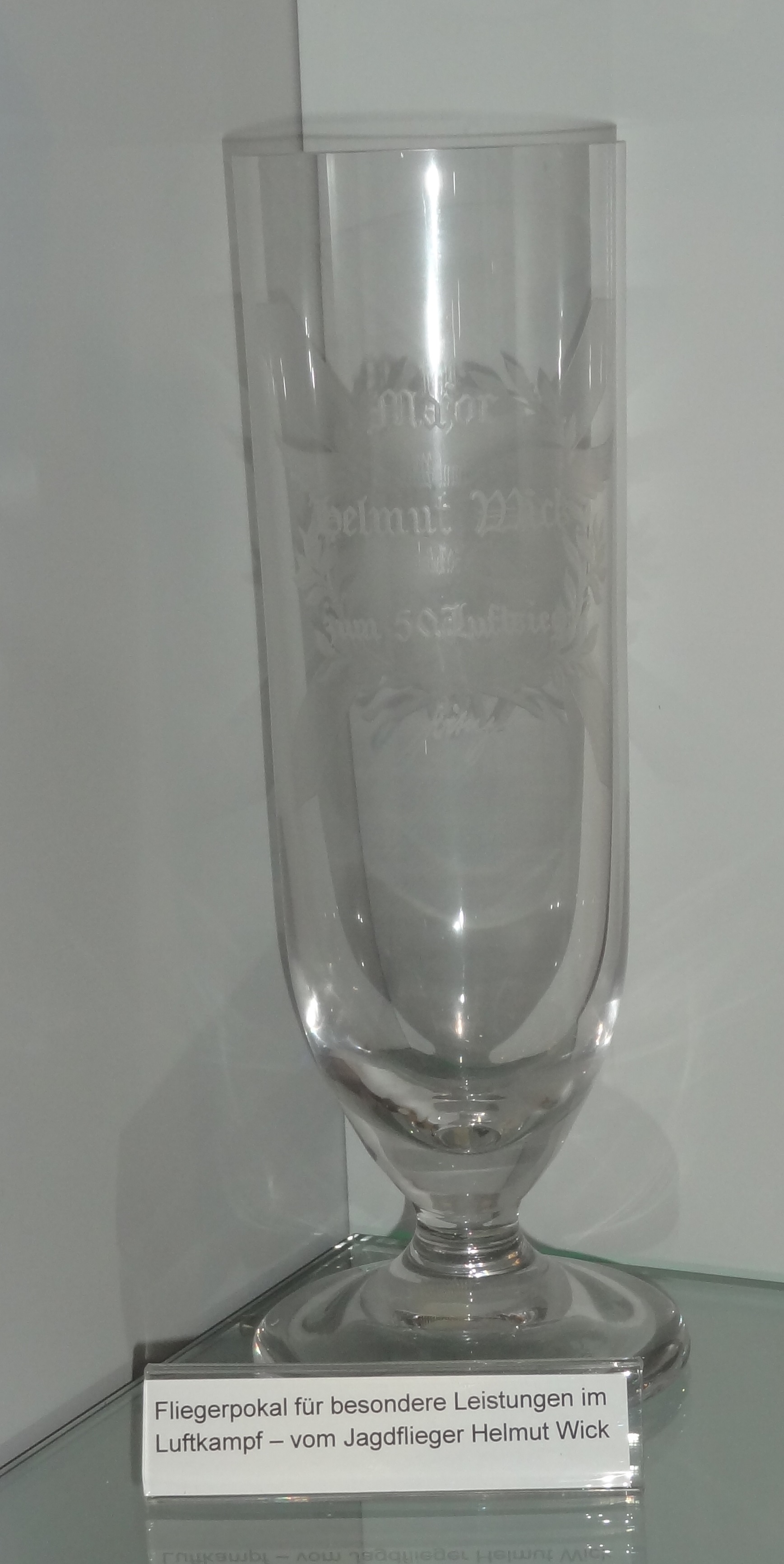
Helmut Wick's Ehrenpokal der Luftwaffe

== See also ==
- List of aerospace museums
