= HESA Bavar 2 =

Iranian ground effect vehicle

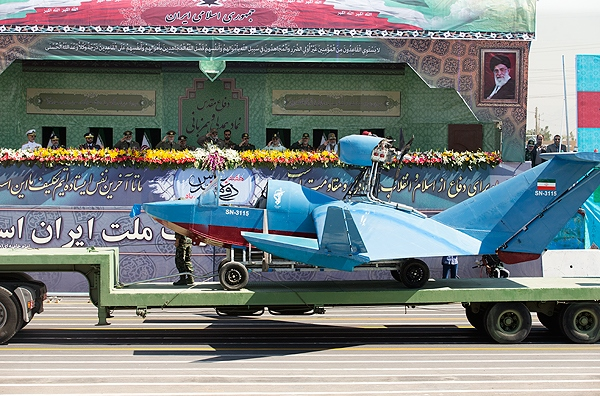
- IRGC-Navy Aviation HESA Bavar 2 ("Belief 2") ground effect vehicle, serial SN-3115, during Iran's Sacred Defense Parade 2015 - Tehran

General information
- Type: Ground effect vehicle
- National origin: Iran
- Manufacturer: Marine Industries Organization of Iran; Malek-Ashtar University of Technology
- Status: Active
- Primary user: IRGC
- Number built: +12

History
- Introduction date: 2010
- First flight: 2009
- Variant: HESA Bavar 4

The HESA Bavar 2 (Persian: باور ٢) is a ground effect vehicle unveiled in September 2010 by the IRGC Navy. It is designed to have a small radar signature, and therefore be difficult to track on radar, to be able to remain undetected while carrying out patrol missions. The vehicle can be equipped with different kinds of weapons including locally produced rockets and missiles. The design is based on the work of Alexander Lippisch and is similar in concept to the 1970s experimental RFB X-113.

== Analysis ==
Because they ride on a cushion of air generated between their wings and the water's surface and don't actually fly, as such, surface-effect vehicles (SEVs) are able to sustain payloads approximately three times the weight of those carried by equivalent-sized airplanes. This fact - taken together with their small size, quick acceleration, high speed, close proximity to the water and ability to blend-in with small, stationary boats on radar while loitering - makes small SEVs like the Bavar ideal platforms for carrying-out asymmetric approaches to conventional naval surface forces, especially at night and within the confines of an area as restricted (and often congested) as the Persian Gulf. The Bavar II exhibits a small radar signature and is therefore difficult to pick-up and track, especially while lying passive/motionless, when set against a cluttered backdrop, while merely trolling (see photo) and/or at longer ranges. Its reduced cross-section is intended to allow the Bavar to remain undetected while carrying out reconnaissance/patrol/attack missions, but its tellingly quick approach is often given-away through its employment of a (radar-reflecting) high propeller and a (heat-emitting) high, exposed engine. For these reasons, future versions are expected to incorporate a smaller and lower, enclosed turbofan, as well as emphasize the more extensive use of carbon-fibre, facetted surfaces and radar-absorbing paint to further minimize their profiles.

== Operators ==
Iran
IRGC-N

== See also ==
- Islamic Republic of Iran Navy
- List of military equipment manufactured in Iran
