= Hoverwing =

Hoverwing can refer to several innovative flying machines / concepts:

- The Hoverwing (rc), a small radio-controlled aircraft under development in Britain
- The Fischer Flugmechanik Hoverwing (FF), an experimental German Ground effect vehicle
- The Universal Hovercraft Hoverwing (UH) ground effect light hovercraft
