= RFB X-114 =

German experimental ground effect vehicle

X-114
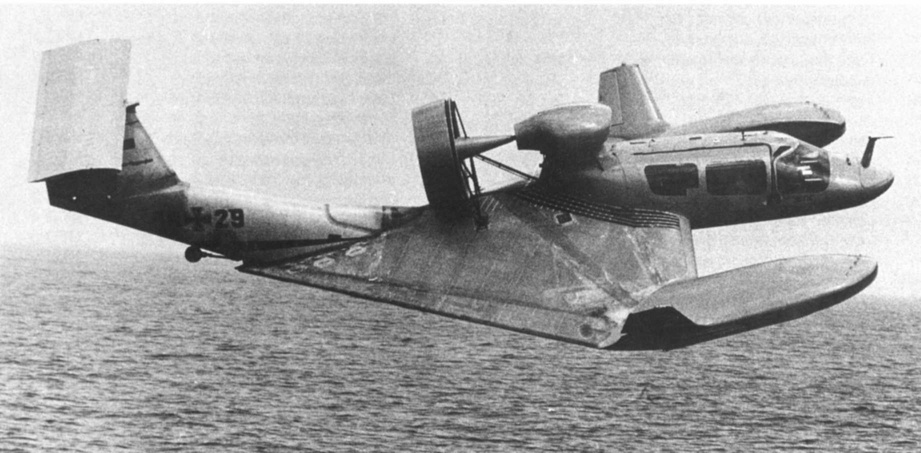
- The X-114 in flight

General information
- Type: Ground-effect vehicle
- National origin: Germany
- Manufacturer: Rhein-Flugzeugbau
- Designer: Alexander Lippisch
- Number built: 1

History
- First flight: April 1977

The RFB X-114 was a ground-effect craft, designed chiefly to operate over water but capable of flight at higher altitudes where required, carrying five or six passengers or freight along coasts and capable of surveillance duties. One was evaluated by the German military in the late 1970s, but no orders followed.

== Design and development ==
The RFB X-114 Aerofoil Craft was an experimental ground-effect vehicle intended to work over water, with the ability to fly out of ground effect when required. It was the last of three such aircraft designed by Alexander Lippisch in the 1960s and early 1970s. The low powered, two-seat proof of concept Collins X-112 was followed by the RFB X-113, structurally and aerodynamically refined, but still low- powered. The much larger X-114 seated six or seven and had a 149 kW (200 hp) engine.

All three were inverse delta aircraft, that is, they had a wing that was triangular in plan, but with a straight, unswept leading edge. Combined with strong anhedral, this layout produces stable flight in ground effect. Specifically, it is claimed that it is stable in pitch and also that it can fly in ground effect at altitudes up to about 50% of its span, allowing it to operate over rough water. This contrasts with the lower aspect ratio square wing of the Ekranoplans, which leaves ground effect at only 10% of span, limiting them to the calmer waters of lakes and rivers.

The weight of the X-114 was more than twice that of the X-112, the next heaviest of the series, but all three shared the same control systems. At each wing tip there was a long, flat bottomed float reaching forward about 2.5 m (8 ft 2 in) beyond the wing's leading edge, with short, outward leaning winglets in line with that edge and fitted with ailerons. At the rear the fuselage swept upwards to a conventional fin and T-tail, the latter carrying elevators. On the water's surface, the floats stabilised the X-114 and, in combination with the strong anhedral, held the fuselage well clear of the water. The X-114 had a pod type fuselage, projecting forward as far as the floats. Seating, in rows of two, accommodated six or seven under multi-section glazing. The pod extended rearwards to about one quarter root chord, its rearmost part unglazed and forming a streamlined pylon for the separately podded, 149 kW (200 hp) Lycoming O-360 flat-four engine. A drive shaft ran rearwards from the engine within a conical fairing to a shrouded, five bladed pusher configuration propeller mounted near mid-chord.

Though primarily intended for over-water flight in ground effect, the X-114 could also be flown out of ground effect over obstructions like trees, peninsulas, or waterfalls. It was also equipped with conventional landing gear, with small wheels retracting into the floats and a tailwheel on the fuselage at the wing's trailing edge, which could be lifted up to lie along the fuselage bottom where it began the upward slope to the tail. It is not clear if this lightweight gear allowed land based take-offs and landings, or if it simply acted as beaching gear, allowing the X-114 easy access from water to land-based facilities.

The X-114 began its trials with the German Ministry of Defence in April 1977. At some stage it was fitted with downward angled hydrofoils mounted to its floats with the aim of decreasing take-off speed, but they proved to have the opposite effect by decreasing the ram air pressure. They also called for care on landing, pulling the craft rapidly into the water if their angle of attack was negative. Despite completing its test programme satisfactorily, no production order was received and the sole prototype was the only X-114 built. It was finally lost in an accident. Though Lippisch died just before the X-114 test programme began, his concept was further developed in the Airfish series of ground effect vehicles, which continued in operation until at least 2012.

== Specifications ==
Data from Jane's All the World's Aircraft 1978-79.

General characteristics

- Crew: One
- Capacity: Five or six passengers
- Length: 12.80 m (42 ft 0 in)
- Wingspan: 7.00 m (23 ft 0 in)
- Height: 2.90 m (9 ft 6 in)
- Empty weight: 1,000 kg (2,205 lb)
- Max takeoff weight: 1,500 kg (3,307 lb)
- Powerplant: 1 × Lycoming IO-360 flat four, 150 kW (200 hp)
- Propellers: 5-bladed ducted pusher configuration

Performance

- Cruise speed: 150 km/h (93 mph, 81 kn) in ground effect. Out of ground effect, estimated: 200 km/h (124 mph; 108 kn)
- Range: 2,000 km (1,200 mi, 1,100 nmi) approximately, in ground effect
- Endurance: 20 hr, in ground effect
