= RFB/Grumman American Fanliner =

Experimental German light aircraft

Fanliner
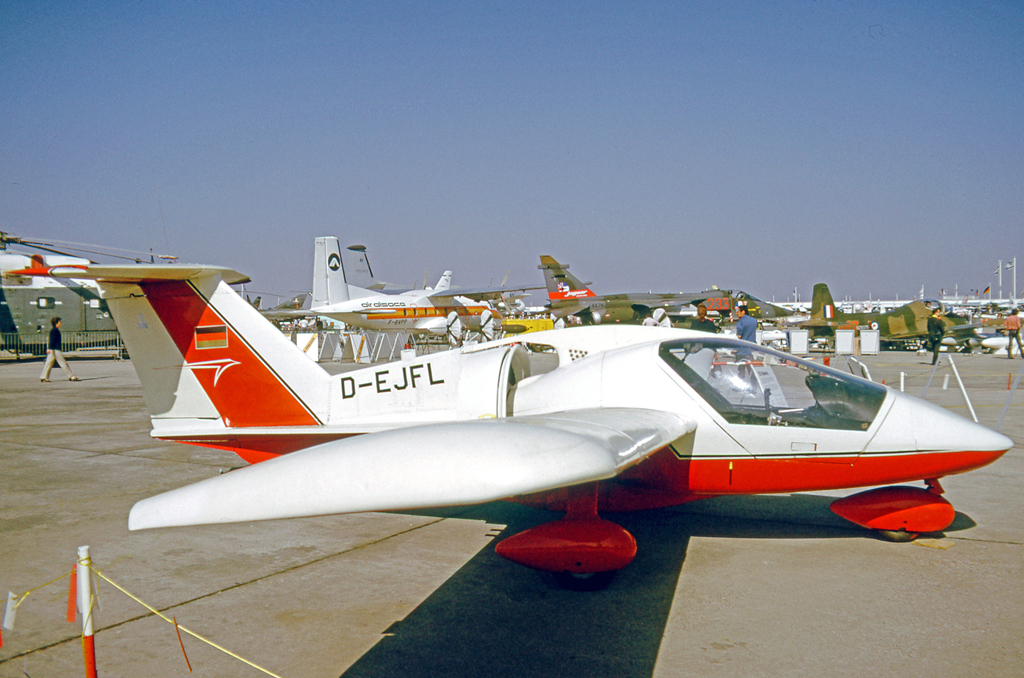

General information
- Type: Experimental light aircraft
- National origin: Germany
- Manufacturer: Rhein-Flugzeugbau
- Number built: 2

History
- First flight: 8 October 1973

The RFB/Grumman American Fanliner was an experimental German light aircraft of the 1970s, propelled by a Wankel engine driving a ducted fan. A joint venture between the German company Rhein-Flugzeugbau (RFB) and the American general aviation manufacturer Grumman American, two examples were built, but no production followed.

== Design and development ==
In the 1960s, Hanno Fischer, Technical Director of Rhein-Flugzeugbau (RFB), developed an interest in aircraft powered by ducted fans integrated into the aircraft structure, flying two modified gliders as testbeds, a VFW-Fokker FK-3 fitted with an eight-bladed ducted fan in the rear fuselage, which flew as the Sirius I in 1969, and a Caproni Vizzola Calif A-21, which flew as the Sirius II on 16 December 1971. Based on the successful results of testing of these aircraft, RFB decided to start work on a two-seat ducted-fan military trainer, intended to offer jet-like handling at low cost, which became the RFB Fantrainer, while in 1972, RFB began studies on a two-seat light touring aircraft with side-by-side seating.

While early interest in the Fantrainer was limited, RFB concentrated on the light tourer, which was named the Fanliner, with the intention that it would be able to act as a testbed for ducted fan installations for the Fantrainer as well as a prospective production aircraft in its own right. RFB entered into a joint venture with Grumman American to develop the Fanliner, allowing the use of components from existing Grumman American light planes.

The first prototype Fanliner made its maiden flight on 8 October 1973. It was a mid-winged monoplane of all-metal construction with a fixed nosewheel undercarriage. The crew of two sat side by side in an enclosed cockpit which hinged on the centreline in a gull-wing door arrangement to give access. Dual controls were fitted. The engine, an 85 kW (114 hp) water-cooled Audi NSU wankel engine was positioned behind the cockpit, and drove the ducted fan situated behind the engine. The radiator for the engine was fitted in the aircraft's nose. The rear fuselage, which carried a T-tail, consisted of a narrow boom extended behind the fan duct, supported by triangular-section beams in a cruciform arrangement. The aircraft's wings and horizontal tail surfaces were taken from a Grumman American AA-1, while the vertical tail surfaces were new. At first the fan was ungeared, which resulted in high noise levels. The engine was replaced by a 110 kW (150 hp) engine in 1974, and considerable testing was carried out with various designs of fans and reduction gearing in order to reduce the noise to acceptable levels. The use of a three-bladed fiberglass fan, with swept blades driven via a gearbox allowed noise levels to be reduced to well below the German statutory limits for light aircraft. The first prototype Fanliner, D-EJFL with makers number 001, was exhibited at the June 1975 Paris Air Show.

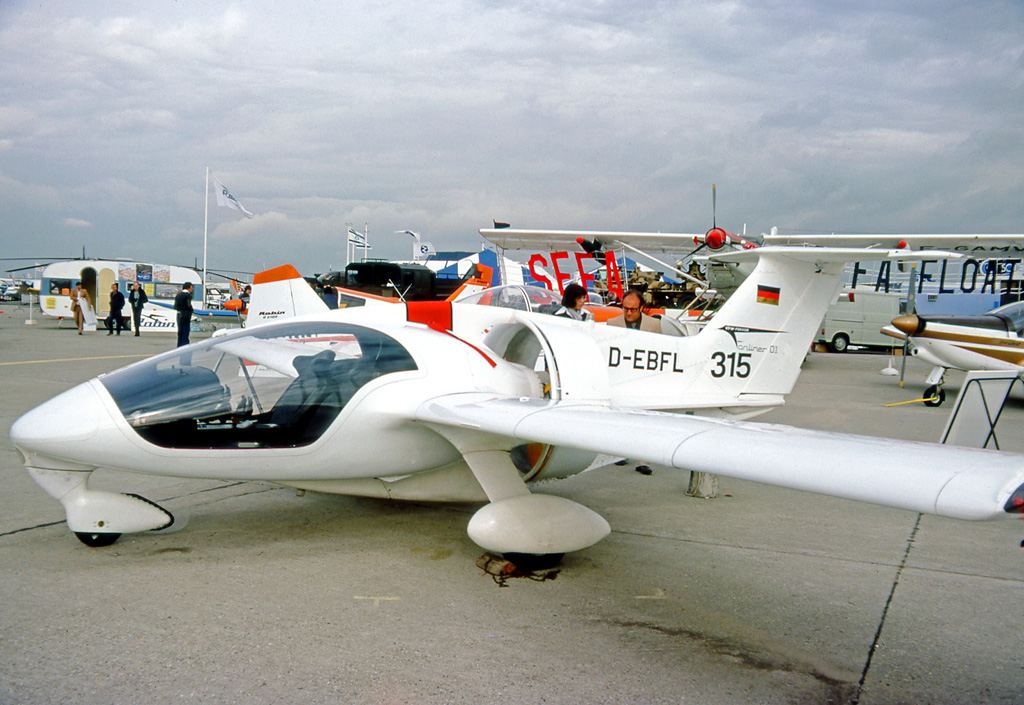
The second Fanliner with revised cockpit glazing and other changes exhibited at the 1977 Paris Air Show

A second, pre-production, aircraft registered D-EBFL, flew on 4 September 1976. It was exhibited at the June 1977 Paris Air Show. This used the wings and horizontal tail from a Grumman American AA-5 had a redesigned, more streamlined fuselage (industrial designer Luigi Colani was involved in redesigning the fuselage) and was fitted with a 110 kW (150 hp) engine with radiators moved to behind the cabin. Wingspan of the second prototype was 9.60 m (31 ft 6 in), while it demonstrated a speed of 251 km/h (156 mph) and a climb rate of 5.5 m/s (1,080 ft/min). No production followed, as RFB decided to concentrate on the military Fantrainer, which had gained priority following the receipt of a contract for two prototypes from the German Federal Ministry of Defence, although the Fanliners did provide useful development data for the Fantrainer's ducted fan.

== Specifications (First prototype) ==
Data from Jane's All The World's Aircraft 1976–77

General characteristics

- Crew: Two
- Length: 6.10 m (20 ft 0 in)
- Wingspan: 7.45 m (24 ft 5 in)
- Height: 2.03 m (6 ft 8 in)
- Wing area: 9.30 m^{2} (100.1 sq ft)
- Aspect ratio: 6.0:1
- Empty weight: 520 kg (1,146 lb)
- Max takeoff weight: 750 kg (1,653 lb)
- Powerplant: 1 × Audi NSU Ro 135 Wankel engine, 85 kW (114 hp)

Performance

- Maximum speed: 220 km/h (140 mph, 120 kn) at sea level
- Cruise speed: 180 km/h (110 mph, 97 kn)
- Range: 660 km (410 mi, 360 nmi)
- Rate of climb: 3.3 m/s (650 ft/min)
