= Ground-effect vehicle =

Special vehicle to fly in air just above sea or ground

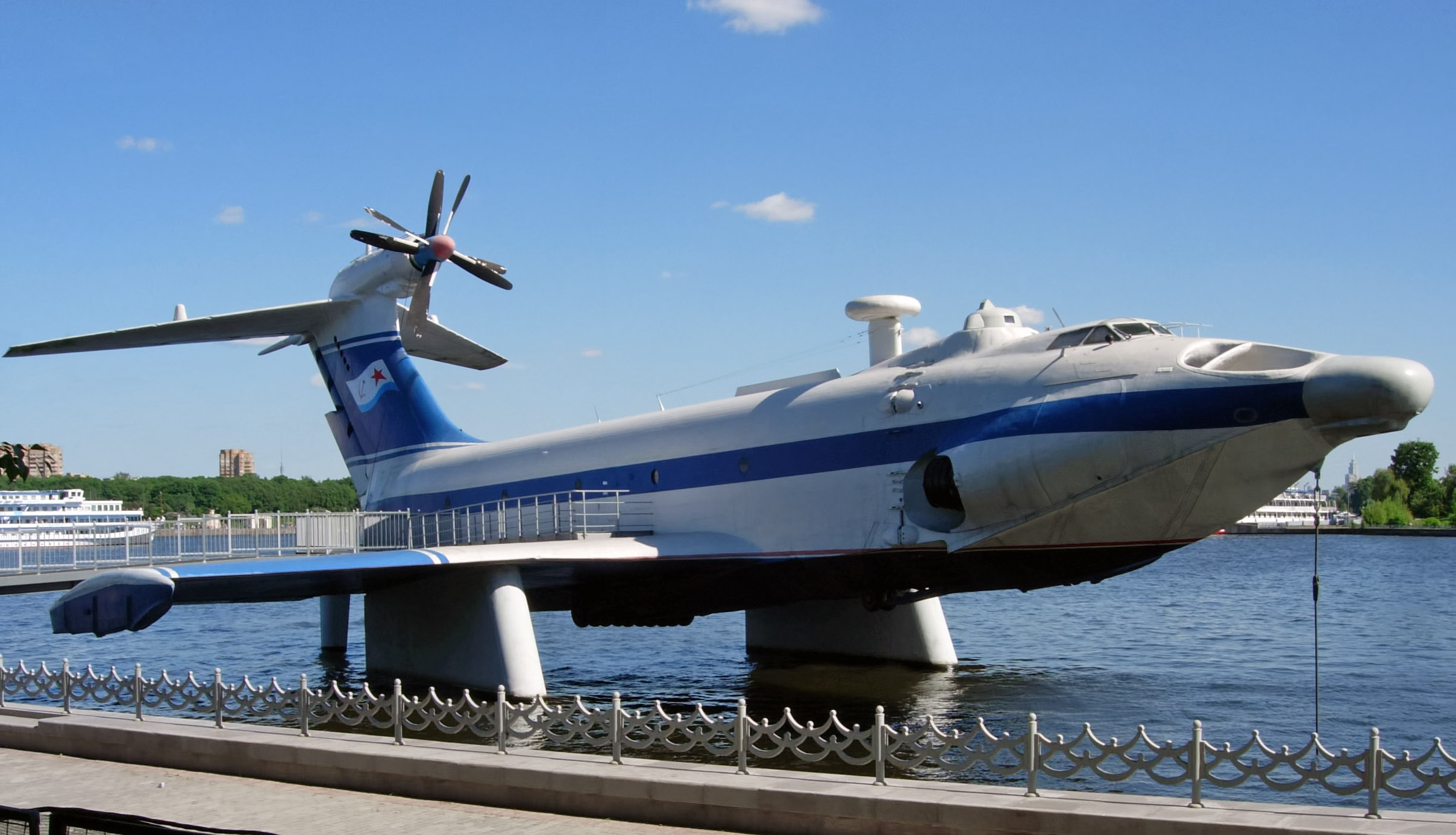
Ekranoplan A-90 Orlyonok

A ground-effect vehicle (GEV), ekranoplan (from Russian: экранопла́н "screenglider"), wing-in-ground-effect (WIGE or WIG), ground-effect craft/machine (GEM), wingship, flarecraft, or surface effect vehicle, is a hybrid surface vehicle/aircraft that makes use of wings to generate minimal lift and ground effect, to reduce aerodynamic drag. Ground effect is the interaction between a moving wing and a stationary surface below it.

Typically, a GEV will glide just above a relatively level surface. Some vehicles can operate over any flat area such as a lake or flat plains.

Technically, GEVs do not include racecars that utilize ground-effect, for increasing downforce, as such vehicles are intended to remain in direct contact with a racetrack.

== Ground effect ==
In aircraft, the ground effect is the reduced aerodynamic drag that an aircraft's wings generate when they are close to a surface (land or water).

The principal benefit of operating in ground effect is to reduce its lift-induced drag. The closer the wing operates to a surface such as the ground ("in ground effect"), the less drag it experiences. When an aircraft enters ground effect, the surface pushes back against the downwash, which reduces its drag.

During takeoff, ground effect can cause an aircraft to "float" while accelerating towards the climb speed, reducing friction.

== Takeoff ==
Any airfoil passing through air increases air pressure on the underside, while decreasing pressure on the upper side, which generates lift. The high and low pressures are maintained until they flow off the ends of the wings, where they form vortices that are the major source of lift-induced drag—normally a significant portion of the total drag.

In GEV, the angle of attack is the angle between its chordline (a straight line from the leading edge to the trailing edge) and the ground. On takeoff, airplanes pitch their noses up to increase the angle of attack to reach the ideal of 12–20 degrees (depending on wing design and other factors).

== Design ==
Placing the wing near a surface has the same effect as increasing the aspect ratio because the surface prevents wingtip vortices from expanding, but without the complications associated with a long, slender wing. The stubby wings on a GEV can produce as much lift as the much larger wing on a transport aircraft, though only while close to the earth's surface. Once sufficient speed has built up, some GEVs can function as conventional aircraft until approaching a destination. However, they are unable to land or take off without a significant amount of help from the ground effect, and cannot climb until they have reached a much higher speed. The greater the wingspan, the less drag created for each unit of lift and the greater the efficiency of the wing.

GEVs are not statically supported upon a cushion of pressurized air from a downward-directed fan. Some GEV designs, such as the Russian Lun and Dingo, blew air under the wing using auxiliary engines to assist takeoff; however they still require forward motion to generate sufficient lift to fly, unlike hovercraft, also lacking low-speed hover capability. GEVs also have no contact with the surface when in flight.

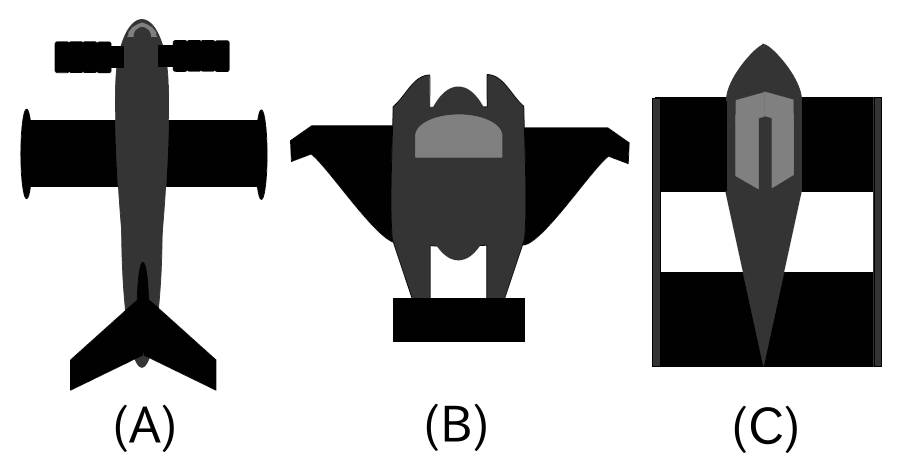
WIG-wings configurations: (A) Straight wing; (B) Reverse-delta wing; (C) Tandem wing.

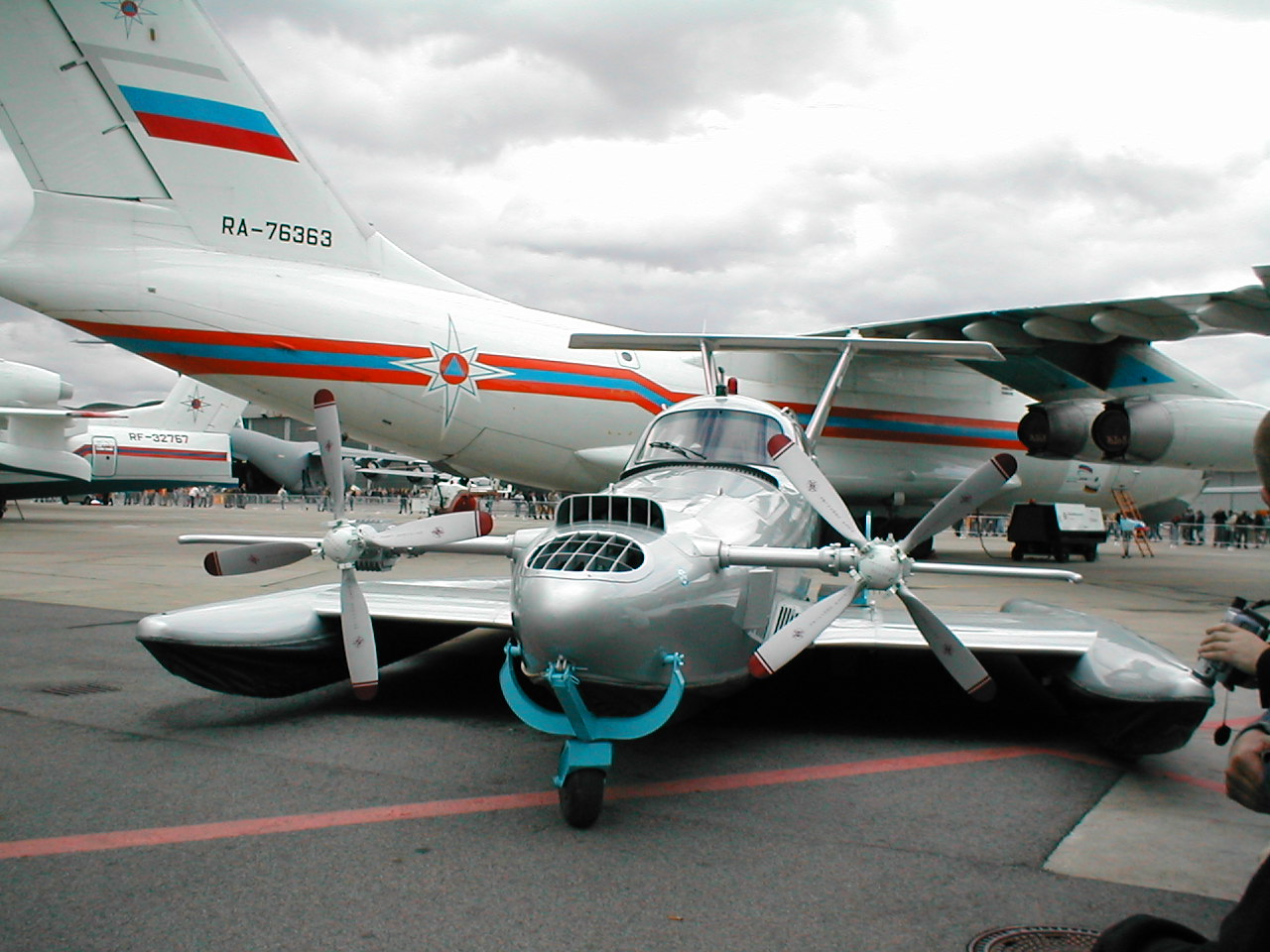
A Russian light ekranoplan Aquaglide-2

=== Straight wing ===
Used by the Russian Rostislav Alexeyev for his ekranoplan. The wings are significantly shorter than those of comparable aircraft, and this configuration requires a high aft-placed horizontal tail to maintain stability. The pitch and altitude stability comes from the lift slope (Note: Cl/da, with Cl = lift coefficient, and a = angle of incidence.) difference between a front low wing in ground-effect (commonly the main wing) and an aft, higher-located second wing nearly out of ground-effect (generally named a stabilizer). A design by REGENT uses a related design in the form of an approximately L-shaped wing attached to the top of the fuselage, with a pontoon at the end for water landings.

=== Reverse-delta wing ===
Developed by Alexander Lippisch, this wing allows stable flight in ground-effect through self-stabilization. This is the main Class B form of GEV. Hanno Fischer later developed WIG craft based on the configuration, which were then transferred to multiple companies in Asia, thus becoming one of the "standards" in GEV design.

=== Tandem wings ===
Tandem wings can have three configurations:

- A biplane-style type-1 utilising a shoulder-mounted main lift wing and belly-mounted sponsons similar to those on combat and transport helicopters.
- A canard-style type-2 with a mid-size horizontal wing (Note: Not a stabilizer because destabilizing.) near the nose of the craft directing airflow under the main lift airfoil. This type-2 tandem design is a major improvement during takeoff, as it creates an air cushion to lift the craft above the water at a lower speed, thereby reducing water drag, which is the biggest obstacle to successful seaplane launches.
- Two stubby wings as in the tandem-airfoil flairboat produced by Günther Jörg in Germany. His particular design is self-stabilizing longitudinally.

== Advantages and disadvantages ==
Given similar hull size and power, and depending on its specific design, the lower lift-induced drag of a GEV, as compared to an aircraft of similar capacity, will improve its fuel efficiency and, up to a point, its speed. GEVs are also much faster than surface vessels of similar power, because they avoid drag from the water.

On the water the aircraft-like construction of GEVs increases the risk of damage in collisions with surface objects. Furthermore, the limited number of egress points make it more difficult to evacuate the vehicle in an emergency. According to WST, the builders of the WIG craft WSH-500, GEVs furthermore have the advantage of avoiding conflict with ocean currents by flying over them.

Since most GEVs are designed to operate from water, accidents and engine failure typically are less hazardous than in a land-based aircraft, but the lack of altitude control leaves the pilot with fewer options for avoiding collision, and to some extent that negates such benefits. Low altitude brings high-speed craft into conflict with ships, buildings and rising land, which may not be sufficiently visible in poor conditions to avoid. GEVs may be unable to climb over or turn sharply enough to avoid collisions, while drastic, low-level maneuvers risk contact with solid or water hazards beneath. Aircraft can climb over most obstacles, but GEVs are more limited.

In high winds, take-off must be into the wind, which takes the craft across successive lines of waves, causing heavy pounding, stressing the craft and creating an uncomfortable ride. In light winds, waves may be in any direction, which can make control difficult as each wave causes the vehicle to both pitch and roll. The lighter construction of GEVs makes their ability to operate in higher sea states less than that of conventional ships, but greater than the ability of hovercraft or hydrofoils, which are closer to the water surface.

Like conventional aircraft, greater power is needed for takeoff, and, like seaplanes, ground-effect vehicles must get on the step before they can accelerate to flight speed. Careful design, usually with multiple redesigns of hullforms, is required to get this right, which increases engineering costs. This obstacle is more difficult for GEVs with short production runs to overcome. For the vehicle to work, its hull needs to be stable enough longitudinally to be controllable yet not so stable that it cannot lift off the water.

The bottom of the vehicle must be formed to avoid excessive pressures on landing and taking off without sacrificing too much lateral stability, and it must not create too much spray, which damages the airframe and the engines. The Russian ekranoplans show evidence of fixes for these problems in the form of multiple chines on the forward part of the hull undersides and in the forward location of the jet engines.

Finally, limited utility has kept production levels low enough that it has been impossible to amortize development costs sufficiently to make GEVs competitive with conventional aircraft.

A 2014 study by students at NASA's Ames Research Center claims that use of GEVs for passenger travel could lead to cheaper flights, increased accessibility and less pollution.

== Classification ==
One obstacle to GEV development is the classification and legislation to be applied. The International Maritime Organization has studied the application of rules based on the International Code of Safety for High-Speed Craft (HSC code) which was developed for fast ships such as hydrofoils, hovercraft, catamarans and the like. The Russian Rules for classification and construction of small type A ekranoplans is a document upon which most GEV design is based. However, in 2005, the IMO classified the WISE or GEV under the category of ships.

The International Maritime Organization recognizes three types of GEVs:

1. A craft which is certified for operation only in ground effect;
2. A craft which is certified to temporarily increase its altitude to a limited height outside the influence of ground effect but not exceeding 150 m (490 ft) above the surface; and
3. A craft which is certified for operation outside ground effect and exceeding 150 m (490 ft) above the surface.

At the time of writing, those classes only applied to craft carrying 12 passengers or more, and (as of 2019) there was disagreement between national regulatory agencies about whether these vehicles should be classified, and regulated, as aircraft or as boats.

== History ==
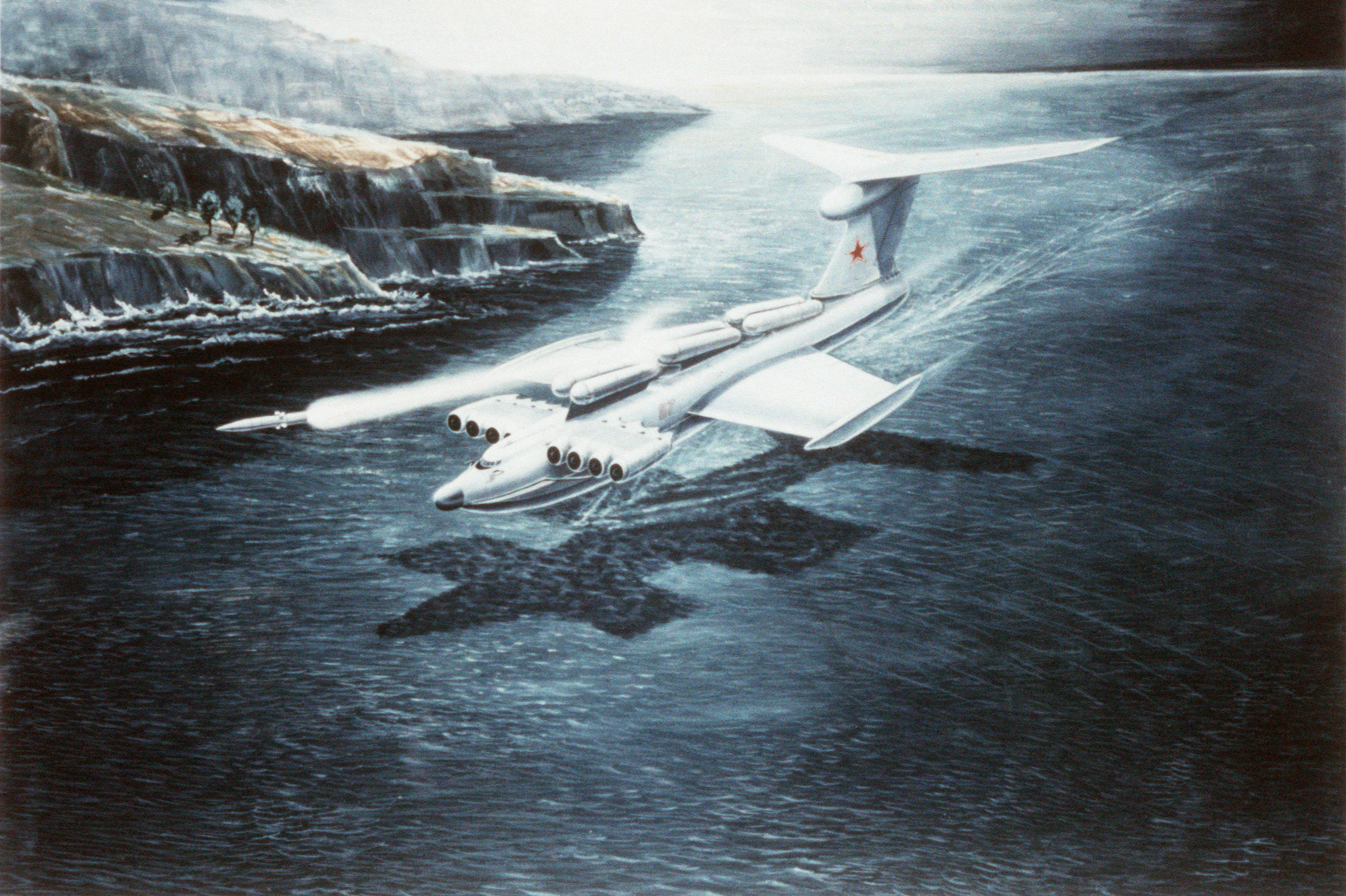
Artist's concept of a Lun-class ekranoplan in flight

The term Ground-Effect Vehicle originally referred to any craft utilizing ground effect, including what later became known as hovercraft, in patent descriptions during the 1950s. However, this term came to exclude air-cushion vehicles or hovercraft.

By the 1920s, the ground effect phenomenon was well-known, as pilots found that their airplanes appeared to become more efficient as they neared the runway surface during landing. In 1934 the US National Advisory Committee for Aeronautics issued Technical Memorandum 771, Ground Effect on the Takeoff and Landing of Airplanes, which was a translation into English of a summary of French research on the subject. The French author Maurice Le Sueur had added a suggestion based on this phenomenon: "Here the imagination of inventors is offered a vast field. The ground interference reduces the power required for level flight in large proportions, so here is a means of rapid and at the same time economic locomotion: Design an airplane which is always within the ground-interference zone. At first glance this apparatus is dangerous because the ground is uneven and the altitude called skimming permits no freedom of maneuver. But on large-sized aircraft, over water, the question may be attempted ..."

By the 1960s, the technology started maturing, in large part due to the independent contributions of Rostislav Alexeyev in the Soviet Union and German Alexander Lippisch, working in the United States. Alexeyev worked from his background as a ship designer whereas Lippisch worked as an aeronautical engineer. The influence of Alexeyev and Lippisch remains noticeable in most GEVs seen today.

=== Initial efforts ===
==== Canada ====
It is said that the research hydrofoil HD-4 by Alexander Graham Bell had part of its dynamic lift contributed by its pair of wings operating in ground effect. However it is dubious whether the designer was aware of its existence due to the relative infancy of aerodynamics.

Avro Canada investigated into aircraft with a Coanda-effect propulsion system. Such jets were supposed to create an air cushion below the airframe that will allow them to hover on the ground. In fact, of the only test aircraft built, this was the only mode they could possibly operate from due to stability issues when taking off. The designs were later further developed by the United States, while Convair could have possibly been inspired by them to create a preliminary design of a large ocean-going ground-effect ship called Hydroskimmer.

==== Soviet Union ====
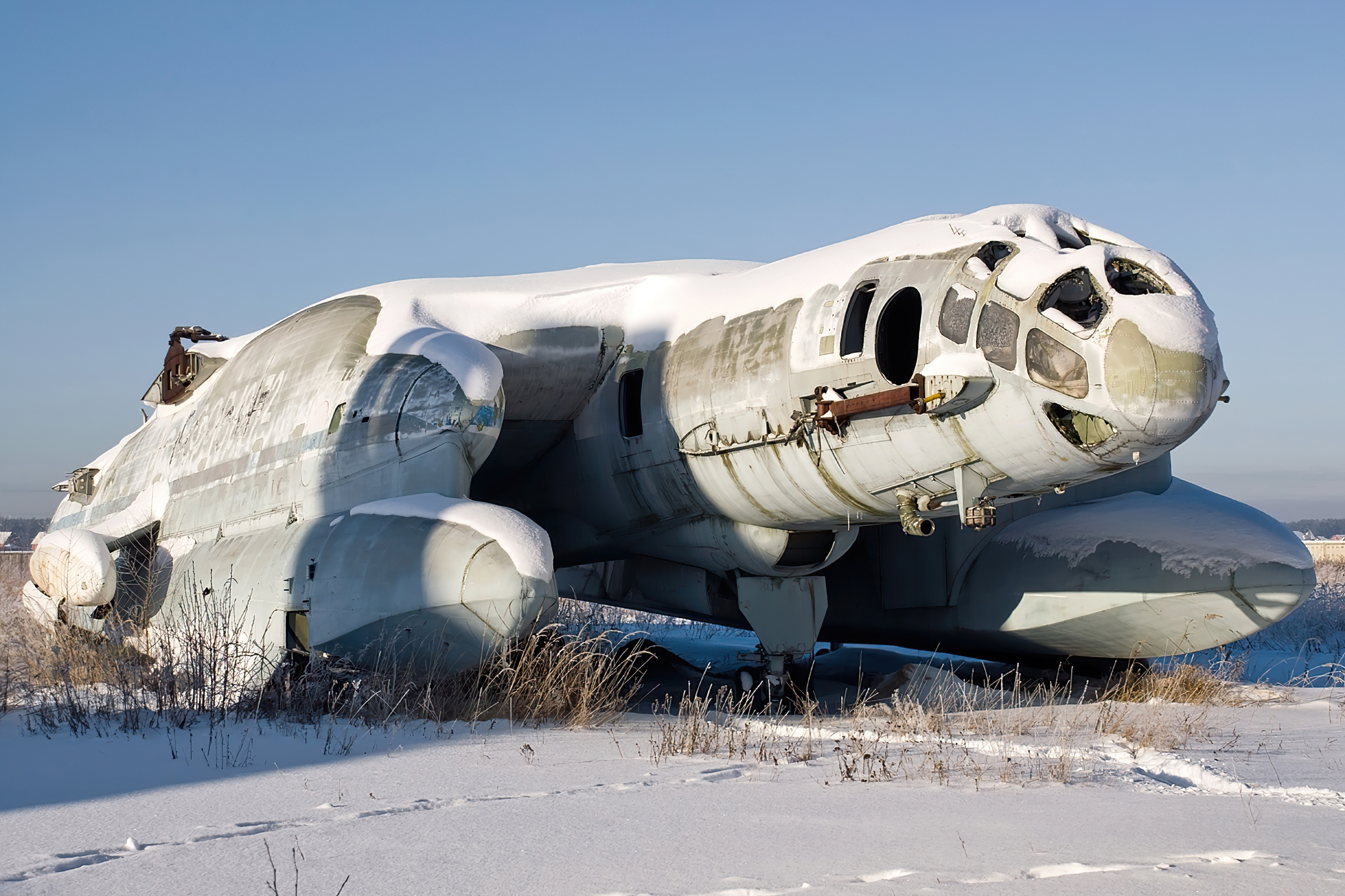
The Bartini Beriev VVA-14, developed during the 1970s

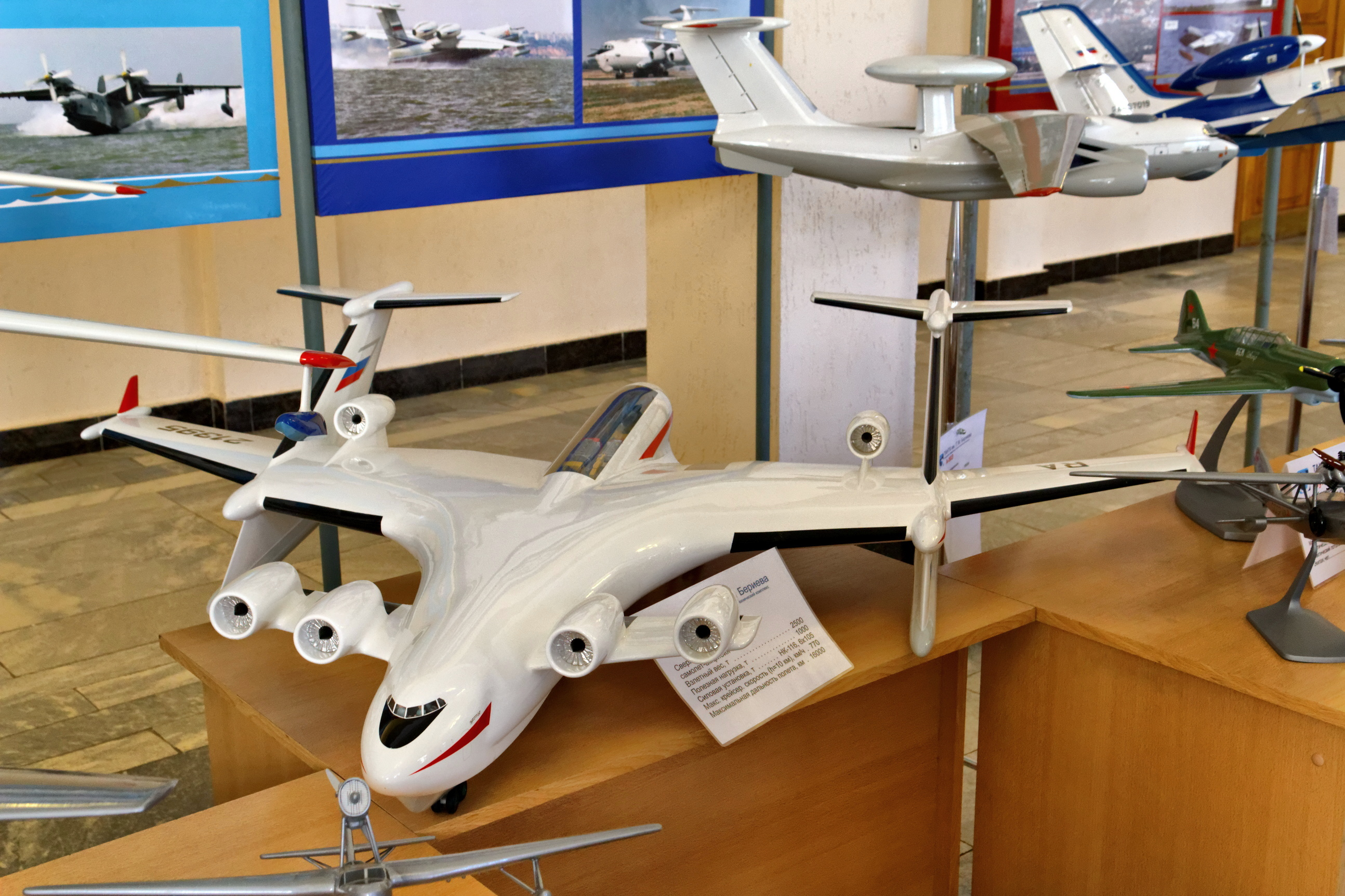
Model of the Beriev Be-2500 concept aircraft

Led by Alexeyev, the Soviet Central Hydrofoil Design Bureau (Russian: ЦКБ СПК) was the center of ground-effect craft development in the USSR. The vehicle came to be known as an ekranoplan (Russian: экранопла́н, экран screen + план plane, from Russian: эффект экрана, literally screen effect, or ground effect in English). The military potential for such a craft was soon recognized, and Alexeyev received support and financial resources from Soviet leader Nikita Khrushchev.

Some manned and unmanned prototypes were built, ranging up to eight tonnes in displacement. This led to the development of a 550-tonne military ekranoplan of 92 m (302 ft) length. The craft was dubbed the Caspian Sea Monster by U.S. intelligence experts, after a huge, unknown craft was spotted on satellite reconnaissance photos of the Caspian Sea area in the 1960s. With its short wings, it looked airplane-like in planform, but would probably be incapable of flight. Although it was designed to travel a maximum of 3 m (10 ft) above the sea, it was found to be most efficient at 20 m (66 ft), reaching a top speed of 300–400 knots (560–740 km/h) in research flights.

The Soviet ekranoplan program continued with the support of Minister of Defence Dmitriy Ustinov. It produced the most successful ekranoplan so far, the 125-tonne A-90 Orlyonok. These craft were originally developed as high-speed military transports and were usually based on the shores of the Caspian Sea and Black Sea. The Soviet Navy ordered 120 Orlyonok-class ekranoplans, but this figure was later reduced to fewer than 30 vessels, with planned deployment mainly in the Black Sea and Baltic Sea fleets.

A few Orlyonoks served with the Soviet Navy from 1979 to 1992. In 1987, the 400-tonne Lun-class ekranoplan was built as an anti-ship missile launch platform. A second Lun, renamed Spasatel, was laid down as a rescue vessel, but was never finished. The two major problems that the Soviet ekranoplans faced were poor longitudinal stability and a need for reliable navigation.

Minister Ustinov died in 1984, and the new Minister of Defence, Marshal Sokolov, cancelled funding for the program. Only three operational Orlyonok-class ekranoplans (with revised hull design) and one Lun-class ekranoplan remained at a naval base near Kaspiysk.

Since the dissolution of the Soviet Union, ekranoplans have been produced by the Volga Shipyard in Nizhniy Novgorod. Smaller ekranoplans for non-military use have been under development. The CHDB had already developed the eight-seat Volga-2 in 1985, and Technologies and Transport is developing a smaller version called the Amphistar. Beriev proposed a large craft of the type, the Be-2500, as a "flying ship" cargo carrier, but nothing came of the project.

==== United States ====
During the 1950s, the US Navy investigated into anti-submarine vessels operating on the ram effect, a product of ground effect. The vessels were to use this to create an air cushion below the hulls, allowing hovering. If necessary, additional engines were to be used to blow air underneath the craft. The project was designated RAM-2.

Several other projects were proposed throughout the early Cold War, some using a similar mix of wings and lift engines while others were more akin to Russian types.

More than a decade later, General Dynamics patented catamaran vessels equipped with ground-effect. The military looked at the Boeing Pelican proposal in the early 2000s, which would have produced a large ground-effect aircraft that would not have taken off or landed from water. A DARPA project from mid-2022 was funding the Liberty Lifter concept, which would involve a similar aircraft that could operate from water. That program was cancelled in 2025.

==== Germany ====
===== Lippisch Type and Hanno Fischer =====
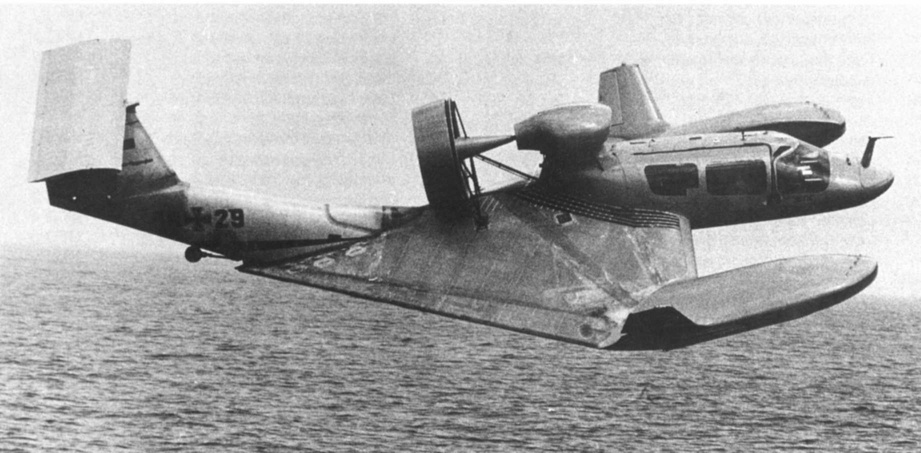
The Rhein-Flugzeugbau X-114 in flight.

In Germany, Lippisch was asked to build a very fast boat for American businessman Arthur A. Collins. In 1963 Lippisch developed the X-112, a revolutionary design with reversed delta wing and T-tail. This design proved to be stable and efficient in ground effect, and even though it was successfully tested, Collins decided to stop the project and sold the patents to the German company Rhein Flugzeugbau (RFB), which further developed the inverse delta concept into the X-113 and the six-seat X-114. These craft could be flown out of ground effect so that, for example, peninsulas could be overflown.

Hanno Fischer took over the works from RFB and created his own company, Fischer Flugmechanik, which eventually completed two models. The Airfisch 3 carried two persons, and the FS-8 carried six persons. The FS-8 Dragon Commuter was to be developed by Fischer Flugmechanik for a Singapore-Australian joint venture called Flightship. Powered by a V8 Chevrolet automobile engine rated at 337 kW, the prototype made its first flight in February 2001 in the Netherlands. The company no longer exists but the prototype craft was bought by Wigetworks, a company based in Singapore and renamed as AirFish 8. In 2010, that vehicle was registered as a ship in the Singapore Registry of Ships.

The University of Duisburg-Essen is supporting an ongoing research project to develop the Hoverwing.

===== Günther Jörg-type tandem-airfoil flairboat =====
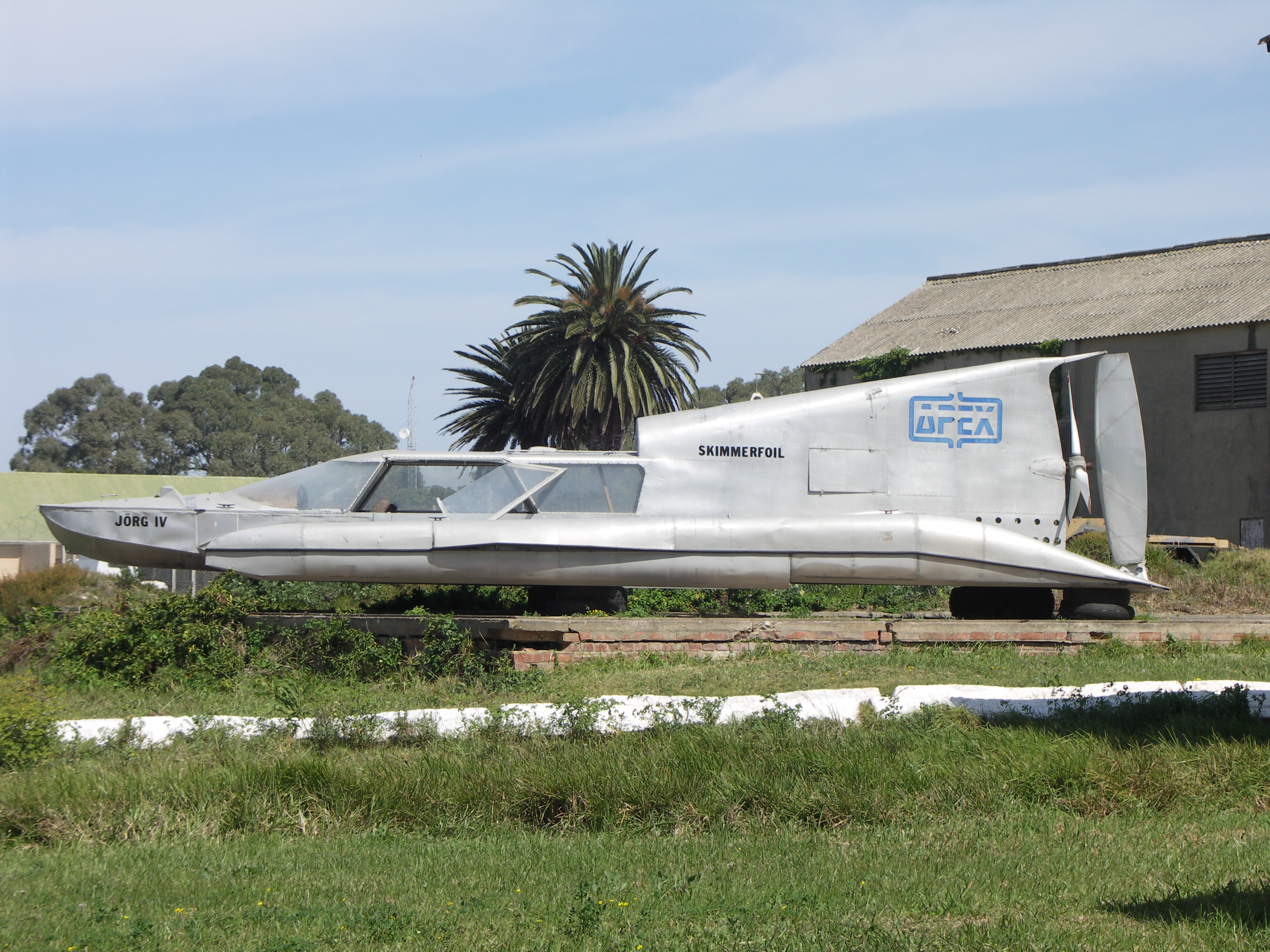
A tandem flarecraft Skimmerfoil Jörg IV located at the SAAF Museum, Port Elizabeth, South Africa. (It has since been removed from the museum)

German engineer Günther Jörg, who had worked on Alexeyev's first designs and was familiar with the challenges of GEV design, developed a GEV with two wings in a tandem arrangement, the Jörg-II. It was the third, manned, tandem-airfoil boat, named "Skimmerfoil", which was developed during his consultancy period in South Africa. It was a simple and low-cost design of a first 4-seater tandem-airfoil flairboat completely constructed of aluminium. The prototype was in the SAAF Port Elizabeth Museum from 4 July 2007 until 2013, and is now in private use. Pictures of the museum show the boat after some years outside the museum and without protection against the sun.

The consultancy of Günther Jörg, a specialist and insider of German airplane industry from 1963 and a colleague of Alexander Lippisch and Hanno Fischer, was founded with a fundamental knowledge of wing in ground effect physics, as well as results of fundamental tests under different conditions and designs having begun in 1960. For over 30 years, Jörg built and tested 15 different tandem-airfoil flairboats in different sizes and made of different materials.

The following tandem-airfoil flairboat (TAF) types had been built after a previous period of nearly 10 years of research and development:

1. TAB VII-3: First manned tandem W.I.G type Jörg, being built at Technical University of Darmstadt, Akaflieg
2. TAF VII-5: Second manned tandem-airfoil Flairboat, 2 seater made of wood
3. TAF VIII-1: 2-seater tandem-airfoil flairboat built of glass-reinforced plastic (GRP) and aluminium. A small serie of 6 Flairboats had been produced by former Botec Company
4. TAF VIII-2: 4-seater tandem-airfoil Flairboat built of full aluminium (2 units) and built of GRP (3 units)
5. TAF VIII-3: 8-seater tandem-airfoil Flairboat built of aluminium combined with GRP parts
6. TAF VIII-4: 12-seater tandem-airfoil Flairboat built of aluminium combined with GRP parts
7. TAF VIII-3B: 6-seater tandem-airfoil flairboat under carbon fibre composite construction

Bigger concepts are: 25-seater, 32-seater, 60-seater, 80-seater and bigger up to the size of a passenger airplane.

=== 1980–1999 ===
Since the 1980s GEVs have been primarily smaller craft designed for the recreational and civilian ferry markets. Germany, Russia and the United States have provided most of the activity with some development in Australia, China, Japan, Korea and Taiwan. In these countries and regions, small craft with up to ten seats have been built. Other larger designs such as ferries and heavy transports have been proposed but have not been carried to completion.

Besides the development of appropriate design and structural configuration, automatic control and navigation systems have been developed. These include altimeters with high accuracy for low altitude flight and lesser dependence on weather conditions. "Phase radio altimeters" have become the choice for such applications beating laser altimeter, isotropic or ultrasonic altimeters.

With Russian consultation, the United States Defense Advanced Research Projects Agency (DARPA) studied the Aerocon Dash 1.6 wingship.

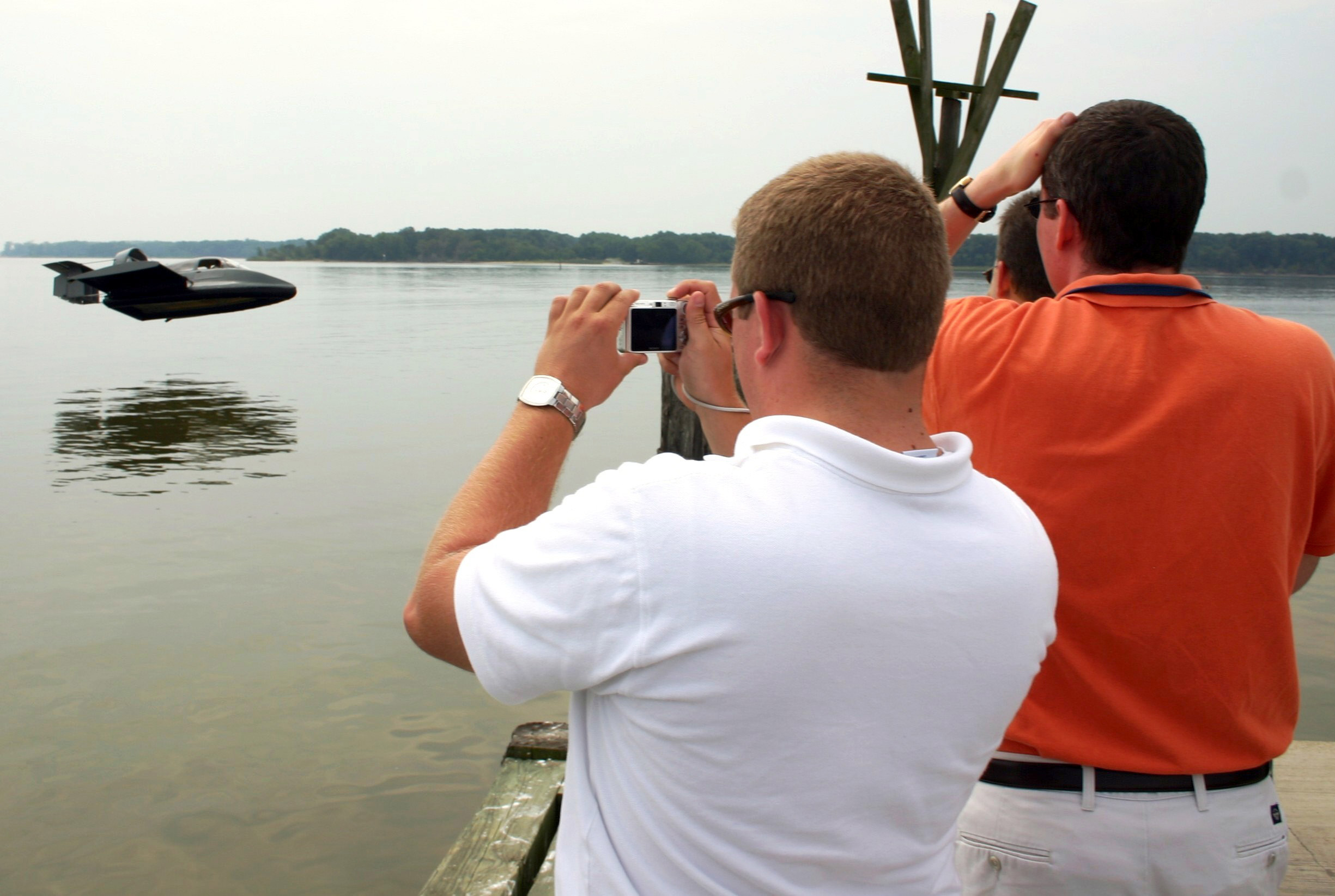
A Hoverwing

Universal Hovercraft developed a flying hovercraft, first flying a prototype in 1996. Since 1999, the company has offered plans, parts, kits and manufactured ground effect hovercraft called the Hoverwing.

=== 2000–2019 ===
Iran deployed three squadrons of Bavar 2 two-seat GEVs in September 2010. This GEV carries one machine gun and surveillance gear, and incorporates features to reduce its radar signature. In October 2014, satellite images showed the GEV in a shipyard in southern Iran. The GEV has two engines and no armament.

In Singapore, Wigetworks obtained certification from Lloyd's Register for entry into class. On 31 March 2011, AirFish 8-001 became one of the first GEVs to be flagged with the Singapore Registry of Ships, one of the largest ship registries. Wigetworks partnered with National University of Singapore's Engineering Department to develop higher capacity GEVs.

Burt Rutan in 2011 and Korolev in 2015 showed GEV projects.

In Korea, Wing Ship Technology Corporation developed and tested a 50-seat passenger GEV named the WSH-500. in 2013

Estonian transport company Sea Wolf Express planned to launch passenger service in 2019 between Helsinki and Tallinn, a distance of 87 km taking only half an hour, using a Russian-built ekranoplan. The company ordered 15 ekranoplans with maximum speed of 185 km/h and capacity of 12 passengers, built by Russian RDC Aqualines.

=== 2020–present ===
Around mid-2022, the US Defense Advanced Research Projects Agency (DARPA) launched its Liberty Lifter project, with the goal of creating a low-cost seaplane that would use the ground-effect to extend its range. The program aims to carry 90 tons over 6,500 nautical miles (12,000 km), operate at sea without ground-based maintenance, and use low-cost materials.

In 2025, reports of a Chinese 'Ekranoplan' surfaced in Naval News magazine. The aircraft features several design elements from the Ekranoplan design:

- Flying boat hull with a distinctive T-tail arrangement with two vertical stabilizers.
- Comparatively short wingspan and large tail
- Four jet engines mounted above the wing have slightly flattened nozzles suggesting downward angled thrust. The engines may have a second scoop intake above the main intake.

This has caused significant concerns in Taiwan, which believes that this craft is targeted to ferry People's Liberation Army soldiers across the Taiwan Strait.

REGENT Craft (Regional Electric Ground Effect Naval Transport) is a US company that uses a standard hull for water operations, with fore- and aft-mounted hydrofoil units that lift the craft out of the water during takeoff. The design is used in the 12-seater 180 mile range REGENT Viceroy and 100-seater REGENT Monarch. In 2021 Brittany Ferries announced that they were looking into using REGENT for cross-English Channel services. Southern Airways Express placed firm orders to operate along Florida's east coast. In May 2024, REGENT announced financing of $145m of a required $700M to operate 25 REGENT craft in New Zealand.

In March 2025, REGENT completed its first taxi test of a full-sized vehicle that carried passengers. In August 2025, REGENT announced plans to deliver its first Monarchs to United Marine Egypt (UME) shipping by 2030. The Viceroy completed hydrofoil tests in June 2025, but suffered a crash while foil testing in October. In April 2026, REGENT completed the maiden flight of Squire, its autonomous electric variant. On September 30, 2026, the company completed a public demonstration flight of a Seaglider.

In 2026, mobility brand Navee introduced its WaveFly 5X GEV two-passenger GEV. It uses a dual propeller, tandem dual-wing and a carbon fiber fuselage. It reaches 85 km/h (53 mph). Maximum payload is 140 kg (309 lb). It can travel up to 80 km (50 miles) on a charge.

Iran operates the Bavar-2, a low-signature. 1-2 seat scout and patrol platform.

Airfish-8 is a 8-passenger (2 crew) twin 500 cu. in. V8 GEV. Top speed is 90 knots (104 mph/167 km/h). It is not yet in service.

== See also ==
- Aerodynamically alleviated marine vehicle
- Flying Platform
- Ground effect (aerodynamics)
- Ground-effect train
- Hovercraft
- List of ground-effect vehicles
- Surface effect ship
- Caspian Sea Monster

	Aerostat	Aerodyne		
	Lift: Lighter than air gas	Lift: Fixed wing	Lift: Unpowered rotor	Lift: Powered rotor
Unpowered free flight	(Free) balloon	Glider	Helicopter, etc. in autorotation	(None – see note 2)
Tethered (static or towed)	Tethered balloon	Kite	Rotor kite	(None – see note 2)
Powered	Airship	Airplane, ornithopter, etc.	Autogyro	Gyrodyne, helicopter
