= Rhein Flugzeugbau RW 3 Multoplan =

RW 3 Multoplan
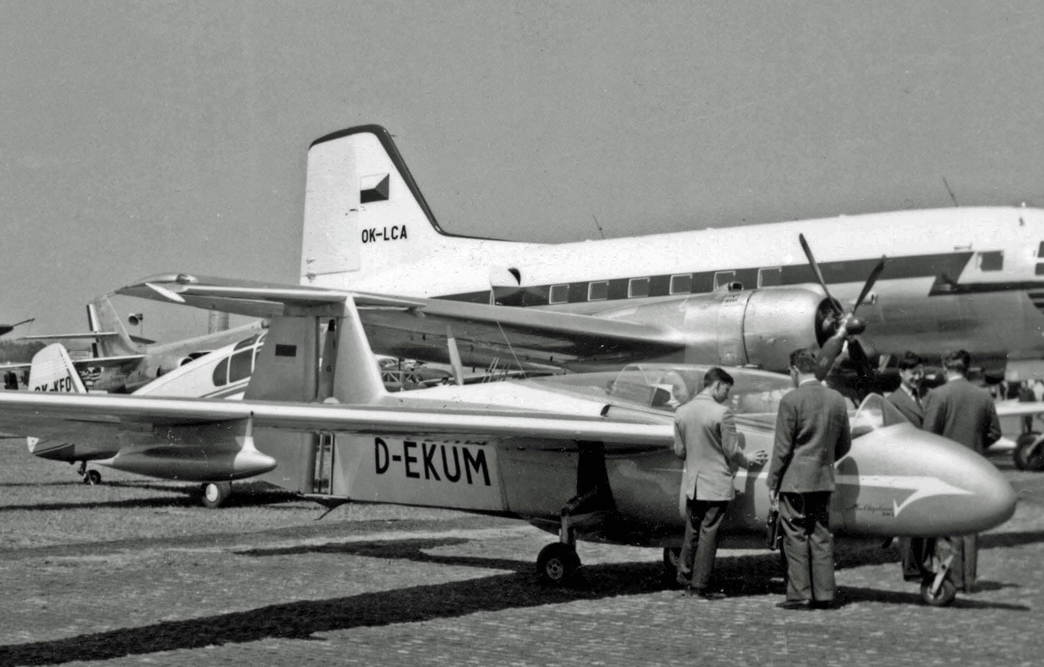
- The second prototype RW 3 Multoplan exhibited at the 1957 Paris Air Show

General information
- Type: Two-seat light pusher aircraft
- National origin: Germany
- Manufacturer: Rhein Flugzeugbau GmbH
- Designer: Hanno Fischer
- Primary user: private pilot owners
- Number built: 27

History
- Manufactured: 1958–1961
- Introduction date: 1958
- First flight: 1956

The Rhein Flugzeugbau RW 3 Multoplan is a two-seat light pusher configuration aircraft that was produced in small numbers by Rhein Flugzeugbau GmbH between 1958 and 1961.

== Design ==
The prototype RW 3 Multoplan was designed by Hanno Fischer who founded Rhein-West-Flug Fischer in 1955 in order to test the aerodynamic principles that he propounded. These were first tested in the Fibo 2a light aircraft. This was followed by the first RW 3A Multoplan D-EJAS which was a tandem two-seat light aircraft of mixed construction with a high aspect ratio wing, retractable tricycle undercarriage and a T-tail. The 65 h.p. Porsche 678/0 engine was buried in the centre fuselage and drove a pusher propeller mounted in a vertical slot between the fin and rudder. The two occupants were provided with dual controls and were accommodated beneath a long blister canopy. A second RW 3A-V2 was built and tested.

== Development and production ==
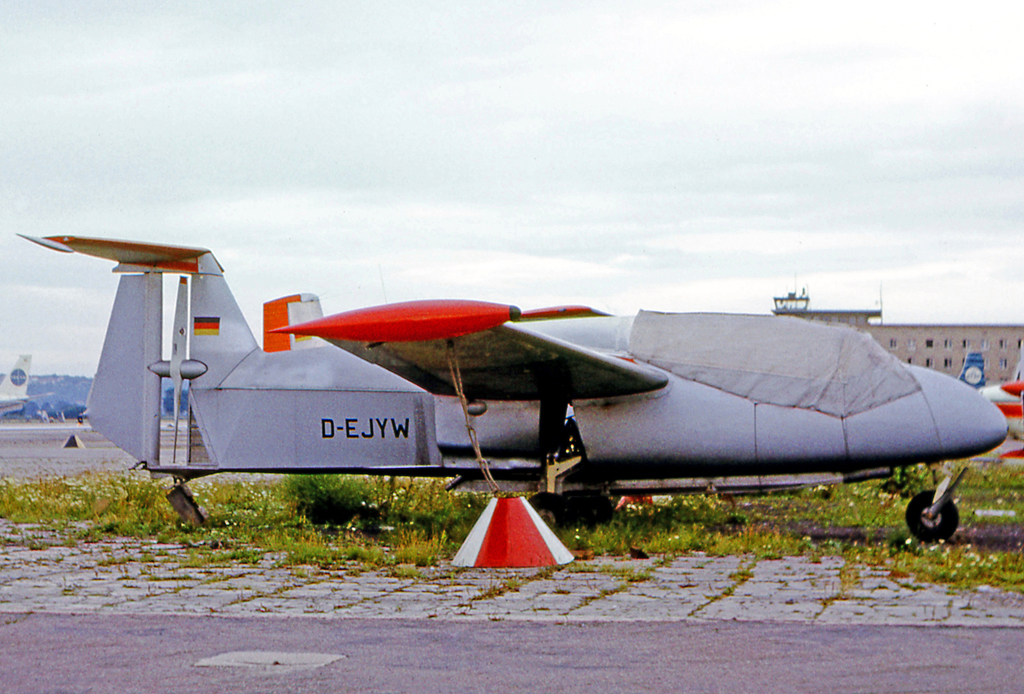
RW 3.P75 Multoplan No. 22 at Stuttgart Echterdingen airport in 1965 showing the propeller layout within the vertical fin

Fischer granted a production licence to Rhein Flugzeugbau GmbH (RFB) who built an initial batch of Multoplans at their factory at Krefeld-Uerdingen. The first production aircraft was flown on 8 February 1958 and this and all subsequent machines were designated RW 3.P75 to identify the Porsche 75 h.p. 678/4 engine which was fitted. RFB built a total of 22 Multoplans and abandoned a further three when production was discontinued in 1961. One further example was built by an amateur constructor.

RFB also built two examples of a higher-powered version, the RW 3C-90 Passat and on these and all other RW 3s, they offered optional wingtip extension panels which enabled the Multoplan to be flown as a power-assisted sailplane. The extensions increased the span from 34 ft 9 ins to 50 ft 6 in.

== Operational history ==
The Multoplan was mainly operated by private pilot owners. Two examples remained operational on the German civil aircraft register in 2009 and two aircraft were exhibited in German aviation museums including D-EIFF displayed in the Deutsches Technikmuseum in the centre of Berlin.

== Variants ==
(per Simpson)

RW.3-A
two prototypes powered by 65 hp (48 kW) Porsche 678/0 engine.
RW.3-A2
extended wing motor-glider with 15.40 m (50 ft 6 in) span wings.
RW.3-A3
standard production light aircraft version with 10.4 m (34 ft) span wings and auxiliary fuel tanks at the wing-tips.
RW.3-P75
22 production aircraft, and one amateur-built, powered by 75 hp (56 kW) Porsche 678/4 engine.
RW.3-B
glider version with wings extended to 15.40 m (50 ft 6 in). Aspect ratio 12.
RW 3C-90 Passat
two aircraft retrofitted with a 90 hp (67 kW) engine, then a 150 hp (112 kW) Lycoming O-320 with a Hartzell constant speed propeller.

== Specifications (RW 3.P75) ==
Data from Green

General characteristics

- Crew: 1
- Capacity: 1
- Length: 24 ft 4 in (7.42 m)
- Wingspan: 34 ft 9 in (10.59 m)
- Height: 8 ft 2 in (2.49 m)
- Wing area: 151 sq ft (14.0 m^{2})
- Empty weight: 1,323 lb (600 kg)
- Gross weight: 1,894 lb (859 kg)
- Powerplant: 1 × Porsche 678/4 4-cylinder air-cooled piston, 75 hp (56 kW)

Performance

- Maximum speed: 130 mph (210 km/h, 110 kn)
- Cruise speed: 112 mph (180 km/h, 97 kn)
- Range: 500 mi (800 km, 430 nmi)
- Endurance: 5 hours
- Service ceiling: 14,700 ft (4,500 m)
- Rate of climb: 492 ft/min (2.50 m/s)
