= Collins X-112 =

1960s American experimental ground-effect vehicle

X-112

General information
- Type: Ground effect vehicle
- National origin: United States
- Manufacturer: Collins Radio Company
- Designer: Alexander Lippisch
- Number built: 1

History
- First flight: 1963
- Developed into: RFB X-113

The Collins X-112 was an experimental two-seat ground-effect vehicle, designed by Alexander Lippisch in the United States in the early 1960s to test his thick reverse delta wing concept.

== Design and development ==
Lippisch's development of his Aerofoil Boat, a ground-effect vehicle for use over water, began whilst he was working in the aviation division of the Collins Radio Company in Cedar Rapids, Iowa, US. The Collins X-112 was built to test the concept.

The Airfoil Boat was an inverse-delta aircraft, that is, it had a wing which was triangular in plan but with a straight, unswept leading edge. Combined with strong anhedral, this layout produces stable flight in ground effect. Specifically, it is claimed that it is stable in pitch and also that it can fly in ground effect at altitudes up to about 50% of its span, allowing it to operate over rough water. This contrasts with the lower-aspect-ratio square wing of the ekranoplans, which leaves ground effect at only 10% of span, limiting them to the calmer waters of lakes and rivers.

Its fuselage was conventional, with flat sides and rounded decking. The nose-mounted single engine was of very low power, only 25 hp (19 kW). Two open cockpits were arranged in tandem, both over the wing. Aft of the trailing edge root the bottom of the fuselage rose strongly to carry a tall, broad fin and rudder. The X-112 had a T-tail, carrying elevators. Its thick airfoil wings were low-mounted, each with a tip float or "pontoon", which in combination with the strong anhedral kept the fuselage well clear of the water surface. Each float carried a winglet fitted with an aileron for roll control. A retractable water-rudder, fuselage-mounted at the point at which the lower fuselage rose upwards, provided directional control on the water surface.

Tests made during 1963 began with the Airfoil Boat operated like any fast motor boat, planing on the surface. With speeds increased to around 36 mph (58 km/h) the X-112 rose clear of the surface as a ram-air air cushion or ground-effect vehicle. Solo free flights at up to 77 mph (124 km/h) were made; tests with two occupants were also conducted. "Entirely satisfactory" stability and control characteristics were reported under all these conditions. With the Airfoil Boat proved, the X-112's mission was completed, and Lippisch, suffering from cancer, left Collins Radio. He recovered sufficiently to design and build its successor, the fibreglass, more powerful X-113 with Rhein-Flugzeugbau GmbH in Germany.

== Specifications ==
Data from Jane's All the World's Aircraft

General characteristics

- Crew: One or two
- Length: 25 ft 0 in (7.62 m)
- Wingspan: 14 ft 0 in (4.27 m)
- Wing area: 110 sq ft (10 m^{2})
- Empty weight: 370 lb (168 kg)
- Gross weight: 710 lb (322 kg)
- Powerplant: 1 × unknown, tractor configuration , 25 hp (19 kW)
- Propellers: fixed pitch

Performance

- Maximum speed: 77 mph (124 km/h, 67 kn) in free flight, flown solo
- Take-off speed: 35—38 mph (55—61 km/h)

== Sources ==
- "The aerodynamics of the unconventional air vehicles of A. Lippisch", Henry V. Borst and Associates, 1980
- US Patent 3190582 Ground Effect Aircraft with some X-112 characteristics [archive]
- "The Aerofoil Boat X-112", Collins Video (https://www.youtube.com/watch?v=wlIK-xViG_4 [archive])
