= RFB X-113 =

Experimental German ground-effect vehicle

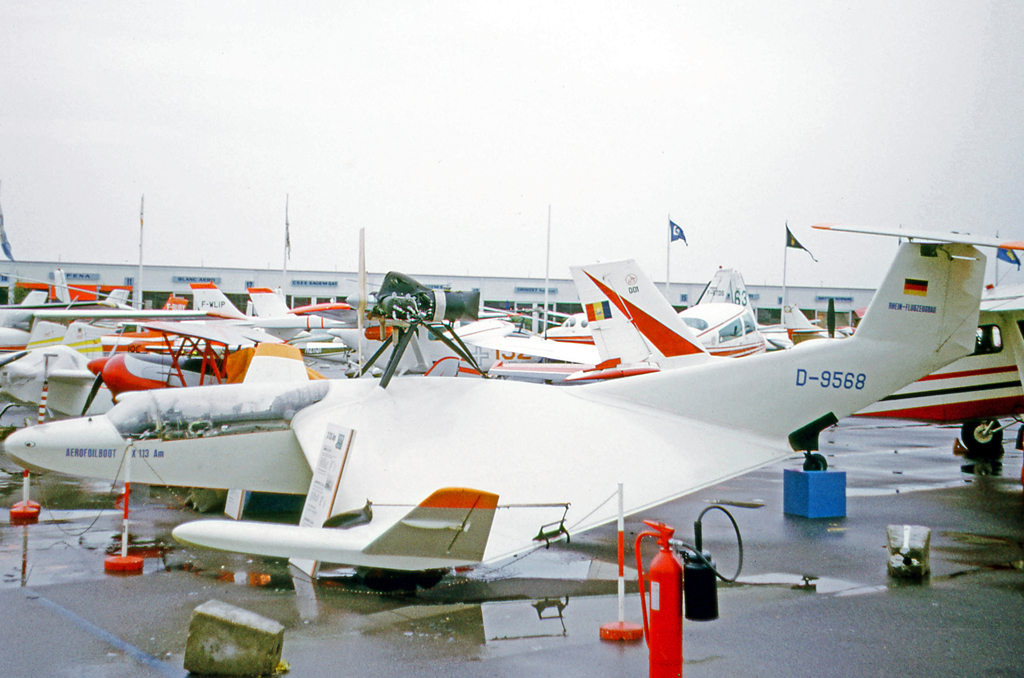
- The RFB X-113 Aerofoil Boat exhibited at the 1973 Paris Air Show at Le Bourget Airport

General information
- Type: Ground-effect vehicle
- National origin: Germany
- Manufacturer: Rhein Flugzeugbau (RFB)
- Designer: Alexander Lippisch
- Number built: 1

History
- First flight: October 1970
- Developed from: Collins X-112
- Developed into: RFB X-114

The RFB X-113 Aerofoil Boat was an experimental ground-effect vehicle intended to work over water. It was one of three such aircraft designed by Alexander Lippisch in the 1960s and early 1970s. The X-113 first flew in 1970; only one was built.

== Design and development ==
Lippisch's development of his Aerofoil Boat, a ground-effect vehicle for use over water, began whilst he was working in the aviation division of the Collins Radio Company in Cedar Rapids, Iowa, US. The first test of concept was the Collins X-112, flown in the mid-1960s. In 1967 development was continued in collaboration with Rhein-Flugzeugbau (RFB) in Germany, funded by the German government. This resulted in the X-113.

The X-113 was an inverse delta aircraft; that is, it had a wing which was triangular in plan but with a straight, unswept leading edge. Combined with strong anhedral, this layout produces stable flight in ground effect. Specifically, it is claimed that it is stable in pitch and also that it can fly in ground effect at altitudes up to about 50% of its span, allowing it to operate over rough water. This contrasts with the lower aspect ratio square wing of the Ekranoplans which leaves ground effect at only 10% of span, limiting them to the calmer waters of lakes and rivers.

The Aerofoil Boat was built using glassfibre sandwiches with foam or tube cores. Its wing was set high on the fuselage, with swept fins at the tips inclined at about 60°, carrying short ailerons. The tips also carried long, wide planing floats which projected a long way forward of the leading edge to support the fuselage stably above the surface when on water. Forward of the wings the fuselage was flat sided and quite shallow, so the pilot was semi-recumbent under a long canopy. Aft, a long dorsal fin extends to a T tail with rudder and horizontal stabiliser.

The Aerofoil Boat was powered by a Nelson flat four engine derated to 30 kW (40 hp), driving a two blade, wooden, tractor propeller. The engine was mounted uncowled over the fuselage near mid-chord on a pylon constructed from three pairs of narrow angle V-struts.

The first flight was made in October 1970 on Lake Constance and the initial tests to explore the performance of the Aerofoil Boat were also done there. These were deemed satisfactory and later flights over the North Sea showed that it could be operated over rough water. It also demonstrated its ability to fly out of ground effect, reaching at least 457 m (1,500 ft). Flight tests continued at least until 1974 and possibly later. The X-113 was displayed in public at the Paris Salon in May 1973.

== Specifications (X-113 Am) ==
Data from Jane's All the World's Aircraft 1974/5.

General characteristics

- Crew: One
- Length: 8.43 m (27 ft 8 in)
- Wingspan: 5.89 m (19 ft 4 in)
- Height: 2.07 m (6 ft 9 in)
- Empty weight: 255 kg (562 lb)
- Gross weight: 345 kg (761 lb)
- Powerplant: 1 × Nelson H63-CP flat four, 30 kW (40 hp) derated from 36 kW (48 hp)
- Propellers: 2-bladed, 1.17 m (3 ft 10 in) diameter wooden, tractor

Performance

- Cruise speed: 80 km/h (50 mph, 43 kn)
- Service ceiling: 460 m (1,500 ft) out of ground effect, at least
- Take-off speed: 40 km/h (25 mph)
- Efficient cruise height: 175 mm (7 in)
- Ground effect limit: 3 m (118 in) approximately, 50% of span

== Video ==
"The aerofoil Boat", Lippisch research Corporation (https://www.youtube.com/watch?v=gnflnBF7jWk)
