= Rhein-Flugzeugbau =

German aircraft manufacturer

Rhein-Flugzeugbau GmbH (RFB)
- Industry: Aerospace
- Founded: 1955
- Defunct: 1993
- Fate: Out of business
- Headquarters: Krefeld and Mönchengladbach, West Germany
- Products: Light aircraft

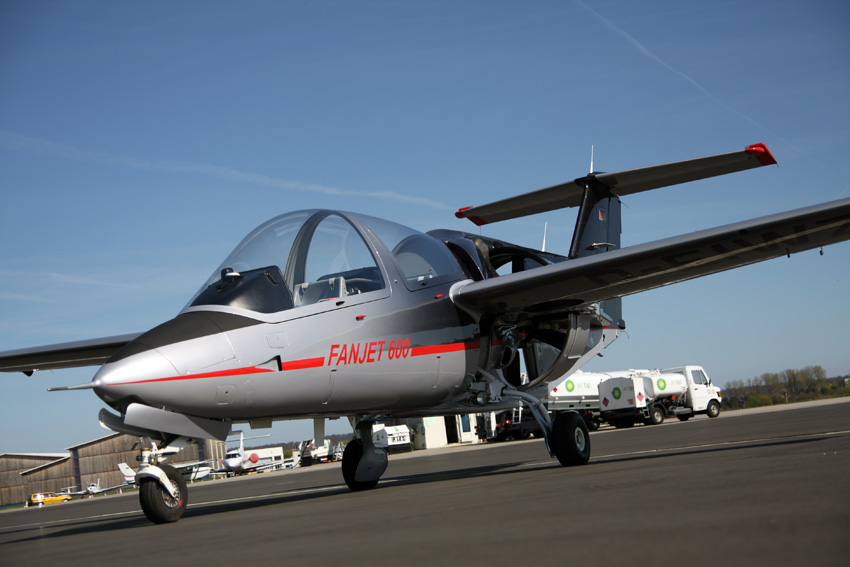
Fanjet

Rhein-Flugzeugbau GmbH (RFB) was a German aircraft manufacturer. The company was established at Krefeld, Germany in 1955, and later moved to Mönchengladbach.

Due to insolvency of its parent company, ABS International, in 1993 RFB became unable to pay its creditors and the company wound down operations and was liquidated by 2006.

== Aircraft ==
- 1955 Rhein Flugzeugbau RW 3 Multoplan
- 1960 Rhein-Flugzeugbau RF-1
- 1970 RFB X-113
- 1973 RFB/Grumman American Fanliner
- 1977 RFB X-114 — ground effect vehicle
- 1982 RFB Fantrainer — basic two-seat trainer powered by ducted fan
