= Raketa (hydrofoil) =

Soviet hydrofoil boats

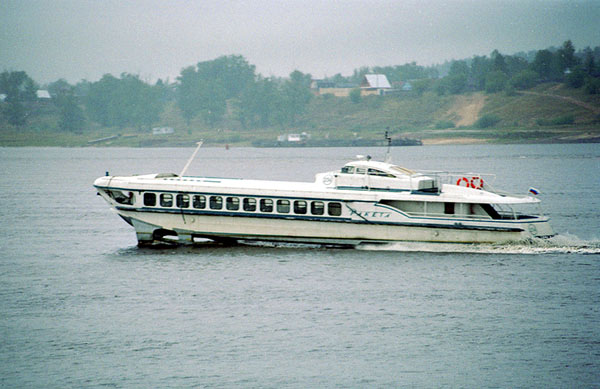
- Raketa-234 on the Volga River, 2004

Class overview
- Builders: Krasnoye Sormovo, Sormovo, Nizhny Novgorod
- Built: 1957–1970s

General characteristics
- Type: Hydrofoil riverboat
- Displacement: 18 t (light), 23.5 t (loaded)
- Length: 26.9 m (88 ft 3 in)
- Beam: 5 m (16 ft 5 in)
- Draft: 1.8 m (5 ft 11 in) displacement mode; 1.1 m (3 ft 7 in) foilborne
- Propulsion: 900–1,000 hp (671–746 kW) (depending on the model), propeller
- Speed: 60–65 km/h (37–40 mph) cruising; 70 km/h (43 mph) maximum
- Capacity: 64 or 66 passengers (depending on the model)

Raketa (Russian: Раке́та, lit. 'Rocket') was the first type of hydrofoil boats commercially produced in the Soviet Union. First planned in the late 1940s as "project 340" by chief designer Rostislav Alexeyev, the vessels were manufactured from 1957 until the early 1970s.

The first model, Raketa-1, was built by Krasnoye Sormovo (Красное Сормово) shipbuilding plant in Sormovo, Nizhny Novgorod (Нижний Новгород). On its maiden voyage, on 25 August 1957, it carried 30 passengers from Nizhny Novgorod to Kazan (420 km) in seven hours.

Raketa boats were soon in wide commercial service on the Volga River and elsewhere in the Soviet Union. To this day, the name is often used generically in Russian for all hydrofoil river boats. Later designs include the Meteor and Kometa types, among many others.

There were several versions of project 340 vessels: project 340, project 340E and project 340ME.

== Operators ==
=== Austria ===
- "Dolphin"

=== Cambodia ===
- daily service between Phnom Penh and Siem Reap

=== England ===
- River Thames

=== Finland ===
In Finland the traffic with project 340 vessel started in 1962, when the cities of Lahti and Jyväskylä had a joint-venture company, which bought one vessel. They prolonged the operations until 1983. After that the ownership was transferred to the private persons. The first name of the vessel was Tehi due to the one part of the southernmost Päijänne, Vesijärvi. Later the hydrofoils were taken off. Later M/S Tehi became M/S Suvi-Tuuli.

==== M/S Tehi ====
M/S Tehi started its operations in 1962. Later the M/S Tehi was renamed as M/S Suvi-Tuuli (without hydrofoils):Lake Päijänne cities of Lahti and Jyväskylä 1962–1983, Pyhäjärvi 2008, river Kokemäenjoki 2009-

==== M/S Rosetta ====
M/S Rosetta is Raketa 314, which was bought from Tartu of Estonia in 1993. From 1995 to 2005 it was operated under the name M/S Suvijet. It was bought from Estonia and has been operated in Lake Päijänne for Royal Cruises since 2005 after the second renaming as M/S Rosetta. Raketa-314 was built in Feodocija in 1963. It may not prolong the chartered trips on Lake Päijänne after its sale. The home harbour of M/S Rosetta is in Lahti.

The vessel does not have its original engine just like M/S Suvi-Tuuli does not have. Both of the vessels has a MAN 2842 LYE. The highest speeds are from 29 to 32 knots. During the renovation the steering was changed from the back side to the front.

=== Hungary ===
Hungarian shipping company MAHART operated 3 Raketa type hydrofoils boats named Sirály (seagull in Hungarian) I, II and III. Sirály I (originally "Raketa 283") served from 1962 to 1983. On the 5th September 1983 she collided with a barge near Vienna, causing the death of two passengers with nine others seriously injured. After the accident she was scrapped. Sister ship Sirály II (originally "Raketa 291") served from 1962 to 1983 on the Danube river, after that it was transferred to Lake Balaton and scrapped after 1988. Sirály III was originally built Czechoslovakia in 1967, but instead it was bought by DDSG, where it served under the name "Delphin" until the early 1970s, when it was acquired by MAHART. Until 1987 it served on the Danube river and transferred to Lake Balaton in 1987. Scrapped after 1992.

=== Netherlands ===
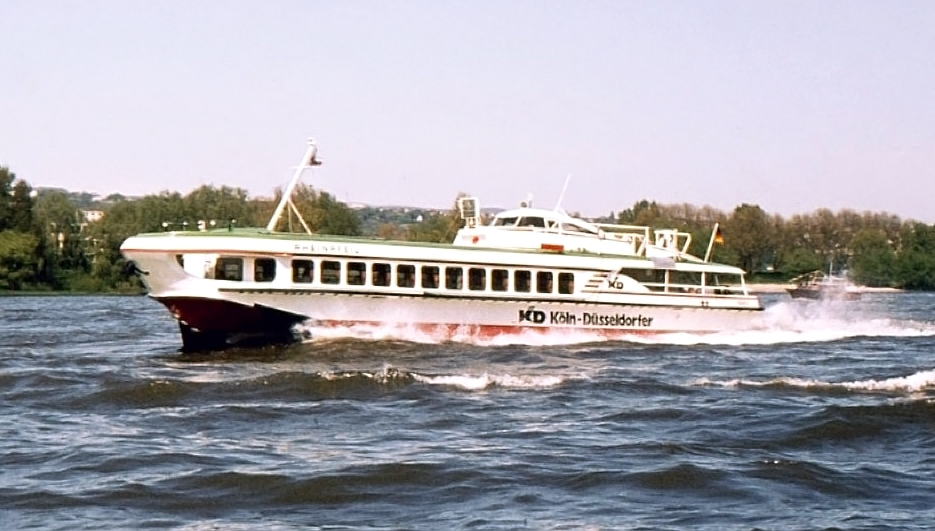
Rheinpfeil in Rhein, now Raketa 72, Rotterdam

  - Raketa 72, Rotterdam (previously in Germany as "Rheinpfeil")

=== Lithuania ===
The Lithuanian remaining Raketa has been operated by the UAB "Nemuno linija" line from the Kaunas passenger dock to Nida until 2010. It had two Raketas named "Aistė" and "Lina" of which "Aistė" was renovated. Both "Aistė" and "Lina" were constructed in 1963. In June 2020 first passengers was taken from Kaunas to Nida and back current "Laivas Raketa" operator is "Vši Vandens kelias"

=== Poland ===
- in the Gdansk area (still in operation in 2005) and on Szczecin-Świnoujście cruise line

=== Romania ===
- 8 boats were imported in Romania, Express, Rapid, Sageata, Venus, Tismana, Fulger, Olanesti and Steaua.

=== Russia ===
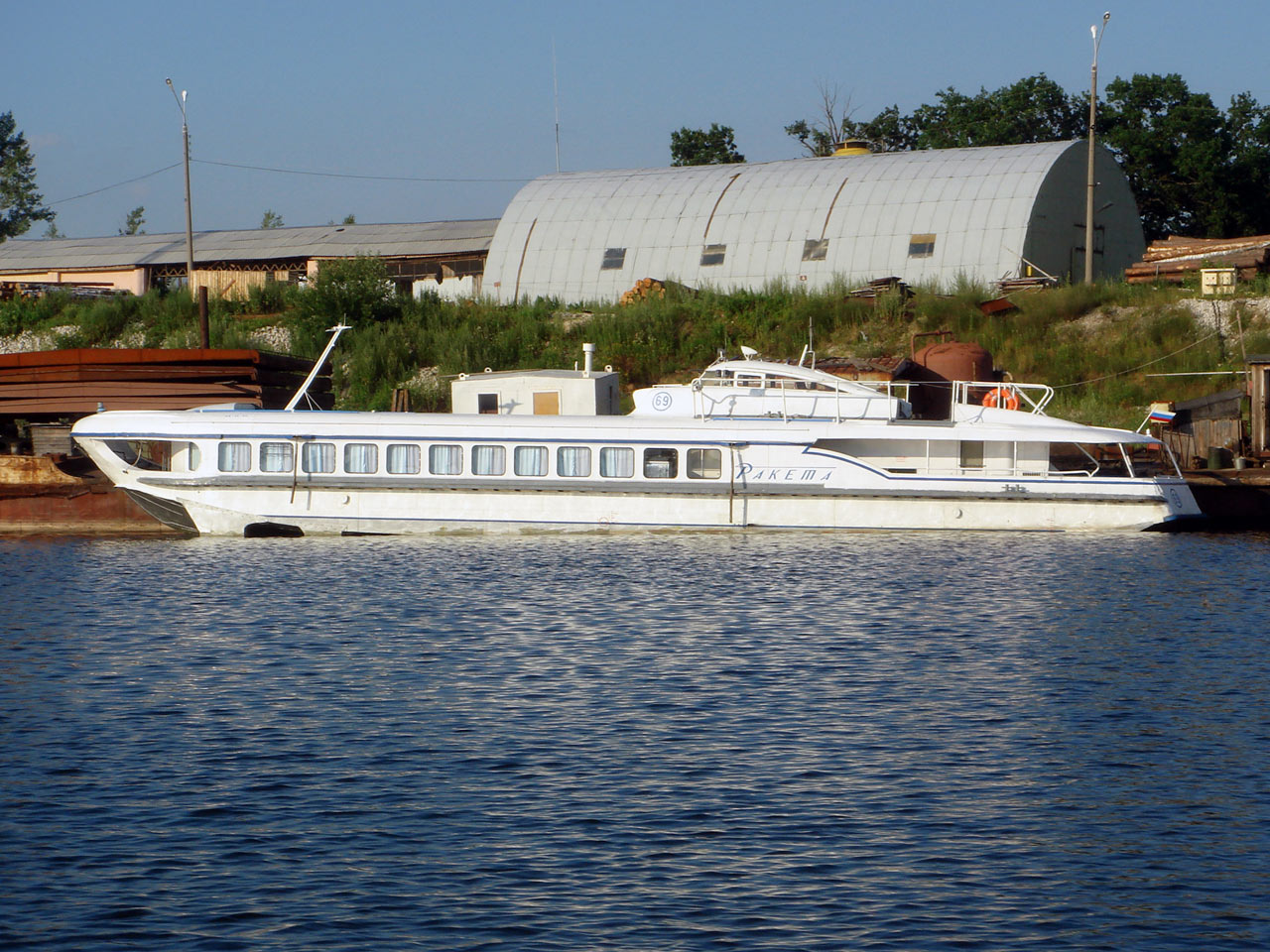
Raketa 69 in Bor

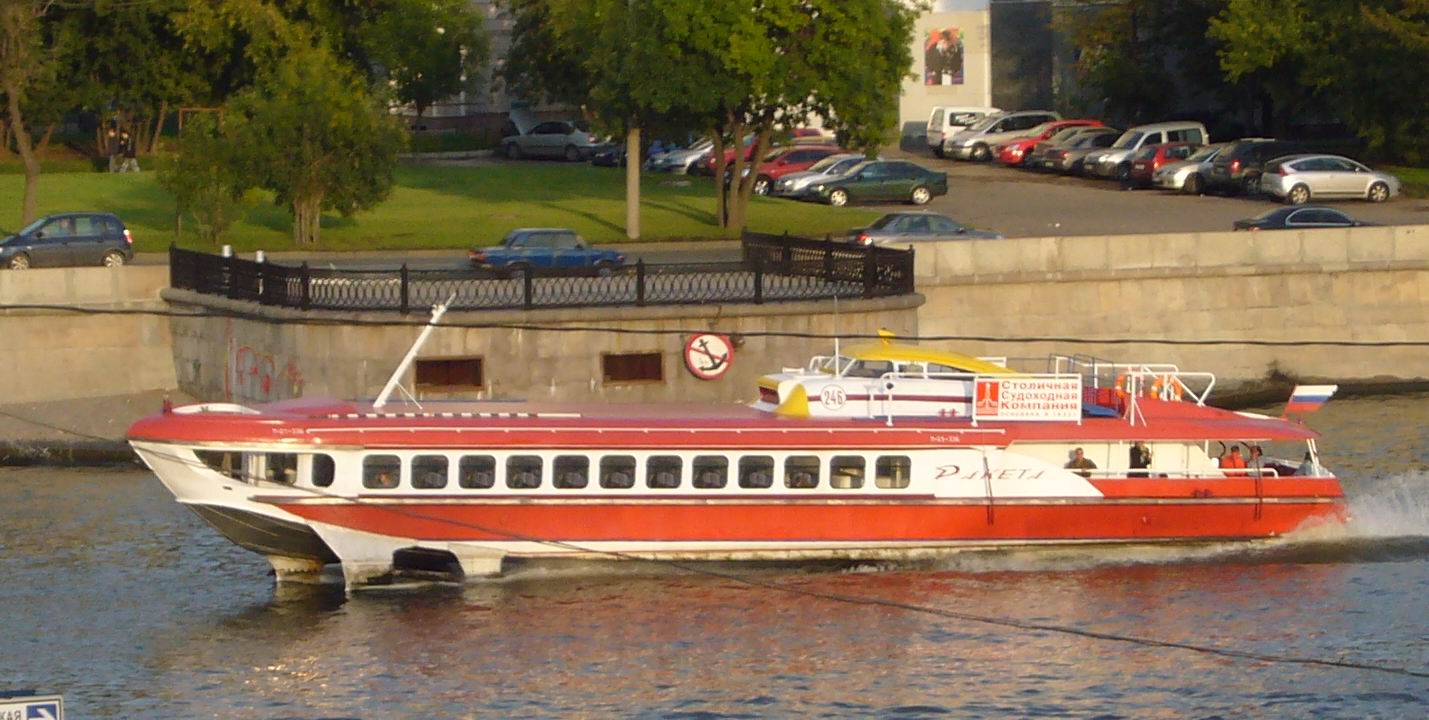
Raketa 246 in Moscow

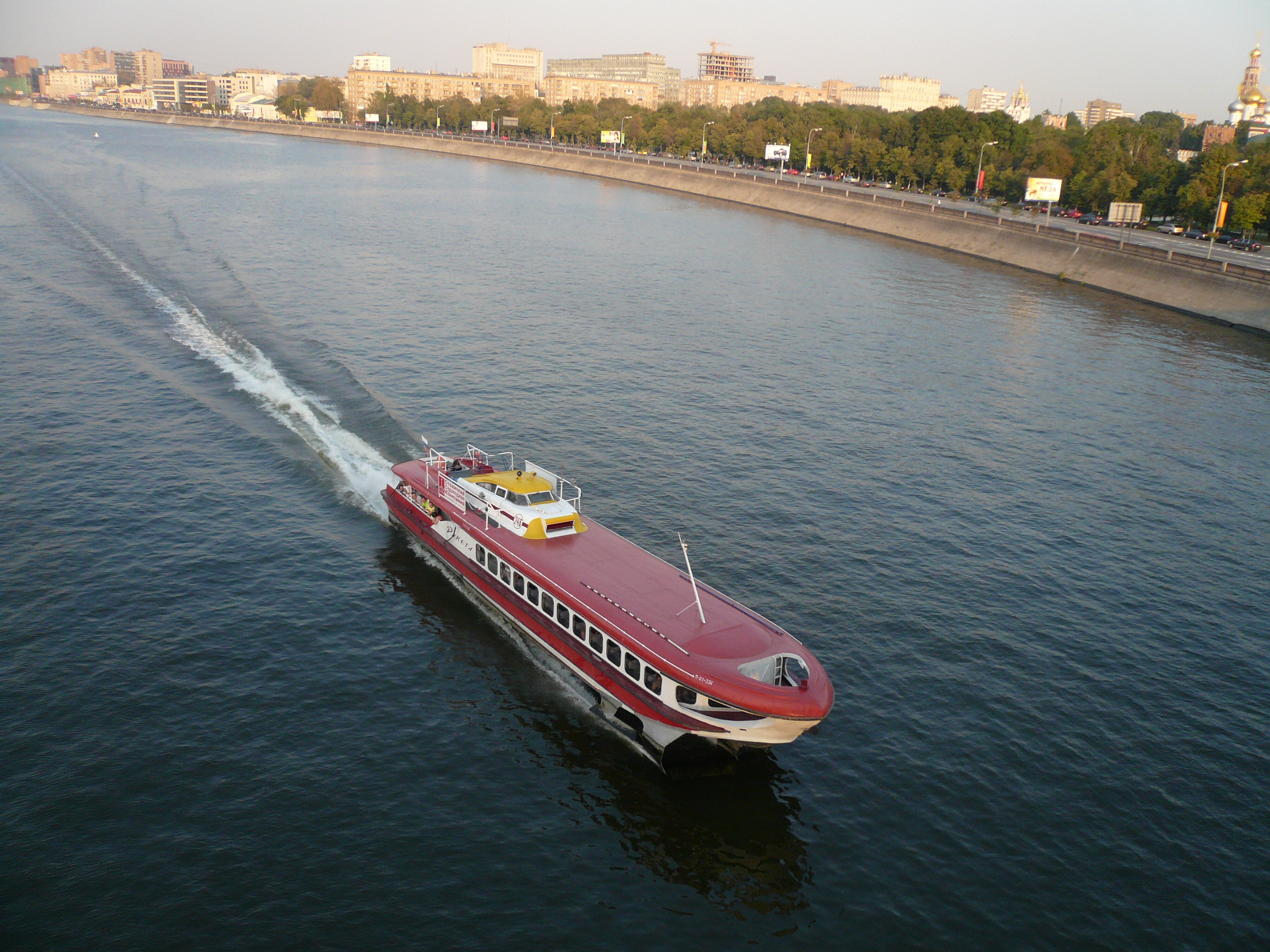
Raketa 246 in Moscow

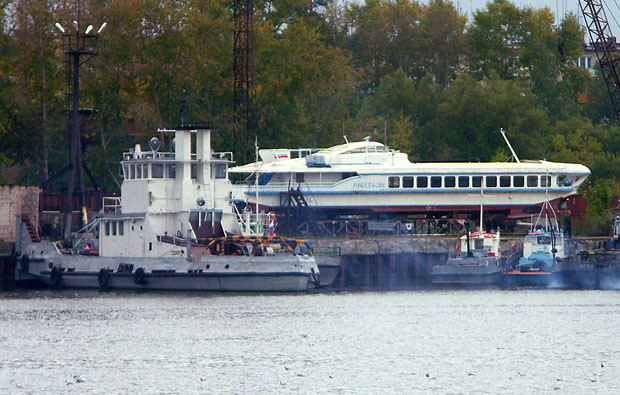
Raketa 205 in Kineshma

- FSB No.831 Feodocija built 1961
- Raketa 69, Bor
- Raketa 101 Mihail Kalinin, St. Petersburg
- Raketa 185, Moscow
- Raketa 191, Moscow
- Raketa 205, Kineshma
- Raketa 246, SSK, Moscow

=== Slovakia ===
- Raketa I
- Raketa II
- Raketa III

=== Ukraine ===
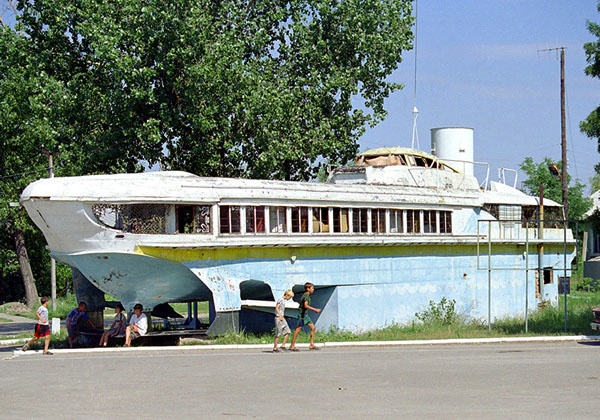
Raketa-7 in Vylkove, 2003, retired

More than 150 ships overall in use on Dnieper, Danube and Bug until 1990s, then most of these ships were sold or scrapped. Some were preserved as memorials (for example Raketa-7 in Vylkove) or as private property not available for passenger use. Some attempts were made to launch new routes in 2019–2020 with the first irregular services from Kyiv to Kaniv launched in 2021 and first regular services from Kyiv to Kaniv and Chornobyl planned for 2022. Due to Russian full-scale invasion of Ukraine in 2022 these plans were postponed indefinitely.

=== Yugoslavia ===
- Serbia, since the mid-1980s on the River Danube
- Croatia, since mid '60s. "Atlas" tourist agency used 8 of them for fast transfers, island hopping and daily excursions from Split, Zadar and Dubrovnik. Also, for excursions from Istria to Venice, Italy.

They were all named starting with "Krila" (Croatian for "wings"), i.e. Krila Dubrovnika / Wings of Dubrovnik.

Since 1988, two received engine upgrades. Old, Russian engines were swapped for Italian ones manufactured by Isotta Fraschini.

== Gallery ==
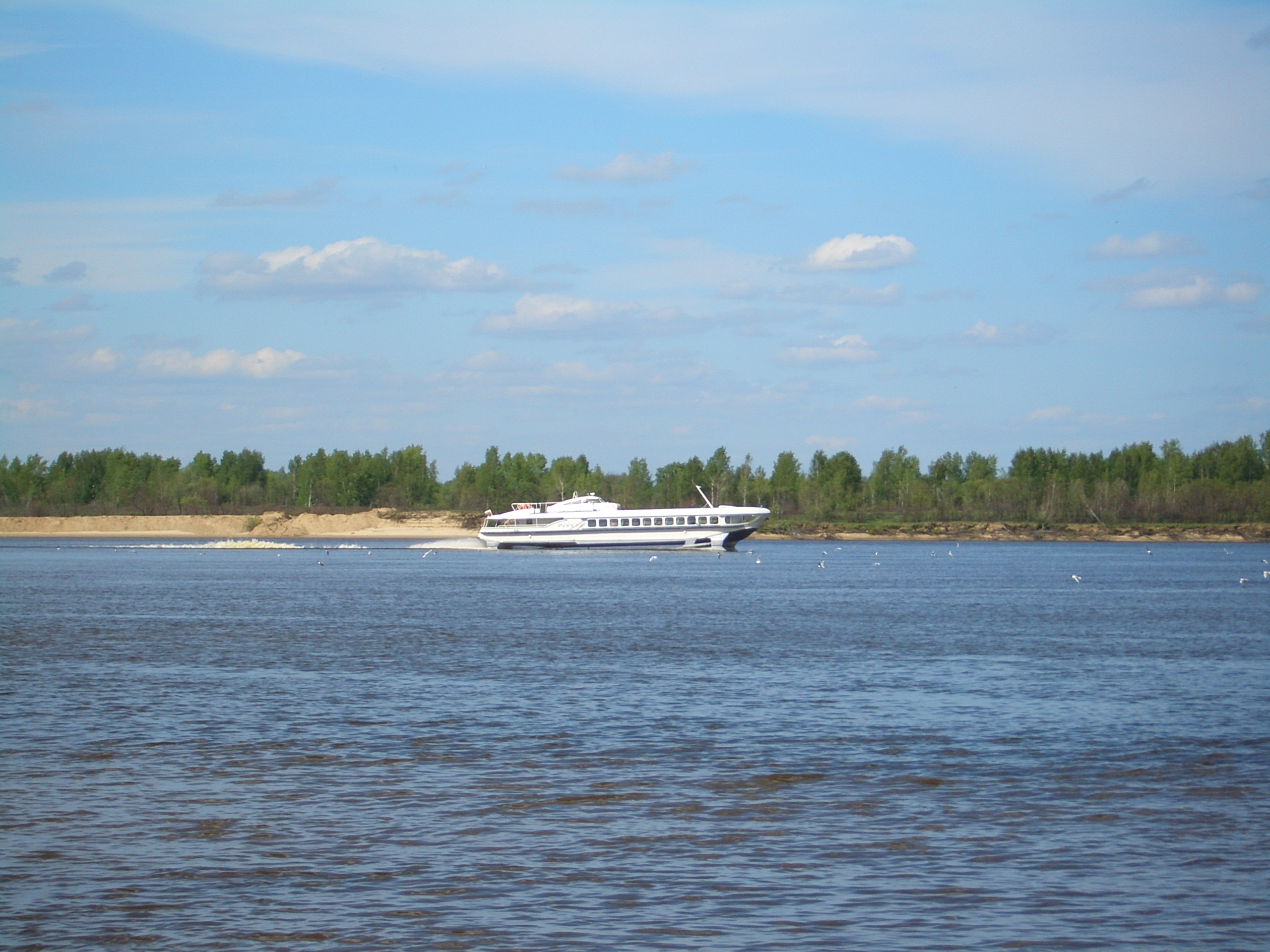
Raketa hydrofoil passes by Kstovo on the Volga River

== See also ==
- Hydrofoil
- Voskhod (hydrofoil)
