= Voskhod (hydrofoil) =

Type of passenger hydrofoil boat

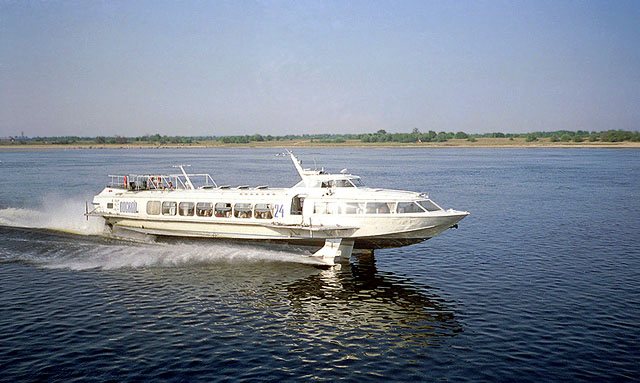
- A Voskhod type hydrofoil on the Volga river near Balakhna, 2002.

Class overview
- Builders: Morye shipbuilding plant, Feodosiya, Ukraine
- Preceded by: Raketa

General characteristics
- Type: Hydrofoil
- Length: 27.6 m (90 ft 7 in)
- Beam: 6.4 m (21 ft 0 in)
- Draft: 2.1 m (6 ft 11 in) (displacement mode); 1.1 m (3 ft 7 in) (foilborne)
- Installed power: 810 kW (1,090 hp)
- Speed: 60 km/h (32 kn; 37 mph)
- Range: 500 km (270 nmi; 310 mi)
- Capacity: 71 passengers

Voskhod (Russian: Восход, lit. 'Sunrise'), also known as "Design 352", "Design 03521" and Eurofoil, is a type of passenger hydrofoil boat built in the Soviet Union and later in Ukraine. Intended for use in rivers and lakes, good seaworthiness allows them to operate in coastal sea areas as well.

== History ==
Voskhod was designed to replace older passenger hydrofoil boats: Raketas and Meteors. The first boat of this type was built at the Morye shipbuilding plant in Feodosiya, USSR). By the early 1990s, around 150 Voskhod boats had been built. However, the production almost ceased later on, due to the problems the mostly-military manufacturer experienced adapting to the new economic situation in the country.

== Worldwide use ==
Besides the Soviet Union, Voskhods were exported to 18 other countries, including Canada, Greece, Vietnam, China, Yugoslavia, Netherlands, Austria, Hungary, Romania, Bulgaria, Thailand, Turkey. In 2002 three Voskhod-type boats (model Voskhod-2M FFF, also known as Eurofoil), were built for the Dutch public transport operator Connexxion.

In Vietnam the Voskhod boats are operating a daily route between the Cat Ba island and city of Hai Phong.

In the Netherlands, Voskhod-Eurofoil boats operated along the North Sea Canal between Amsterdam Centraal railway station and IJmuiden near the North Sea coast. The service took half an hour, and was part of the national public transport network serving both commuters and tourists. The boats were modified for the Dutch market to securely carry passengers' bicycles in racks on the upper deck.

When the line first opened in 1998, it used four Voskhods that had been previously used in Ukraine. In 2002, three new boats were built for Connexxion in Feodosiya (604, 605, 606; in the Netherlands, however, each one received a "personal" name). Connexxion then sold three of the old Voskhods, but the fourth, Annemarie, is kept by the operator as a spare boat. The service was terminated in 2014 due to a new speed limit (the reduced speed decreased the number of passengers and hence profitability of the service).
