= Meteor (hydrofoil) =

Type of passenger hydrofoil boat

The "Meteor" (Russian: Метеор) (projects 342, 342E, 342U) refers to a widely produced series of Soviet high-speed river passenger hydrofoil vessels, developed by the Gorky (now Nizhny Novgorod) Central Hydrofoil Design Bureau under the direction of Rostislav Alexeyev. Thanks to their solid seagoing characteristics, "Meteors" are capable of limited coastal voyages in near-shore maritime areas. Alongside the smaller "Raketa" hydrofoil, the "Meteor" is the most widely produced hydrofoil in both the USSR and globally, with more than 400 units built and operated in almost twenty countries across various continents.

The "Meteor" served as the basis for a range of related hydrofoils, including the smaller and similarly streamlined "Belarus" and "Voskhod" models, the larger but rarer "Sputnik" and "Burevestnik" river vessels, and the specialized ocean-going analogs "Kometa" and "Kolkhida".

== History ==
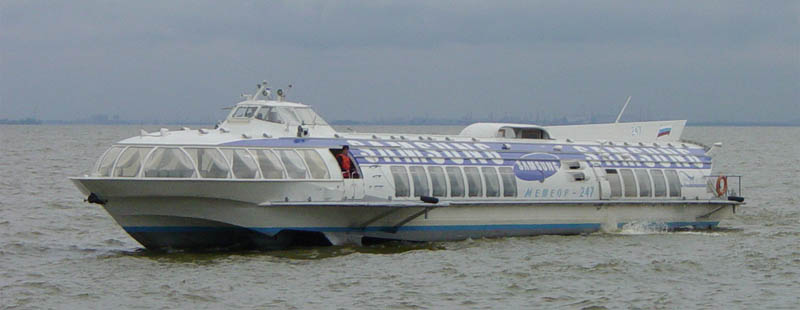
Meteor at the Peterhof, 2004

The project received official approval on May 19, 1959, and by October of the same year, the first experimental "Meteor" hydrofoil was launched. Sea trials for the vessel ran from November 1 to November 17, 1959. During trials, the initial "Meteor" — built at the Krasnoye Sormovo factory — traveled from Gorky to Feodosia, where it remained over the winter. On May 9, 1960, it began its return journey, reaching Gorky on May 14. In June 1960, the "Meteor" was presented to Nikita Khrushchev. Aircraft designer Andrei Tupolev, present at the demonstration, was so impressed by the vessel that he requested a joint piloting session with Alexeyev.

The next vessel constructed was "Meteor-2", which entered service with the Volga United Shipping Company of the Ministry of River Fleet of the RSFSR. Among its captains was Mikhail Devyatayev, a Hero of the Soviet Union and famed wartime pilot who escaped captivity by hijacking an enemy bomber.

Serial production was established at the Zelenodolsk Shipyard in Tatarstan. Between 1961 and 1999, over 400 vessels of this series were built, with two more completed in 2006. By 2007, the factory’s Meteor production line was dismantled, with a new generation of riverboats — project A45-1 — replacing it. In the 2010s, several "Meteors" were refitted at the manufacturer and in St. Petersburg, yet today the majority have been decommissioned, and their areas of operation, once widespread across major rivers and lakes, have become extremely limited.

In the USSR, nearly all "Meteors" bore numbers rather than names. In the post-Soviet era, some vessels were renamed after their creators, captains, heroes, military commanders, saints, and so forth.

Most "Meteors" were painted white, though upon request or during subsequent repaintings for certain clients, some received other liveries: for example, light green in the Netherlands originally (and in certain parts of Karelia today), white-blue-red in Slovakia and China, and red in China.

Some retired vessels have been preserved on pedestals as monument ships.

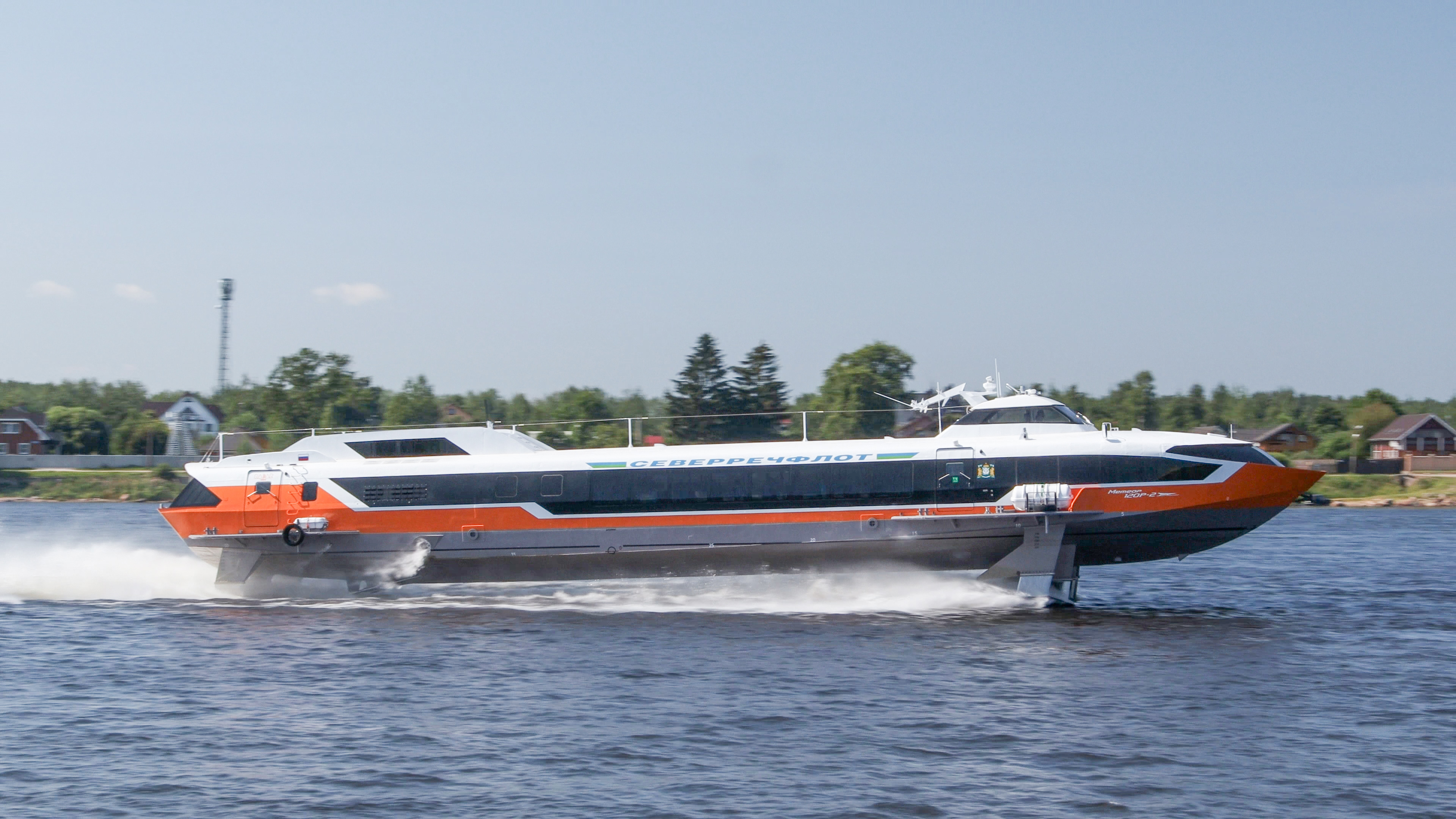
Meteor 120R on the Neva river, 2022

The hydrofoil vessel "Meteor 120R" (project 03580) is based near Nizhny Novgorod. On December 23, 2019, the lead vessel of project 03580, "Meteor 120R", was laid down at the R. E. Alexeyev Central Design Bureau, intended as the successor to the aging fleet. The lead ship was launched on August 3, 2021, with the second following on May 25, 2022.

On June 16, 2022, the innovative high-speed passenger hydrofoil "Meteor 120R" was showcased at the St. Petersburg International Economic Forum. By December that year, a total of seven ships of the project had been laid down; four were launched during 2023.

== Description ==
The "Meteor" hydrofoil of project 342E features an aluminum hull, single deck, and twin-shaft diesel propulsion. It is designed for high-speed daytime passenger transportation on navigable rivers, freshwater reservoirs, and lakes in temperate climates. A remote-control and monitoring system allows the vessel to be operated entirely from the wheelhouse.

The hydrofoil system consists of a forward and aft main wing, plus two flaps mounted on side and hull supports attached to the front wing.

=== Engines ===
Two main diesel engines with water cooling (type M-400 12ChNS18/20, both left- and right-rotating) are installed. These twelve-cylinder, four-stroke diesels are converted from aviation M-40 engines and are equipped with turbocharging and reversing clutch; each engine is rated for 1,000 hp at 1,700 rpm. The propulsion system consists of two fixed-pitch, five-bladed propellers, each 710 mm in diameter. An auxiliary diesel-generator-compressor-pump unit supports mechanical and ship needs, featuring a 12 hp diesel engine at 1,500 rpm (with both starter and manual start), a 5.6 kW generator, a compressor, and a self-priming vortex pump. Controls are located both in the wheelhouse and the engine room.

=== Power supply ===
Two traction direct current generators, each with a capacity of 1 kW at 27.5 V, are mounted on the main engines and serve as the primary power source when under way. There is an automatic system for parallel operation of the generator and batteries. For electrical supply during stops, an auxiliary direct current generator rated at 5.6 kW and 28 V is provided.

=== Passenger layout ===
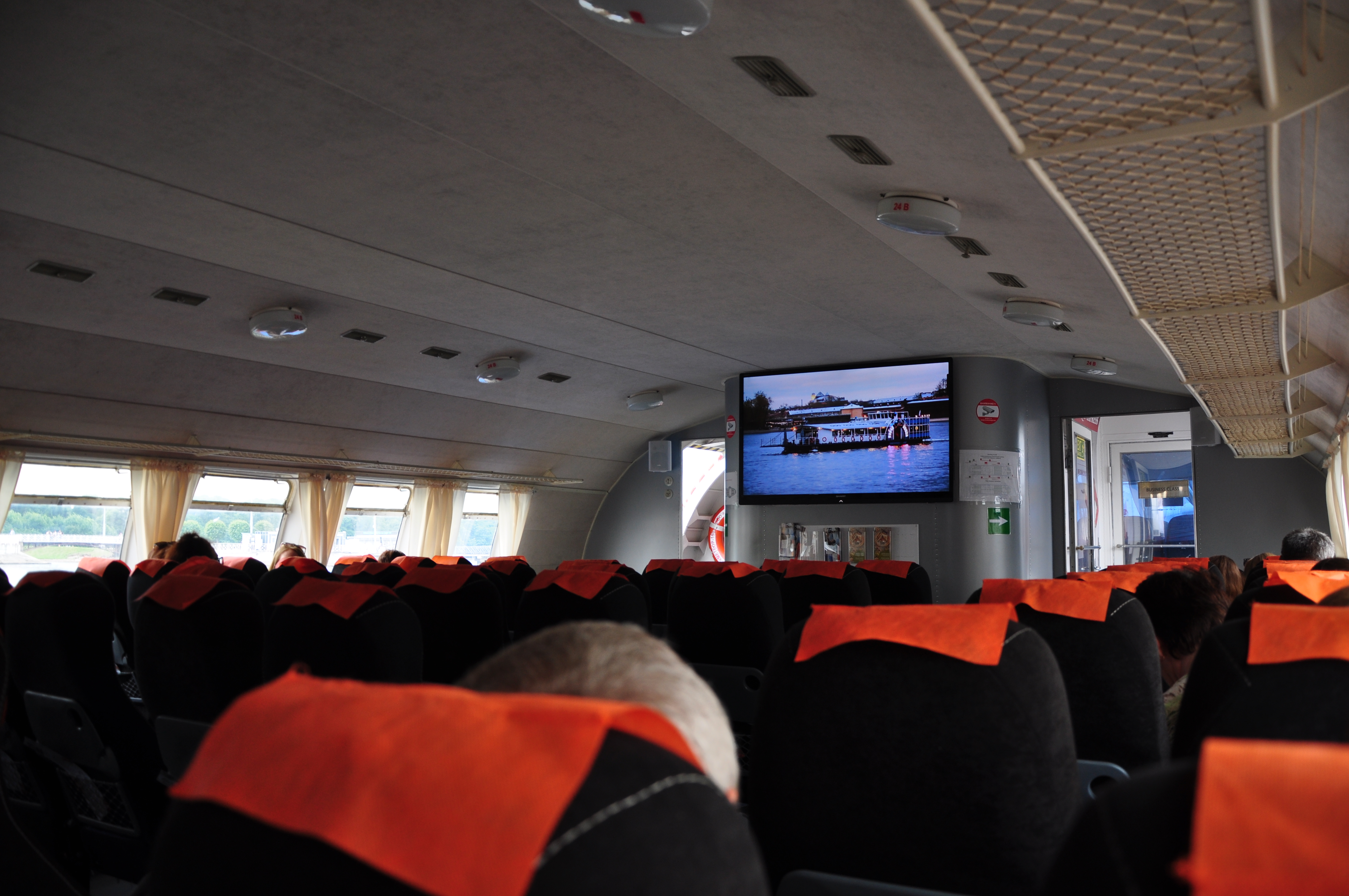
Meteor interior

Passengers are accommodated in three lounges with soft armchairs: forward (26 seats), center (44 seats), and aft (44 seats). Access between the center and aft lounges is via a covered deck (visible in photographs as a "hump"); from the deck, doors lead to the restrooms, engine room, and service facilities. The center lounge contains a buffet.
