= Experimental Craft Hydrofoil No. 4 (XCH-4) =

High speed hydrofoil of the US Navy, built 1953

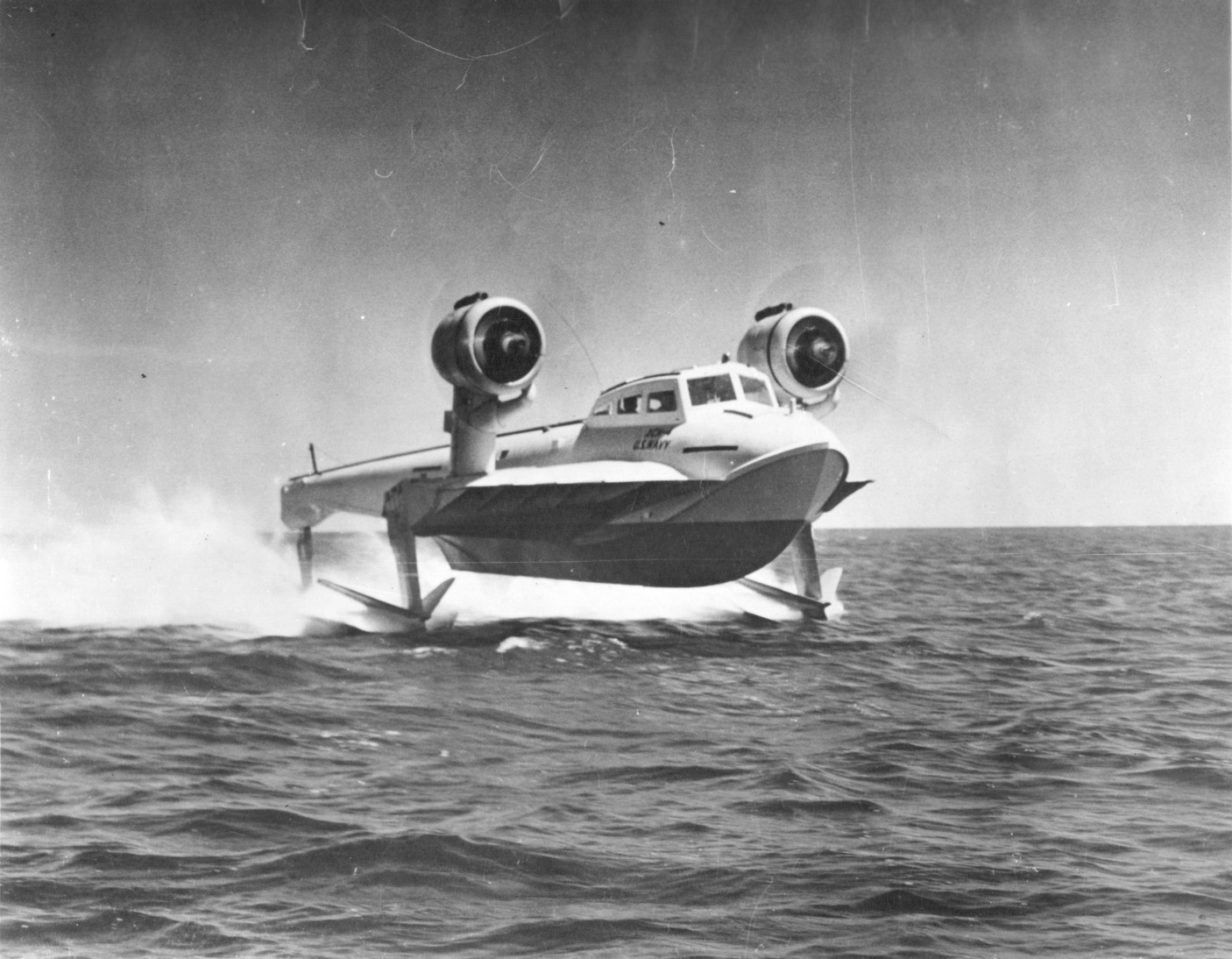
- USS XCH-4 underway

History

United States
- Builder: Dynamic Developments Inc.

General characteristics
- Displacement: 16,000 lbs
- Length: 53 ft (16 m)
- Beam: 32 ft (9.8 m)
- Propulsion: 2 Pratt and Whitney R-985 450 hp each
- Speed: Maximum 78 knots (foil-borne)

The Experimental Craft Hydrofoil No. 4 (XCH-4) was a high speed hydrofoil of the United States Navy. In 1947 the Bureau of Ships in association with the Office of Naval Research subsidized the construction of a number of small watercraft to explore several different types of foils and foil control-system configurations. The XCH-4 (sometimes referred to as "The Carl Boat") was designed by John H. Carl and built, in 1953, by Dynamic Developments Inc., a former associate of the Grumman Aircraft Engineering Corporation.

The XCH-4 employed three struts with "ladder" type hydrofoils. The foils were swept back approximately 45 degrees and have considerable dihedral providing a very stable ride even in moderately rough seas. The design eliminated drag inducing water propeller drive systems in favor of aircraft type propellers powered by two Pratt & Whitney R-985 Wasp Junior radial engines and in 1955 the vessel set a world speed record 78 knots.

== See also ==
- HD-4
- HMCS Bras d'Or (1919), auxiliary minesweeper (1939–1940)
- Bras d'Or (R-103), experimental hydrofoil (1957–1962)
