= List of large aircraft =

A size comparison of five of the largest aircraft: Airbus A380 Antonov An-225 Mriya Boeing 747-8 Hughes H-4 Hercules Stratolaunch

This is a list of large aircraft, including three types: fixed wing, rotary wing, and airships.

The US Federal Aviation Administration defines a large aircraft as any aircraft with a certificated maximum takeoff weight (MTOW) of more than 12,500 lb (5,700 kg)

The European Aviation Safety Agency (EASA) defines a large aircraft as either "an aeroplane with a maximum take-off mass of more than 12,566.35 pounds (5,700.00 kilograms) or a multi-engined helicopter."

== Fixed-wing ==
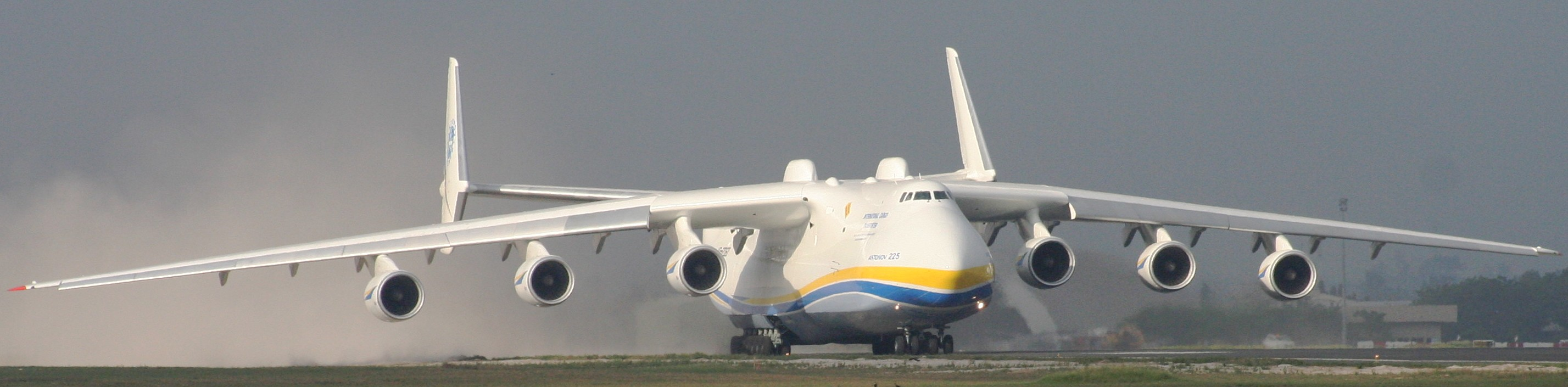
Antonov An-225

Type	First flight	Role	Built	Length	Span	MTOW	Capacity	Notes
Ilya Muromets	1913	airliner/bomber	85+	19.13 yards (17.49 meters)	32.58 yards (29.79 meters)	4.527 tons	Pax: 16	First multi-engine aircraft in serial production, Russky Vityaz development
Zeppelin-Staaken R.VI	1916	Bomber	56	24.168 yards (22.099 meters)	46.15 yards (42.20 meters)	11.613 tons		Largest WWI aircraft in regular service
Tarrant Tabor	1919	Bomber	1	24.38 yards (22.29 meters)	43.74 yards (40.00 meters)	19.97 tons	4.1 t	Crashed on first flight
Dornier Do X	12 Jul 1929	Flying boat	3	43.74 yards (40.00 meters)	52.27 yards (47.80 meters)	51.1787 tons	Pax: 100	Then longest, widest and heaviest
Kalinin K-7	11 Aug 1933	Transport	1	30.62 yards (28.00 meters)	57.96 yards (53.00 meters)	45.77 tons	Pax: 120	Widest aircraft until the Tupolev ANT-20
Tupolev ANT-20	19 May 1934	Transport	2	35.979 yards (32.899 meters)	68.8976 yards (63.0000 meters)	52.16 tons	Pax: 72	Widest and heaviest until the Douglas XB-19
Douglas XB-19	27 Jun 1941	Bomber	1	44.07 yards (40.30 meters)	70.65 yards (64.60 meters)	72.34 tons		Longest until the Laté. 631, widest until the B-36, heaviest until the Martin Mars
Messerschmitt Me 323	20 Jan 1942	Transport	198	30.84 yards (28.20 meters)	60.37 yards (55.20 meters)	42.32 tons	11.81 tons	Highest cargo capacity land-based World War II transport
Martin JRM Mars	23 Jun 1942	Flying boat	7	39.04 yards (35.70 meters)	66.71 yards (61.00 meters)	73.62 tons	14.76 tons	Heaviest until the Junkers 390, Largest serial production flying boat
Latécoère 631	4 Nov 1942	Flying boat	11	47.57 yards (43.50 meters)	62.77 yards (57.40 meters)	70.27 tons	Pax: 46	Longest until the Convair B-36
Junkers Ju 390	20 Oct 1943	Bomber	2	37.40 yards (34.20 meters)	55.01 yards (50.30 meters)	74.31 tons	9.84 tons	Heaviest until the BV 238, Junkers entry for the Amerika Bomber project
Blohm & Voss BV 238	Apr 1944	Flying boat	1	47.35 yards (43.30 meters)	65.84 yards (60.20 meters)	98.42 tons		Heaviest built during WWII, destroyed in 1945
Convair B-36	8 Aug 1946	Bomber	384	54.02 yards (49.40 meters)	76.66 yards (70.10 meters)	183.06 tons		Heaviest until the B-52, longest and widest until the Hughes H-4
Hughes H-4 Hercules (Spruce Goose)	2 Nov 1947	Flying boat	1	72.94 yards (66.70 meters)	106.95 yards (97.80 meters)	177.15 tons		Longest until the Lockheed C-5 Galaxy and widest until the Stratolaunch
Convair XC-99	23 Nov 1947	Transport	1	60.80 yards (55.60 meters)	76.66 yards (70.10 meters)	142.71 tons	44.28 tons	B-36 development, most capable transport aircraft until the An-22
Boeing B-52	15 Apr 1952	Bomber	744	53.04 yards (48.50 meters)	61.68 yards (56.40 meters)	216.525 tons		Heaviest until the XB-70, still in service
XB-70	21 Sep 1964	Bomber	2	61.68 yards (56.40 meters)	34.99 yards (31.99 meters)	242.115 tons		Heaviest until the An-22, Mach 3 prototype bomber
Antonov An-22	27 Feb 1965	Transport	68	63.32 yards (57.90 meters)	70.43 yards (64.40 meters)	246.05 tons	80 t	Heaviest until the C-5, Heaviest turboprop aircraft
Caspian Sea Monster	16 Oct 1966	Ekranoplan	1	100.61 yards (92.00 meters)	41.12 yards (37.60 meters)37.6 m	535.41 tons		Ground-effect vehicle. Heaviest and longest flying vehicle until the An-225, 1980 crash
Lockheed C-5 Galaxy	30 Jun 1968	Transport	131	82.34 yards (75.29 meters)	74.26 yards (67.90 meters)	410.41 tons	125.49 tons	Largest payload capacity until the An-124
Boeing 747	9 Feb 1969	Airliner	1557	77.32 yards (70.70 meters)	65.18 yards (59.60 meters)	406.86 tons	Pax: 550/660	Highest passenger capacity airliner until the Airbus A380
Antonov An-124	26 Dec 1982	Transport	55	75.57 yards (69.10 meters)	80.16 yards (73.30 meters)	395.65 tons	147.63 tons	Most capable transport until the An-225
Antonov An-225 Mriya	21 Dec 1988	Transport	1	91.86 yards (84.00 meters)	96.68 yards (88.40 meters)	629.89 tons	246.05 tons	Heaviest aircraft and most capable transport, destroyed in 2022
Airbus Beluga	13 Sep 1994	Outsize cargo	5	61.46 yards (56.20 meters)	48.99 yards (44.80 meters)	152.55 t	1,961.93 cubic yards (1,500.00 cubic meters)	Airbus A300 derivative, largest volume until the Dreamlifter
Airbus A380	27 Apr 2005	Airliner	254	79.51 yards (72.70 meters)	87.27 yards (79.80 meters)	565.92 tons	Pax: 850	Highest passenger capacity airliner
Boeing Dreamlifter	9 Sep 2006	Outsize cargo	4	78.41 yards (71.70 meters)	70.43 yards (64.40 meters)	358.25 tons	2,406.63 cubic yards (1,840.00 cubic meters)	Boeing 747-400 derivative, largest volume until the BelugaXL
Airbus BelugaXL	19 Jul 2018	Outsize cargo	6	69.01 yards (63.10 meters)	65.945 yards (60.300 meters)	223.41 tons	2,889.26 cubic yards (2,209.00 cubic meters)	Airbus A330 derivative, largest volume
Scaled Composites 351 Stratolaunch	13 Apr 2019	Air launch	1	79.83 yards (73.00 meters)	127.95 yards (117.00 meters)	580.68 t	246.052 t	Current heaviest and widest, prototype air-launch-to-orbit carrier

=== Projects ===
Type	Proposed	MTOW	Notes
Poll Triplane	1917 (circa)		50 m (160 ft) wingspan
Victory Bomber	1940/1941	47.2 tons	52 m (171 ft) wingspan, to carry a ten-ton earthquake bomb, rejected by the RAF
Boeing 2707 SST	1960s	301.17 tons	A 93 m-long (305 ft) Concorde answer, canceled in 1971
Lockheed CL-1201	1960s	6,318.61 tons	Nuclear-powered, 1,120 feet (340 m) wing span, airborne aircraft carrier
Boeing RC-1	1970s	1,584.57 tons	"flying pipeline", proposed before the 1973 oil crisis
Conroy Virtus	1974	379.90 tons	140 m (460 ft) wingspan, to carry Space Shuttle parts
Beriev Be-2500	1980s	2,460.57 tons	Super heavy amphibious transport aircraft
Beriev Be-5000	1980s	4,921.03 tons	Twin fuselage Be-2500
McDonnell Douglas MD-12	1990	423.21 tons	Proposed double deck airliner, canceled in mid-1990s
Boeing New Large Airplane	1990s	523.6 tons	747 replacement powered by 777 engines, canceled in the 1990s
Aerocon Dash 1.6 wingship	1990s	4,921.03 tons	US ground effect aircraft, developed with Russian consultation
Tupolev Tu-404	1990s	595.45 tons	Blended wing body airliner for 1,214 passengers, 110 m (360 ft) wingspan
Sukhoi KR-860	1990s	639.73 tons	Transport for 300 t payload or 860–1,000 passengers Double deck airliner
Skylon	1993	339.55 tons	Reusable spaceplane, cancelled in 2024
Boeing 747X	1996	465.53 tons	747-400 stretch, Airbus A3XX competitor
Boeing Pelican	2002	2,657.36 tons	Ground effect and medium altitude transport
Airbus A380-900	2006	580.68 tons	Airbus A380-800 stretch, postponed in May 2010
TsAGI HCA-LB	current	984.21 tons	Ground effect aircraft powered by LNG

== Rotary-wing ==
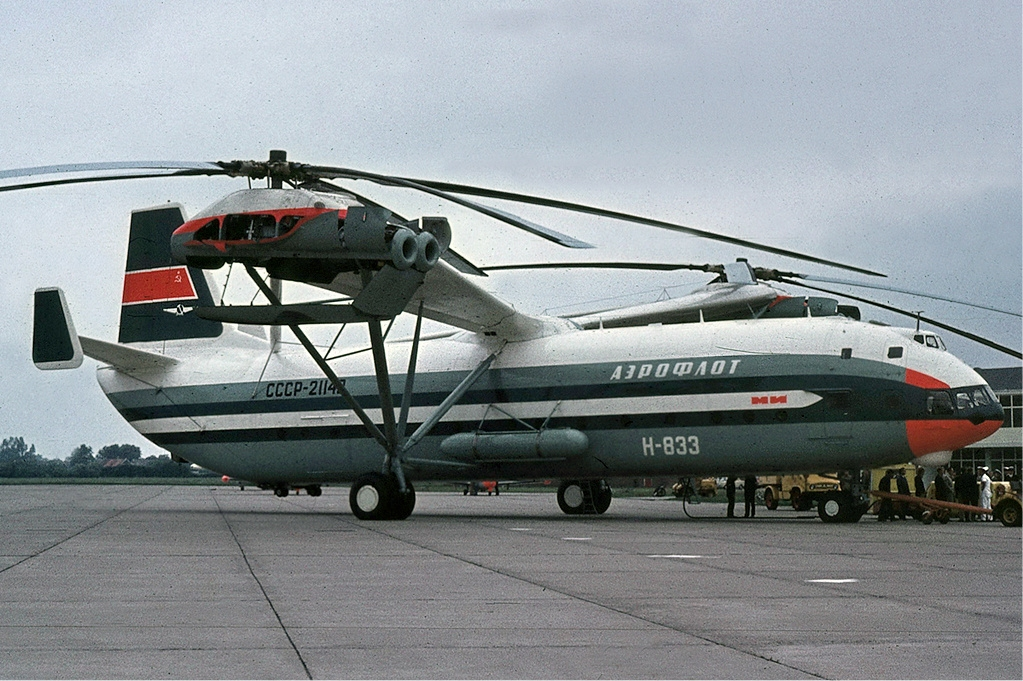
Aeroflot Mil V-12 at Groningen Airport in May 1971

Type	First flight	MTOW	Number built	Notes
Cierva W.11 Air Horse	7 December 1948	8 t	1	Three rotor helicopter
Hughes XH-17	23 October 1952	23 t	1	Prototype heavy-lift helicopter, largest rotor at 39.6 m (130 ft)
Mil Mi-6	5 June 1957	44 t	926	Heavy transport helicopter, 35 m (115 ft) rotor
Mil V-12 or Mi-12	10 July 1968	105 t	2	Largest prototype helicopter, 2 × 35 m (115 ft) rotors
Mil Mi-26	14 December 1977	56 t	316	Heaviest serial production helicopter
Fairey Rotodyne	6 November 1957	15 t	1	Largest gyrodyne. Prototype for 40 passengers
Kamov Ka-22	15 August 1959	42.5 t	4	Composite rotorcraft
Bell Boeing V-22 Osprey	19 March 1989	21.5 t	400	First operational VTOL tiltrotor

=== Proposals ===
- Yakovlev Yak-60 – Mil V-12 size helicopter design
- Yakovlev VVP-6 – Mil V-12 size helicopter design

== Lighter than air ==
Large balloons
Type	Date	Volume	Description
Preusen ("Prussia")	1901	8,400 m^{3}	German experimental prototype
CL75 AirCrane	2001	110,000 m^{3}	CargoLifter experimental prototype, approximately 120.6 tonnes with helium fill

Large airships
Type	First flight	Volume	Length	Notes
Zeppelin LZ 1	1900	11,300 m^{3}	128 m	German experimental prototype
R38 (US: ZR-2)	1921	77,100 m^{3}	212 m	UK military, built for US Navy
R100	1929	193,970 m^{3}	216 m	UK experimental passenger transport
HM Airship R101	14 Oct 1929	156,000 m^{3} (5,500,000 cu ft)	236 m	Followed by the smaller 146,000 m^{3} (5,200,000 cu ft) R100 (220 m) on 16 Dec 1929
US Navy USS Akron	8 Aug 1931	180,000 m^{3} (6,400,000 cu ft)>	239 m	Largest helium-filled airship along with its USS Macon sister ship
LZ 129 Hindenburg	4 Apr 1936	200,000 m^{3}	245 m	Largest volume along with its LZ130 Graf Zeppelin II sister ship, approximately 237.2 tonnes with hydrogen fill

Hindenburg airship compared with the largest fixed-wing aircraft

=== Proposals ===
- Hydrogen carrier airship (2.45 km long) and balloon (727 m wide), 28,000-tonne MTOW both.
- Geostationary Banana Over Texas, a 300-meter-long (980 ft) helium-filled airship with an outer shell supposed to be made of paper and bamboo, shaped like a yellow banana.
- High Altitude Venus Operational Concept

== See also ==
- List of largest machines
- List of largest passenger vehicles
- Wide-body aircraft
