= Liberty Lifter =

U.S. military project developing a ground-effect seaplane

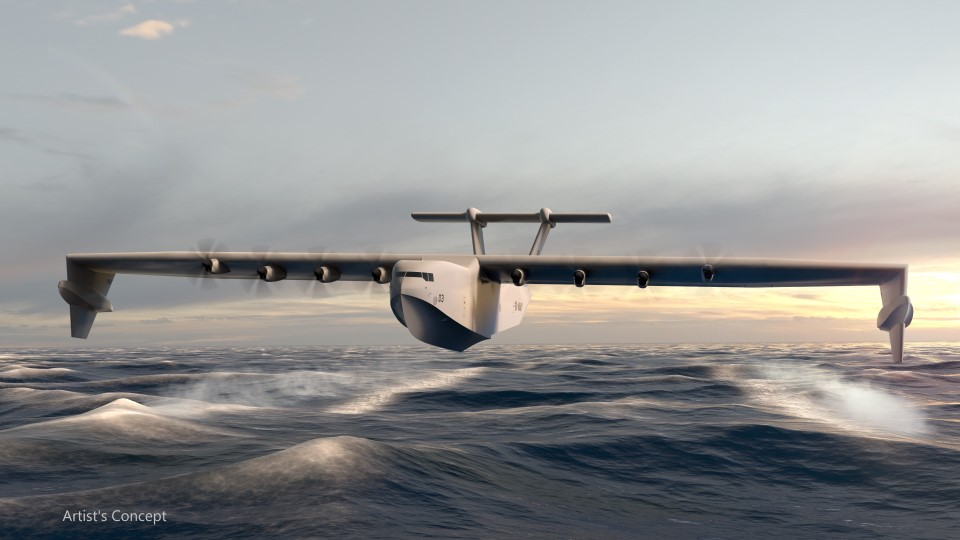

General information
- Type: Ground-effect Seaplane
- Manufacturer: Aurora Flight Sciences
- Status: Will be active

The Liberty Lifter was a U.S. military Defense Advanced Research Projects Agency (DARPA) project, launched in mid-2022, to develop a low-cost seaplane that uses the ground effect to travel long distances.

Like the Soviet-era ekranoplan design the A-90 Orlyonok, the Liberty Lifter aircraft was expected to operate in moderate to rough sea states, and be able to fly out of ground effect.

== History ==
DARPA launched the project in mid-2022, wanting a plane that could lift large, heavy loads by skimming the water in ground effect, and capable of operating at mid-altitudes of up to 10,000 feet (3,000 m). Using the ground effect, flying at an altitude equal to 5% of the wingspan can deliver 2.3 times more efficient flight performance. Such a vehicle would be able to land and take off from the water, making it runway-independent.

In February 2023, DARPA awarded contracts to two contractors to develop their own plans. One was General Atomics Aeronautical Systems (GA-ASI), partnering with Maritime Applied Physics Corporation. Their design featured a twin hull and a mid-wing, powered by twelve turboshaft engines. The other participant was Boeing subsidiary Aurora Flight Sciences, partnering with Leidos subsidiary Gibbs & Cox and with Oregon shipyard ReconCraft. Their design was a monohull with a high-wing, primarily relying on eight turbine engines; this was similar to Boeing prior Pelican proposal for the military.

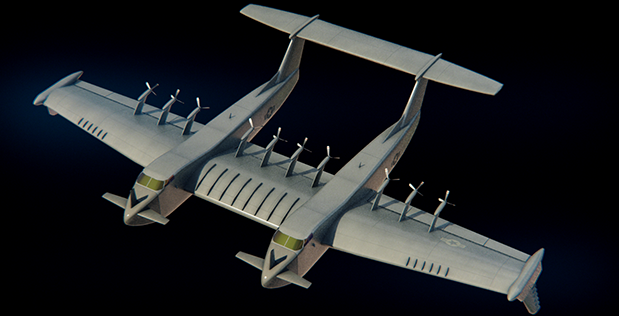
A rendering of a General Atomics' twin-fuselage aircraft Liberty Lifter proposal

The initial Phase 1 GA-ASI group contract was for about $8 million six months, with an option for another 12 months, potentially growing to a total of $29 million. The Aurora contract was for about $5.6 million.

In July 2023, DARPA exercised options on both teams’ initial proposals, and awarded GA-ASI an additional $21.5 million, and Aurora about $19.5 million, to fund continued development efforts.

Specifications for the craft included the ability to fly less than 100 feet (30 m) from sea level to harness ground effect, and the ability to climb as high as 10,000 feet (3,000 m) above mean sea level. It should have a ferry range of 6,500 nautical miles (12,000 km), and be able to take off and land in Sea State 4, but sustain on-water operations up to Sea State 5, while meeting the United States Department of Defense heavy lift requirements of carrying 90 tons and having a low-cost design and construction philosophy.

Such a craft would be similar in size and capacity to the Boeing C-17 Globemaster III and be able to carry a load equivalent to two U.S. Marine Corps Amphibious Combat Vehicles, or six 20-foot storage containers. Final designs for Phase 1 were expected by mid-2024. The winning proposal would proceed to Phase 2, which includes further design work, and the building and testing of a full-size prototype. It would then continue to flight-testing within roughly five years.

In May 2024, DARPA selected Aurora's design to continue development with an $8.3 million contract modification. DARPA said they expect a flying prototype to be fielded by late 2027 or early 2028. Aurora's design uses a traditional flying boat airframe, with a single hull and high wings that angle down at the ends, with floats on the wingtips, and a forked tail to accommodate an aft cargo door. The concept was scaled down to a C-130 Hercules-sized demonstrator with a wingspan of 213 ft (65 m) and capable of lifting 50,000 lb (22,680 kg) of cargo. If successful, it will be scaled up to the size of a C-17 with a cargo capacity of 180,000 lb (81,000 kg).

In July 2025, DARPA concluded the program would be successful and has transferred its results to industry stakeholders for further development.

"In June 2025, DARPA completed its work on Liberty Lifter. After restructuring the program to focus on areas of highest technical risk, the program’s simulation success and materials testing proved the viability of the Liberty Lifter concept. Instead of building a demonstrator aircraft, DARPA is working with industry and DOD stakeholders to accelerate transition of what we’ve learned to encourage rapid fielding of platforms leveraging the technologies developed at DARPA."

== See also ==
- Boeing Pelican
- Beriev Be-2500
- Lun-class ekranoplan
- Spasatel
- TTS-IS
