= Boeing RC-1 =

Cargo aircraft design

RC-1 "Brute Lifter"
- Artist's impression of the RC-1 cargo aircraft over northern Canada. The pods on the wings are almost the size of a 747SP.

General information
- Type: Cargo aircraft
- Manufacturer: Boeing
- Designer: Marvin Taylor
- Status: Design only

The Boeing RC-1, short for "Resource Carrier 1", was a design for an enormous cargo aircraft intended to haul oil and minerals out of the northern reaches of Alaska and Canada where ice-free ports were not available. It was optimized for short-haul missions only, carrying cargo to locations for loading onto ships, trains or pipelines. Depending on the role, the design was nicknamed "Brute Lifter" or "Flying Pipeline".

The basic design had a rectangular wing spanning almost 500 feet (150 meters), was powered by 12 Pratt & Whitney JT9D engines, and had 56 wheels in the main landing gear. A total of 2.3 million pounds (1,200 short tons; 1,000 metric tons) of cargo was carried in two under-wing pods and fuselage. The RC-1 would have been roughly twice the size and mass of the Antonov An-225 Mriya, the largest aircraft built, but would have carried about five times the payload. (Note: The maximum takeoff weight of the Mriya is about 1,400,000 lb (640,000 kg); the RC-1 was 3,550,000 lb (1,610,000 kg) MTOW, and carried 2,300,000 lb (1,000,000 kg) of cargo. For details of the underlying physics, see square–cube law.)

The RC-1 was designed in the early 1970s. The rapid increase in jet fuel prices beginning with the 1973 oil crisis caused the project to become uneconomical.

== History ==
=== Early concepts ===
The RC-1 concept traces its history to an informal question asked of Boeing engineer Marvin Taylor. A friend who worked in the oil exploration business asked Taylor about the possibility of airlifting crude oil out of the newly discovered Alaska North Slope fields to refineries in the south. Taylor's back-of-the-envelope calculations demonstrated such a system would cost many times the market price of the oil.

A series of injunctions against the Trans-Alaska Pipeline System imposed in April 1970 created the possibility that the oil from these fields would be stranded. Among a variety of potential solutions being offered, Boeing started a much more serious evaluation of the airlift concept. It was noticed early on that two important factors had not been fully considered earlier.

One was that an aircraft flying from Alaska to California would be flying right over some of the best developed shipping lanes available. By offloading as early as possible to some other mode of transport—tankers or pipelines—the amount of fuel burned would be greatly reduced. More importantly, this freed the aircraft to return to for another load more rapidly than if it flew all the way to California, meaning that a single aircraft could deliver more cargo in a given time. This had been noticed in the earlier studies, but the full impact had not been appreciated.

This led naturally to the second issue, involving the sortie rate of the aircraft. In the initial calculations they had assumed similar sortie rates as commercial aircraft like the Boeing 747, flying long multi-hour flights from the oil fields in Alaska to California. However, the sortie rates of commercial aircraft are based on customer preferences on what times they want to fly, not the actual ability of the aircraft. Assuming much shorter routes and 24-hour operation, sortie rates on the order of 18 to 20 flights a day seemed possible. This greatly reduced the number of aircraft that were needed to provide any particular level of service.

With these two concepts, it appeared that existing cargo conversions of aircraft like the 747 would result in airlift prices just below the then-current price of crude. This was not particularly practical, but given the great improvements over initial concepts, further studies followed. The first of these considered adaptations of the existing 747F freighters, removing the jet fuel from the wings due to the short range (relying instead on tanks in the fuselage and tail). With the load on the wings reduced, cargo could be carried along the spans or in the wing tanks. With these changes, in mid-summer 1970 Boeing presented a plan that could deliver oil for $1.50 to $2.00 a barrel. (Note: equivalent to $13 in 2025) The oil companies were not interested. At the time, a barrel sold for about $3 (Note: equivalent to $19 in 2025).

=== Great Plains ===
In 1970 Canadian Prime Minister Pierre Trudeau started the Great Plains Project to study economic development of the Canadian West and Canadian North. The Project was tasked with considering only "big picture" developments, ones that were just within the capabilities of existing technology.

As part of this project, the known mineral and potential oil and gas deposits in the Canadian Arctic Archipelago were considered for development. Shipping the products proved to be an enormous problem; the sea lanes were ice-free for only a few months a year, and building a railhead to even the closest suitable shore point would still require hundreds of miles of rail to be laid over tundra. (Note: See Salekhard–Igarka Railway for an incomplete Soviet example that was quickly rendered useless due to heaving.) A pipeline would have to cross both land and water, and was likewise considered extremely difficult to build.

The Project team became aware of Boeing's work with the 747F, and contacted them about the possibility of using the same basic system to haul ore instead of oil. This provided the impetus to develop the ultimate RC-1 concept. To carry ore, which couldn't simply be pumped into tanks in the aircraft, the team started considering using drop-off pods that would be loaded "offline" at the sides of the airports. The pods would then be hauled to the aircraft for flight to a railhead. There, they would be dropped off and emptied onto trains while the aircraft flew the return flight, taking a set of now-emptied pods from a previous aircraft with it. As they explored the concept, it became clear that the offline loading greatly improved turnaround times for any cargo, including oil. Further, custom pods allowed them to ship any sort of cargo on the same aircraft.

This led to the question as to where these pods should be located. An obvious solution would be to load them into the aircraft's huge fuselage. However, this would require the nose or tail to open, adding some complexity. It was noticed early on that it could be loaded much faster if the cargo was placed under the wings instead; the cargo containers could be driven up to either side of the aircraft at the same time. As soon as this was considered another major advantage became clear; by locating the pods closer to the landing gear, the total amount of cargo that could be carried was dramatically increased. This allowed the gear to be placed on the wings as on traditional designs, instead of the complex fuselage-mounted systems normally found on heavy lifters. This led to a further modification by placing two sets of gear on either side of each cargo pod, for a total of eight sets of main landing gear, further spreading out the loads.

Using this many landing gear on a swept wing would produce considerable problems when the aircraft tried to turn on the ground. It was possible to use steerable landing gear legs for this, but only at the cost of added complexity. An easier solution was to simply use a straight wing so the landing gear were in a line. However, this would limit the design to slower speeds below about Mach 0.7 (at which point wave drag becomes increasingly severe). This was perfectly acceptable for a short-haul role, where the cruise times were so short that added speed would have little actual effect on round-trip times. By limiting themselves to speeds not much greater than propeller transports, the engineers were free to select a wing designed solely for low-speed, high-lift performance. The result looked much more like the wing from a 1930s airliner than a modern jet aircraft.

A final consideration, especially for the Great Plains Project, was the use of methane for fuel instead of jet fuel. Due to aerodynamic control considerations, the fuselage of the RC-1 had to be very large, yet carried almost nothing. This left enormous room for fuel tankage, and the use of methane, hydrogen, or other lightweight fuels was a natural consideration. As the Canadian group was also interested in using the RC-1 to haul liquified natural gas, using this as the fuel for the aircraft (natural gas is mostly methane) was an obvious choice. Methane burns much cleaner than jet fuel, and would greatly extend the engine life while also reducing the need for maintenance. It would also eliminate the need to fly fuel to the northern sites; they could simply generate their fuel in-place.

In order to match the capacity and economics of a 48-inch (1 m) oil pipeline, the same being considered for the Alaska Pipeline and Mackenzie Valley Pipeline, the system required 50 aircraft (about 15 of those being spares) each carrying about 8,000 barrels of oil and flying 24 hours a day. The aircraft were estimated to cost $72 million each, (Note: equivalent to $420 million in 2025) and fly for between 1 and 1.5 cents/ton-mile (Note: equivalent to $0.09 in 2025)

The Project was delighted by the RC-1 proposal, and several well-publicized stories about it followed. They were particularly interested in the way that it allowed them to have market flexibility; the RC-1 could reach pipelines in Cochrane, Ontario, any one of the existing pipe heads in Alberta, or any point between. If market demands changed, they could simply ship the gas to a different location, thereby avoiding the cycling of prices seen between the various points on the pipeline network.

The Project also studied tankers and freighters able to drive the Arctic Ocean and Hudson Bay routes year-round, and a new northern deepwater port to support these ships, referred to as "Northport". This led to considerable concern in the town of Churchill, Manitoba, at that time the only major port on Hudson's Bay. Churchill was connected south by the Hudson Bay Railway, but its port was too shallow to handle the deep-hulled icebreakers being considered. Northport, considered at either Chesterfield Inlet or even Repulse Bay, would have connected to Churchill via a new rail line, but it would also replace Churchill as a useful commercial port. The RC-1 would have eased these concerns; building an airport at Churchill was far less expensive than a new port and railway to connect it.

The Project also considered unrelated projects, including huge fish farms in the prairies fed from enormous underground warm-water aquifers, and year-round "vegetable factories" in the Arctic.

=== End of the design ===
With these changes in place, Boeing was once again ready to present the new RC-1 design to the developers of the Prudhoe Bay oil fields. By this time several successful attempts had been made by the SS Manhattan to force transit of the Northwest Passage in 1969 and 1970, but the "icebreaker tanker" was considered too risky to consider for continuous operations. In 1972 Boeing was able to offer the RC-1 as a replacement, allowing trans-shipment to any suitable port, railhead or pipeline. In these latest studies, costs were between 86 cents and $1.02 per barrel (Note: equivalent to $6 in 2025).

By this point Boeing had invested about $500,000 of their own money (Note: equivalent to $3 million in 2025) in the RC-1 study series. With interest from both Canada and the US, the Great Plains Project was confident they would be able to gather a group of companies willing to fund the $15 million (Note: equivalent to $90 million in 2025) required for a full design study.

History, in the form of the 1973 oil crisis, ended these plans. The approximate doubling of jet fuel prices during the period from 1973 to 1974 rendered the RC-1 no longer competitive with a pipeline. No further work on the design appears to have been carried out. The Alaskan fields would ultimately be served by the Trans-Alaska Pipeline System.

== Design ==
The RC-1 was primarily intended for short-haul flights, between 500 and 1,000 miles (800–1,600 km), with rapid turnaround at the ends. This reduced the need for high cruising speeds.

The low-speed concept allowed the design to dispense with several features normally found on jet aircraft, notably the sweptback wing. By using a conventional rectangular wing, the wave drag produced at high speeds was greatly increased, but the low-speed lift was greatly increased as well. Further, the rectangular planform allowed the twin wing spars to be single pieces, and all of the engines, landing gear and cargo could be attached directly to the spar. By contrast, with a swept wing, this would place considerable torque loads on the point where the wings met the fuselage.

In most other aspects the design was relatively similar to other cargo aircraft of the era. The fuselage was large and roughly the size of a wide-body airliner (although relative to the length, it appeared to be a narrow-body design), with a T-tail at the end. The dozen engines were distributed evenly along the wings, with each side having four engines on the outer sections, and two between the cargo pods and fuselage.

To lower runway loads, the aircraft used a massive landing gear arrangement with 56 wheels. The majority of the wheels were located on eight legs with six wheels each, four to a side spread along the underside of the wings to distribute the loads. The nose gear used a single leg with eight wheels, itself the size of a 747's main gear. Fully deployed, the gear required a 400-foot-wide (120-meter) runway, but if the aircraft was unloaded, the outer gear could be raised to allow landings on existing commercial runways. This was useful for ferrying and service flights.

Cargo was carried in wing-mounted pods, each consisting of a cylinder 26 feet (8 m) in diameter and about the same length as a semi-trailer. This size was selected to allow them to carry standard 8 by 8 ft (2.4 by 2.4 m) cargo containers in a 2-by-2 arrangement, the same as the 747F. Each aircraft would carry four such pods, two on either side, one each in front and behind the two spars. The cylinders were mated to aerodynamic fairings while being prepared on the ground, depending on whether they were going to be on the front or rear of the wing. The wing itself had a "plug" section that locked on onto the pods. When combined on the wing the result was a single streamlined pod about 150 feet (45 m) long, about the same length as a 707. The pods could carry approximately 2,000 barrels of oil or 500,000 lb (230,000 kg) of other cargo.

Loading the pods was accomplished on a set of parallel railway tracks, two tracks on either side of the aircraft. The front and back halves of the pods were positioned at the end of the tracks on loaders, with the pods below the line of the wings. The aircraft would taxi into position between the rails, and the loaders would then raise the pods into position for locking onto the spars. They would then drive towards the aircraft for mating.

To achieve the required sortie rate needed to make the "flying pipeline" concept work, Boeing designed an airport around the aircraft. This featured three parallel runways that would operate at the same time. Aircraft landed on the two outer runways, and then taxied along large operational aprons at either end of the runways. Here they dropped their cargo pods and picked up empty ones for the return flight. Two such transfer stations were located at either end, in order to maintain the required sortie rate.

The aircraft weight was so reduced after unloading that a downwind takeoff was trivially accomplished, saving the time and fuel needed to taxi to the upwind end of the middle runway. In cases of very high winds, the center runway would be used as a taxiway to return the aircraft to the ends of the two outer runways for takeoff. This would reduce sortie rates. Likewise, at the loading end of the route, the aircraft would land downwind, load, and takeoff upwind.

Empty weight was 985,000 lb (447,000 kg), almost twice that of the Antonov An-225, the largest and heaviest aircraft to be built, at 285,000 kg (628,000 lb).

== Specifications ==
Data from Taylor, 1973

General characteristics

- Crew: 3
- Length: 338 ft (103 m)
- Wingspan: 478 ft (146 m)
- Height: 86 ft (26 m)
- Wing area: 32,560 sq ft (3,025 m^{2})
- Empty weight: 985,000 lb (446,788 kg)
- Max takeoff weight: 3,550,000 lb (1,610,253 kg)
- Cargo bay, four 26-foot diameter cylinders, 40+ feet long, designed to hold four standard cargo containers each
- Powerplant: 12 × Pratt & Whitney JT9D turbofans, 45,000 lbf (200 kN) thrust each

Performance

- Cruise speed: 460 mph (740 km/h, 400 kn)
- Range: 1,000 mi (1,600 km, 870 nmi) Range is quoted with full load of cargo

== See also ==
- TTS-IS – Russian future very large wing-in-ground-effect, lifting-body cargo aircraft
- Beriev Be-2500 – Russian super heavy amphibious transport aircraft currently in design and development
