= Flying banana =

The nickname "flying banana" or Flying Banana may be applied to:

Trains on British railways

- GWR diesel railcar – introduced in 1932
- InterCity 125 – referring to the original livery of the British Rail High Speed Train
- New Measurement Train – used by Network Rail to check track and signalling equipment

Other uses

- DFW B.I — Imperial German unarmed two-seat observation biplane with "banana-planform" wings (1914)
- Piasecki H-21 – a military helicopter
- Handley Page H.P.42 - a British biplane airliner
- HRP Rescuer – an American tandem-rotor helicopter
- Geostationary Banana Over Texas – a proposed work of art that received funding from the Canadian government but was never created
- Southern yellow-billed hornbill – a hornbill found in southern Africa
- The airplanes of Hughes Air West were known as "flying bananas" due to their distinctive banana-yellow fuselage and tail colors.
