= Conventional landing gear =

Aircraft undercarriage

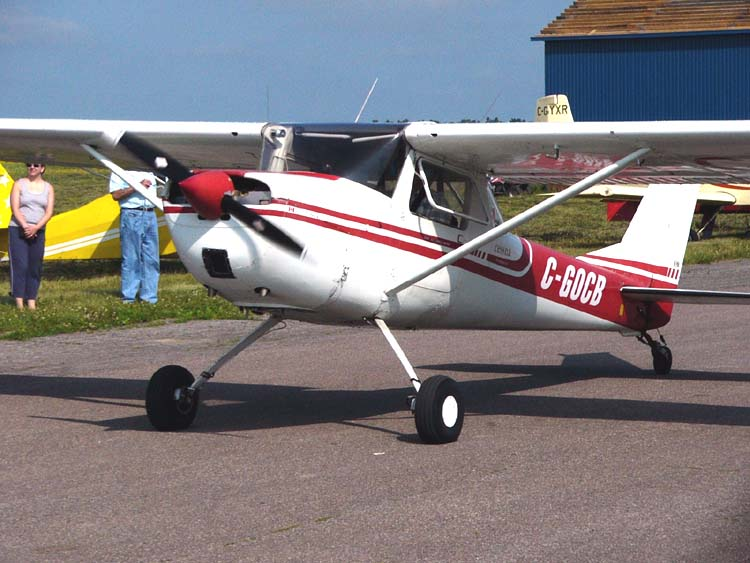
A Cessna 150 converted to taildragger configuration by installation of an aftermarket modification kit

Conventional landing gear, also known as tailwheel-type landing gear or taildragger, is a type of aircraft undercarriage (landing gear) consisting of two wheeled main gears forward of the center of gravity and a small wheel or skid at the rear end under the tail boom.

Taildraggers are the default undercarriage arrangements of almost all early aircraft up to the first half of the 20th century and the term "conventional" persists for this historical reason, but all modern jet aircraft and most modern propeller fixed-wing aircraft use tricycle landing gear instead, which comprises a single front wheel (nose gear) and two aft main wheels.

== History ==
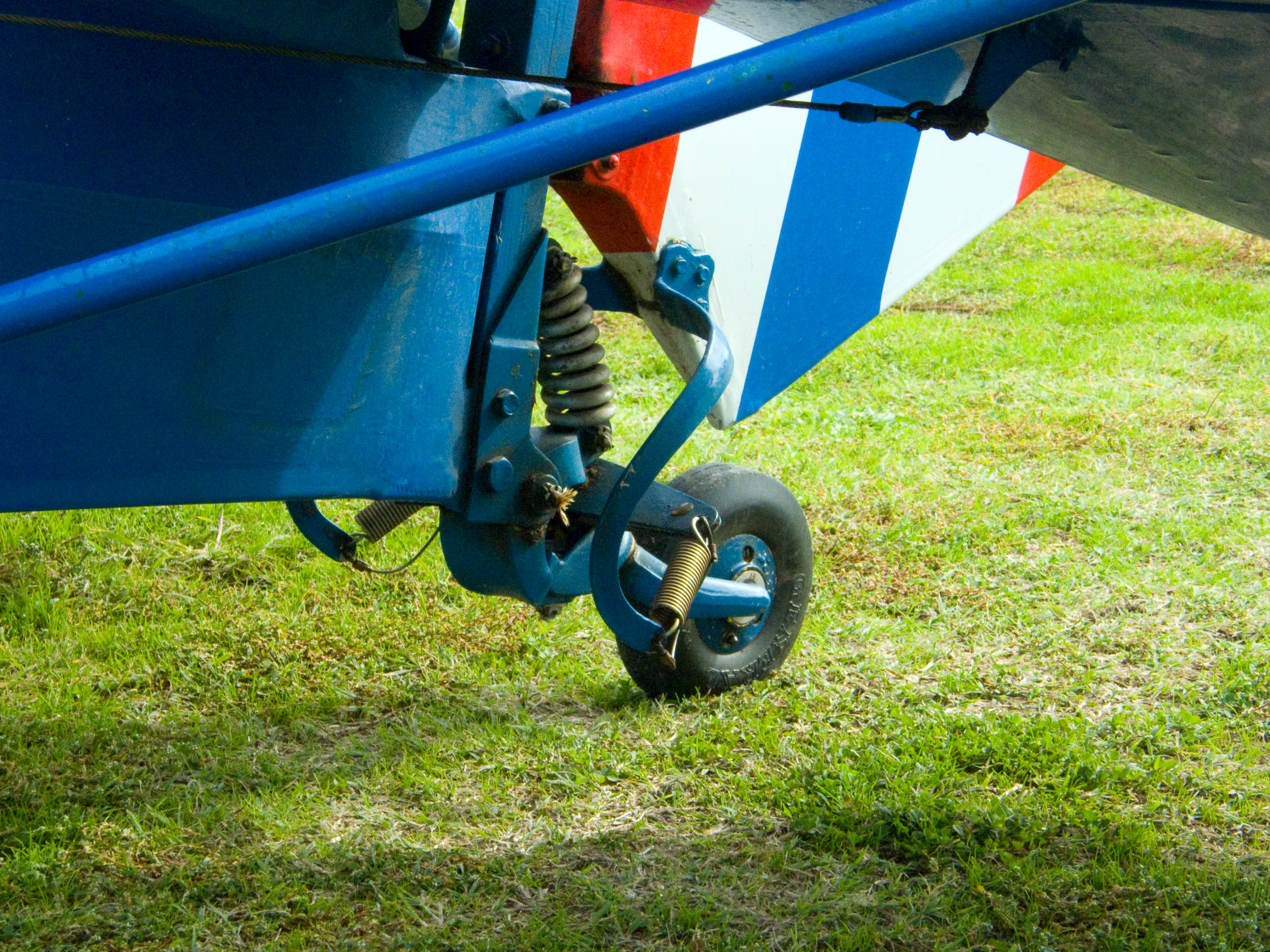
Tailwheel detail on a Tiger Moth biplane

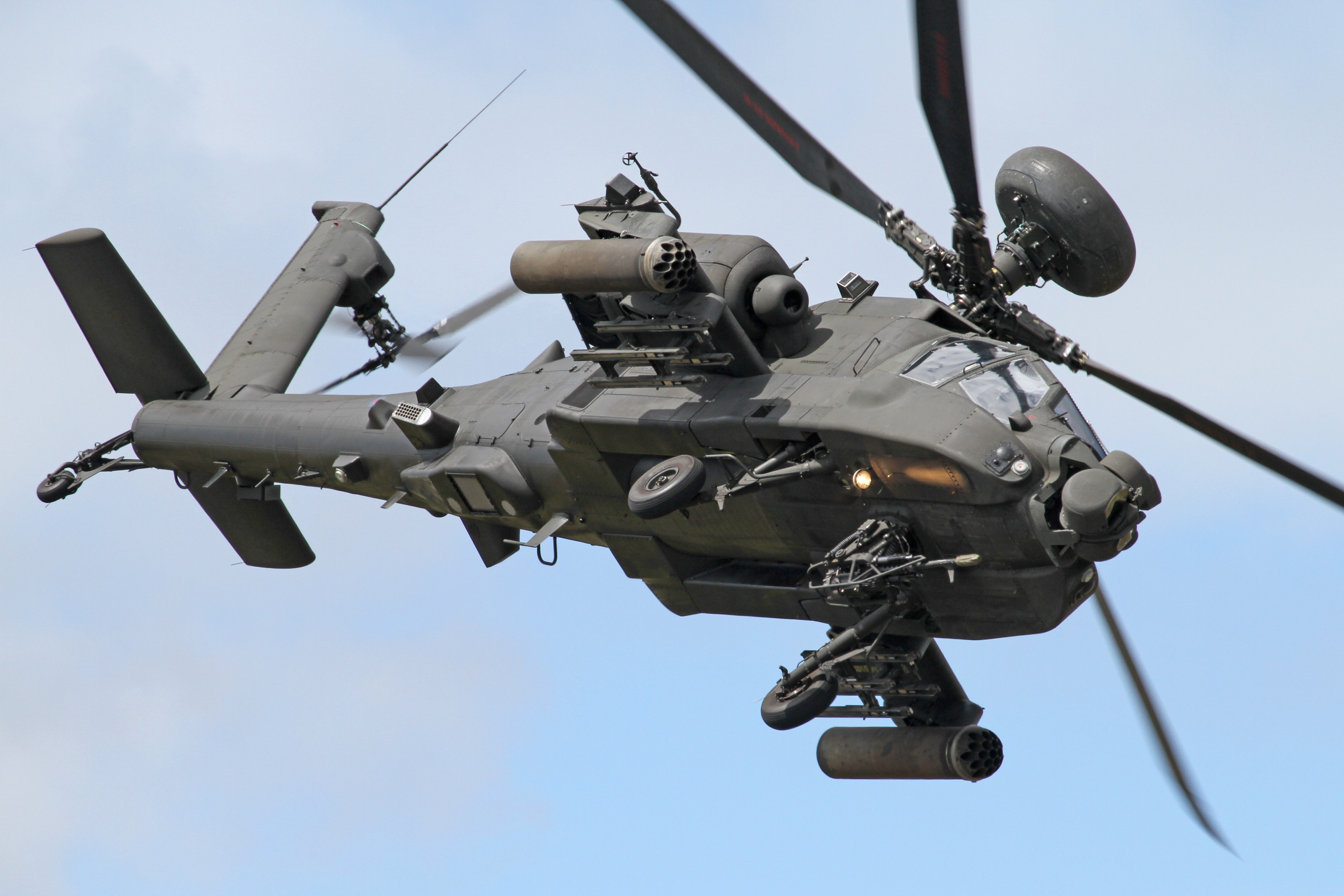
Like many attack helicopters, the AgustaWestland Apache has a tailwheel to allow an unobstructed arc of fire for the gun.

In early aircraft, a tailskid made of metal or wood was used to support the tail on the ground. In most modern aircraft with conventional landing gear, a small articulated wheel assembly is attached to the rearmost part of the airframe in place of the skid. This wheel may be steered by the pilot through a connection to the rudder pedals, allowing the rudder and tailwheel to move together.

Before aircraft commonly used tailwheels, many aircraft (like a number of First World War Sopwith aircraft, such as the Camel fighter) were equipped with steerable tailskids, which operate similarly to a tailwheel. When the pilot pressed the right rudder pedal—or the right footrest of a "rudder bar" in World War I—the skid pivoted to the right, creating more drag on that side of the plane and causing it to turn to the right. While less effective than a steerable wheel, it gave the pilot some control of the direction the craft was moving while taxiing or beginning the takeoff run, before there was enough airflow over the rudder for it to become effective.

Another form of control, which is less common now than it once was, is to steer using "differential braking", in which the tailwheel is a simple, freely castering mechanism, and the aircraft is steered by applying brakes to one of the mainwheels to turn in that direction. This is also used on some tricycle gear aircraft, with the nosewheel being the freely castering wheel instead. Like the steerable tailwheel/skid, it is usually integrated with the rudder pedals on the craft to allow an easy transition between wheeled and aerodynamic control.

== Advantages ==
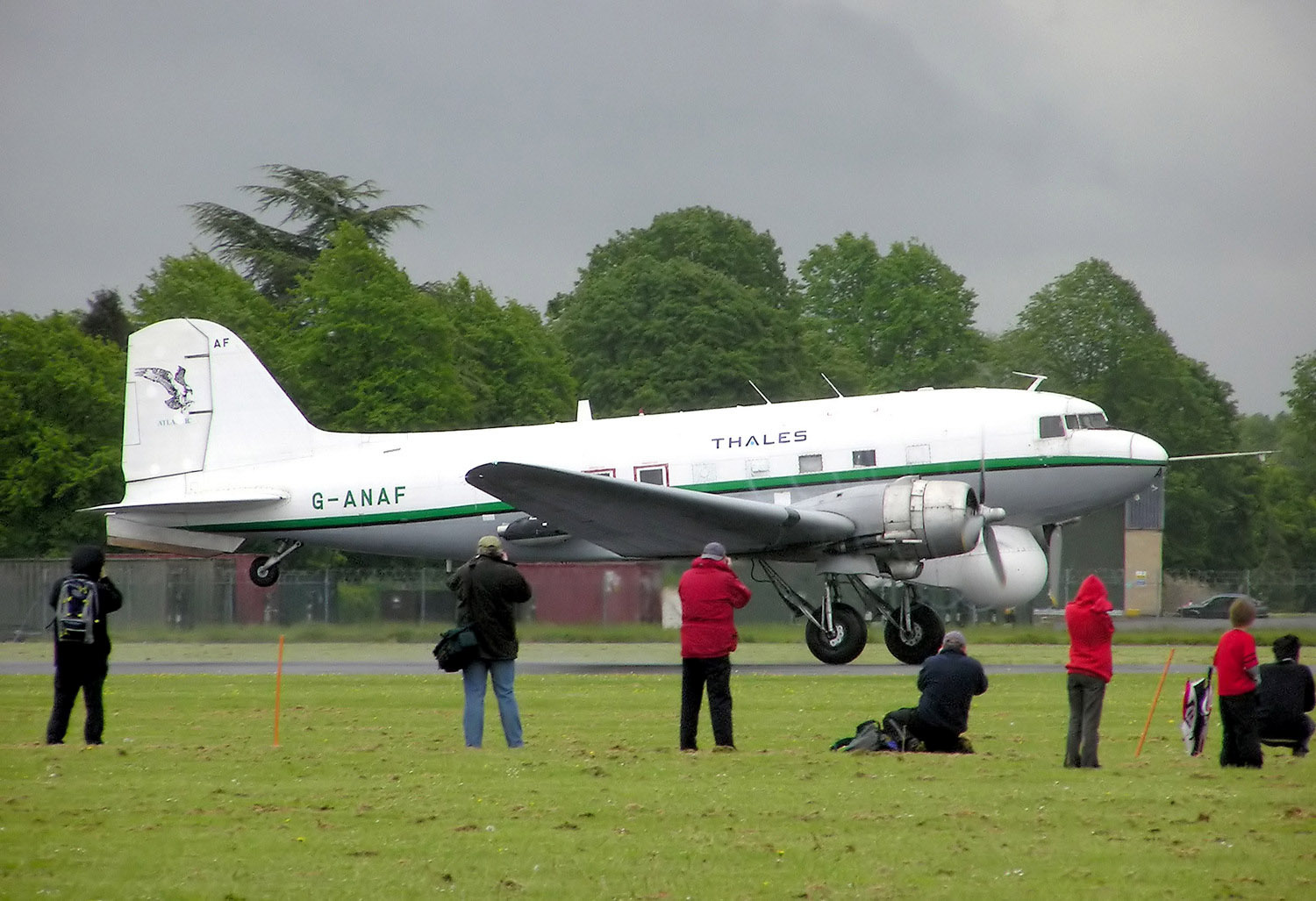
Douglas DC-3, a taildragger airliner

The tailwheel configuration offers several advantages over the tricycle landing gear arrangement, which make tailwheel aircraft less expensive to manufacture and maintain.

- Due to its position much further from the center of gravity, a tailwheel supports a smaller part of the aircraft's weight allowing it to be made much smaller and lighter than a nosewheel. As a result, the smaller wheel weighs less and causes less parasitic drag.
- Because of the way airframe loads are distributed while operating on rough ground, tailwheel aircraft are better able to sustain this type of use over a long period of time, without cumulative airframe damage occurring.
- If a tailwheel fails on landing, the damage to the aircraft will be minimal. This is not the case in the event of a nosewheel failure, which usually results in a prop strike.
- Due to the increased propeller clearance on tailwheel aircraft, less stone chip damage will result from operating a conventionally geared aircraft on rough or gravel airstrips, making them well suited to bush flying.
- Tailwheel aircraft are more suitable for operation on skis.
- Tailwheel aircraft are easier to fit into and manoeuvre inside some hangars.

== Disadvantages ==
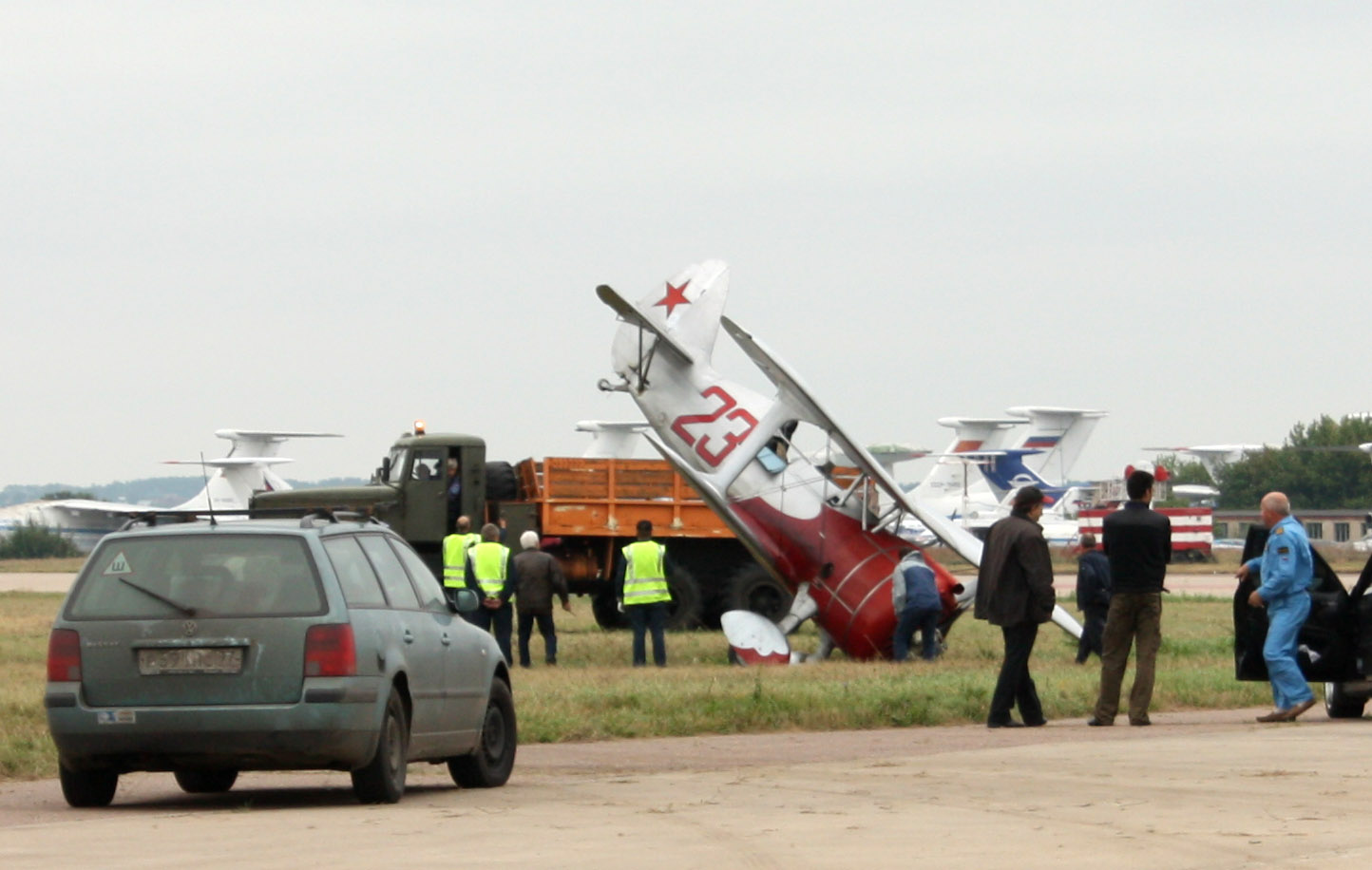
A nose-over accident with Polikarpov I-15 bis

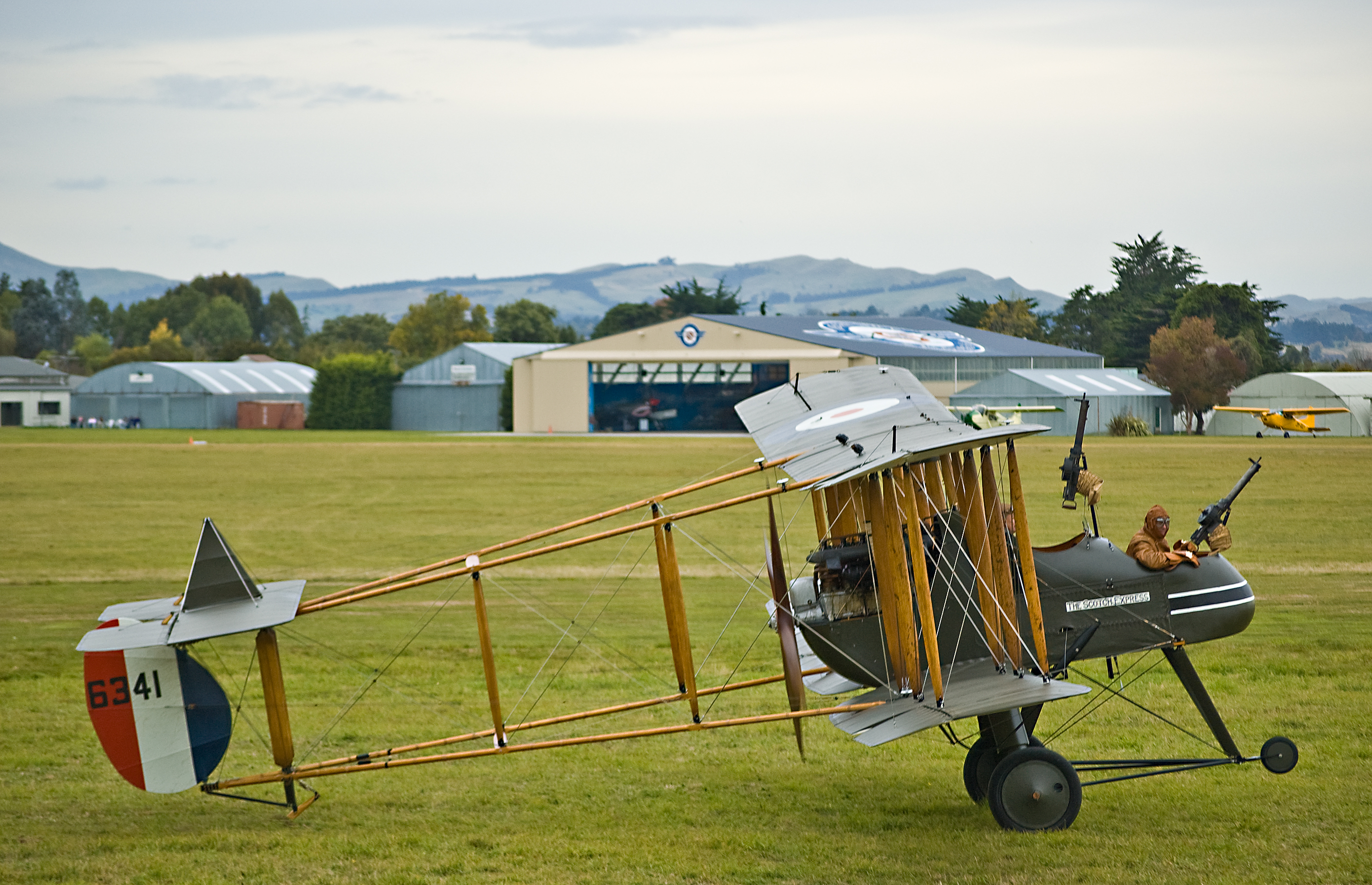
A replica World War 1 F.E.2 fighter. This aircraft uses a tailskid. The small wheel at the front is a safety device intended to prevent nose-over accidents.

The conventional landing gear arrangement has disadvantages compared to nosewheel aircraft.

- Tailwheel aircraft are more subject to "nose-over" accidents due to incorrect application of brakes by the pilot.
- Conventional geared aircraft are much more susceptible to ground looping. A ground loop occurs when directional control is lost on the ground and the tail of the aircraft passes the nose, swapping ends, in some cases completing a full circle. This event can result in damage to the aircraft's undercarriage, tires, wingtips, propeller and engine. Ground-looping occurs because whereas a nosewheel aircraft is steered from ahead of the center of gravity, a taildragger is steered from behind (much like driving a car backward at high speed), so that on the ground a taildragger is inherently unstable, whereas a nosewheel aircraft will self-center if it swerves on landing. In addition, some tailwheel aircraft must transition from using the rudder to steer to using the tailwheel while passing through a speed range when neither is wholly effective due to the nose high angle of the aircraft and lack of airflow over the rudder. Avoiding ground loops requires more pilot training and skill.

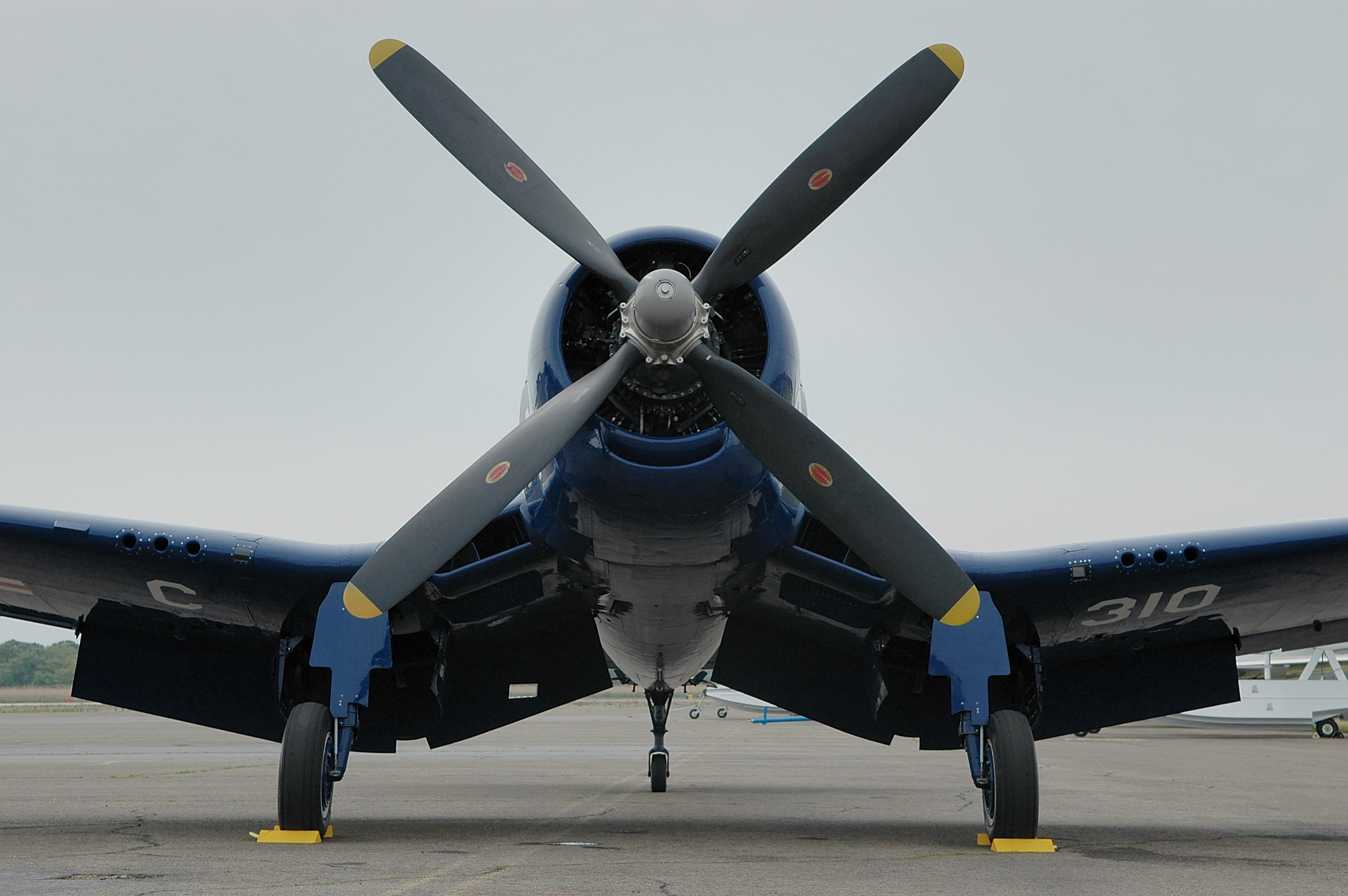
A parked Vought F4U Corsair. If this aircraft were taxiing, the pilot would be unable to see the photographer.

- Tailwheel aircraft generally suffer from poorer forward visibility on the ground, compared to nose wheel aircraft. Often this requires continuous "S" turns on the ground to allow the pilot to see where they are taxiing.
- Tailwheel aircraft are more difficult to taxi during high wind conditions, due to the higher angle of attack on the wings which can then develop more lift on one side, making control difficult or impossible. They also suffer from lower crosswind capability and in some wind conditions may be unable to use crosswind runways or single-runway airports.
- Due to the nose-high attitude on the ground, propeller-powered taildraggers are more adversely affected by P-factor – asymmetrical thrust caused by the propeller's disk being angled to the direction of travel, which causes the blades to produce more lift when going down than when going up due to the difference in angle the blade experiences when passing through the air. The aircraft will then pull to the side of the upward blade. Some aircraft lack sufficient rudder authority in some flight regimes (particularly at higher power settings on takeoff) and the pilot must compensate before the aircraft starts to yaw. Some aircraft, particularly older, higher powered aircraft such as the P-51 Mustang, cannot use full power on takeoff and still safely control their direction of travel. On landing this is less of a factor, however opening the throttle to abort a landing can induce severe uncontrollable yaw unless the pilot is prepared for it.

== Jet-powered tailwheel aircraft ==
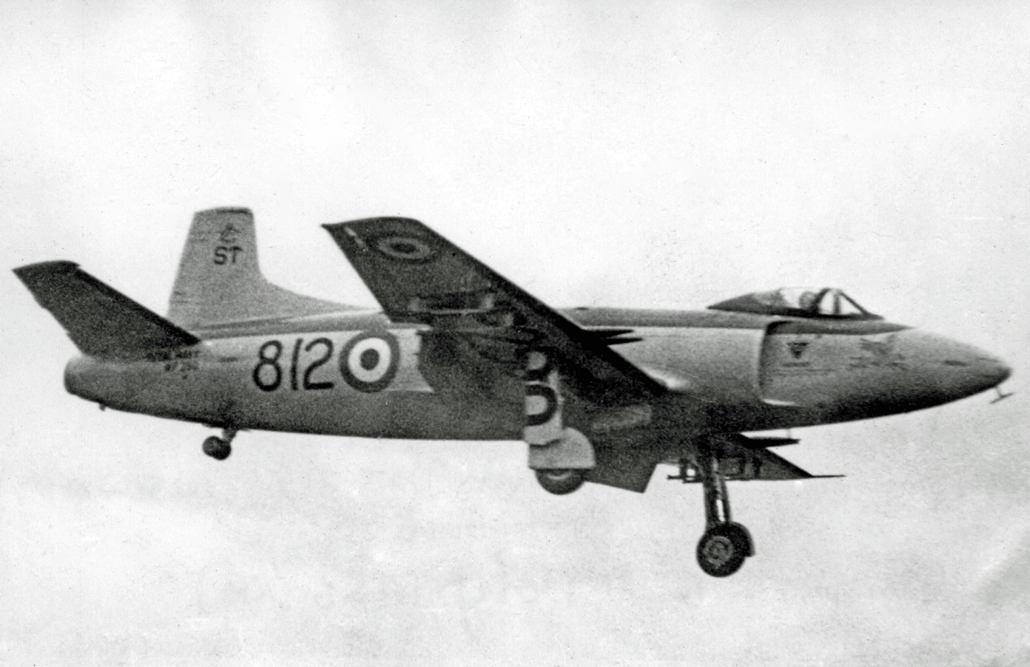
Royal Navy Supermarine Attacker landing at RNAS Stretton, England, 1956

Jet aircraft generally cannot use conventional landing gear, as this orients the engines at a high angle, causing their jet blast to bounce off the ground and back into the air, preventing the elevators from functioning properly. This problem occurred with the third, or "V3" prototype of the German Messerschmitt Me 262 jet fighter. After the first four prototype Me 262 V-series airframes were built with retracting tailwheel gear, the fifth prototype was fitted with fixed tricycle landing gear for trials, with the sixth prototype onwards getting fully retracting tricycle gear. A number of other experimental and prototype jet aircraft had conventional landing gear, including the first successful jet, the Heinkel He 178, the Ball-Bartoe Jetwing research aircraft, and a single Vickers VC.1 Viking, which was modified with Rolls-Royce Nene engines to become the world's first jet airliner.

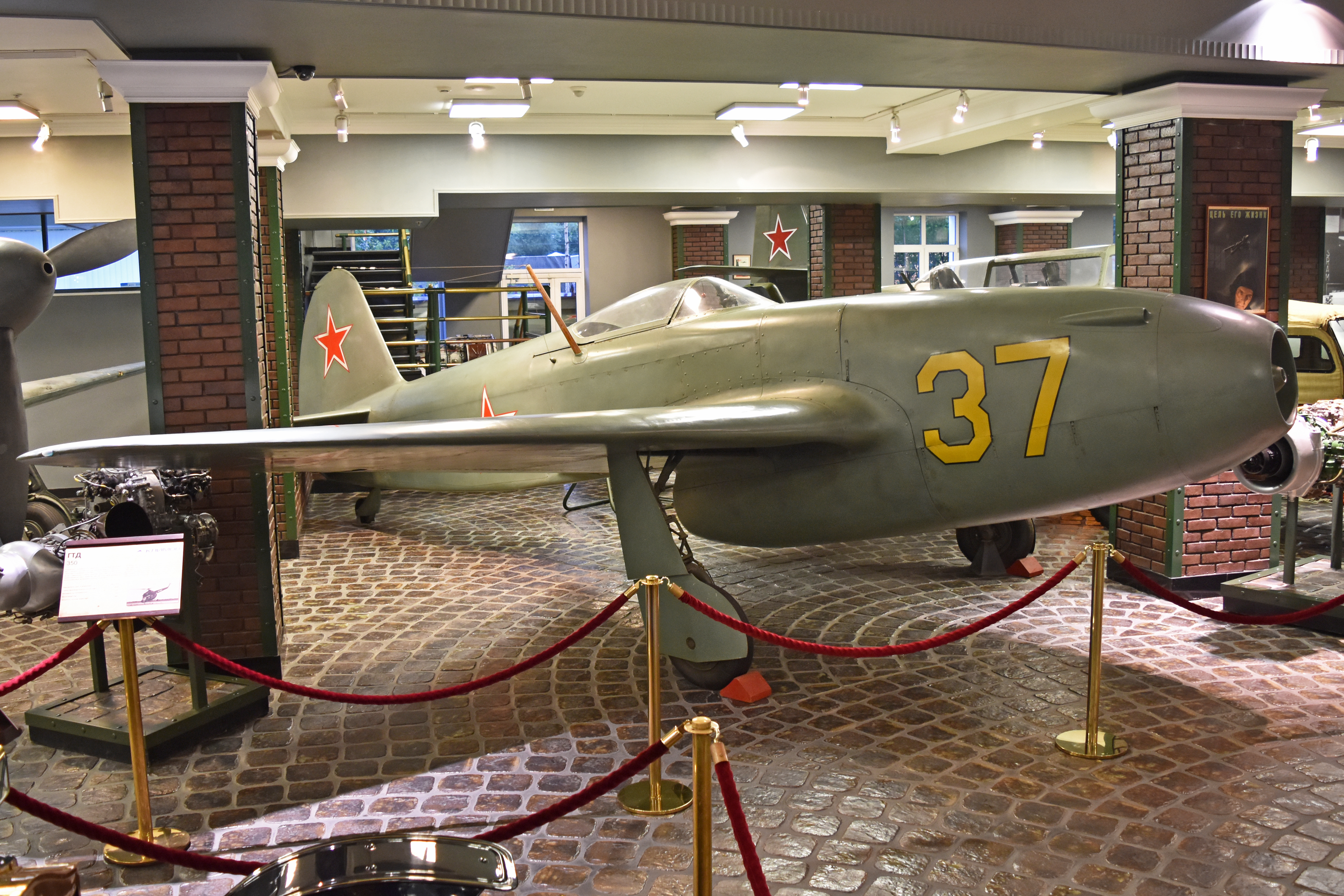
The sole surviving Yak-15. Vadim Zadorozhny Technical Museum, Moscow, 2012

Rare examples of jet-powered tailwheel aircraft that went into production and saw service include the British Supermarine Attacker naval fighter and the Soviet Yakovlev Yak-15. Both first flew in 1946 and owed their configurations to being developments of earlier propeller powered aircraft. The Attacker's tailwheel configuration was a result of it using the Supermarine Spiteful's wing, avoiding expensive design modification or retooling. The engine exhaust was behind the elevator and tailwheel, reducing problems. The Yak-15 was based on the Yakovlev Yak-3 propeller fighter. Its engine was mounted under the forward fuselage. Despite its unusual configuration, the Yak-15 was easy to fly. Although a fighter, it was mainly used as a trainer aircraft to prepare Soviet pilots for flying more advanced jet fighters.

== Monowheel undercarriage ==
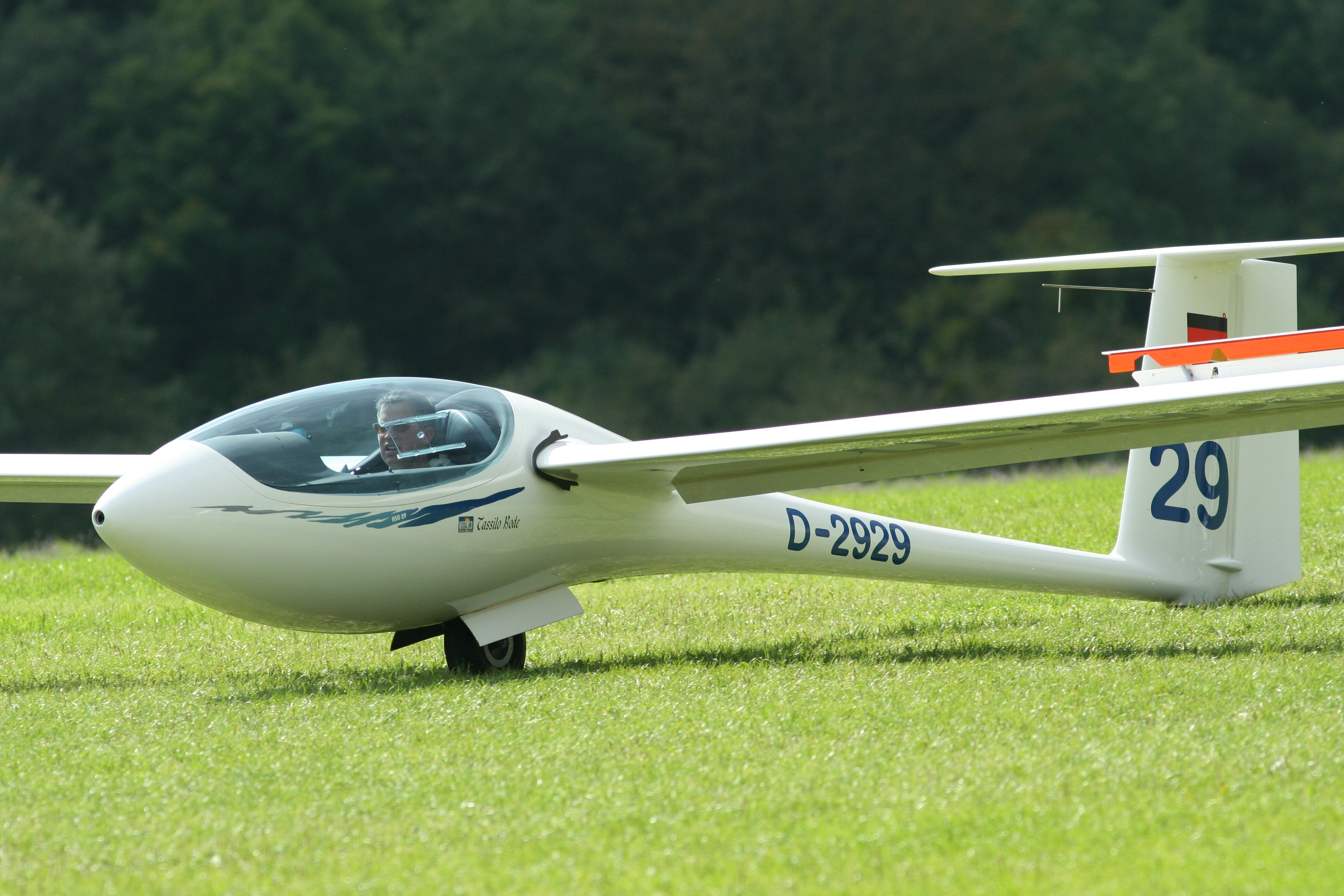
A Schleicher ASG 29 glider shows its monowheel landing gear

A variation of the taildragger layout is the monowheel landing gear.

To minimize drag, many modern gliders have a single wheel, retractable or fixed, centered under the fuselage, which is referred to as monowheel gear or monowheel landing gear. Monowheel gear is also used on some powered aircraft, where drag reduction is a priority, such as the Europa XS. Monowheel power aircraft use retractable wingtip legs (with small castor wheels attached) to prevent the wingtips from striking the ground. A monowheel aircraft may have a tailwheel (like the Europa) or a nosewheel (like the Schleicher ASK 23 glider).

== Training ==
Taildragger aircraft require more training time for student pilots to master. This was a large factor in the 1950s switch by most manufacturers to nosewheel-equipped trainers, and for many years nosewheel aircraft have been more popular than taildraggers. As a result, most Private Pilot Licence (PPL) pilots now learn to fly in tricycle gear aircraft (e.g. Cessna 172 or Piper Cherokee) and only later transition to taildraggers.

== Techniques ==
Landing a conventional geared aircraft can be accomplished in two ways.

Normal landings are done by touching all three wheels down at the same time in a three-point landing. This method does allow the shortest landing distance but can be difficult to carry out in crosswinds, as rudder control may be reduced severely before the tailwheel can become effective.

The alternative is the wheel landing. This requires the pilot to land the aircraft on the mainwheels while maintaining the tailwheel in the air with elevator to keep the angle of attack low. Once the aircraft has slowed to a speed that can ensure control will not be lost, but above the speed at which rudder effectiveness is lost, then the tailwheel is lowered to the ground.

== Examples ==
Examples of tailwheel aircraft include:

=== Airplanes ===
- de Havilland Canada DHC-2 Beaver
- Douglas DC-3
- Maule M-7
- Messerschmitt Bf 109
- Piper J-3 Cub
- Supermarine Spitfire

=== Helicopters ===
- Boeing AH-64 Apache – Attack helicopter
- Sikorsky SH-3 Sea King – Anti-submarine helicopter

== Modifications of tricycle gear aircraft ==
Several aftermarket modification companies offer kits to convert many popular nose-wheel equipped aircraft to conventional landing gear. Aircraft for which kits are available include:

- Cessna 150
- Cessna 152
- Cessna 172
- Cessna 175
- Cessna 182
- Piper PA-22 Tri-Pacer
