= Boeing Pelican =

Proposed ground effect fixed-wing aircraft under study

Pelican ULTRA
- Boeing image of the proposed Pelican

General information
- Type: Outsize cargo ground effect freight aircraft
- Manufacturer: Boeing Phantom Works
- Status: Concept only

The Boeing Pelican ULTRA (Ultra Large Transport Aircraft) was a proposed ground effect fixed-wing aircraft under study by Boeing Phantom Works in the early 2000s.

== Development ==
The Boeing Pelican ULTRA is intended as a large-capacity transport craft initially for military use, with possible subsequent availability as a commercial freighter serving the world's largest cargo centers. It is significantly larger and more capable than the biggest existing commercial airliners, commercial freighters, and military airlifters. The Pelican is not targeted for civilian transportation, but it can be converted to a commercial airliner transporting up to 3,000 passengers.

=== Internal deliberation ===
The design process for what became the Pelican began in early 2000, when designers in the Phantom Works division of Boeing started working on solutions for the United States Armed Forces objective of moving thousands of troops, weapons, military equipment, and provisions to a war or battle scene faster, such as successfully deploying an Army brigade of 3,000 troops and 8,000 short tons (7,300 t) of equipment within ninety-six hours (4 days) instead of the three to six months (91 to 183 days) it required in the past. In particular, the Department of Defense had requested a vehicle of any mode (land, air, or sea) with the ability to move 1,000,000 pounds (450 t) of cargo. Knowing that the United States Army was investigating large airships and airship-airplane hybrids, Boeing Phantom Works internally considered and rejected at least three known design iterations: a large blimp or dirigible airship, a smaller but wider airship that creates dynamic lift while in forward motion, and then back to a larger airship that flies at low altitude with wings spanning 700 ft (213 m). It also looked at and discarded a fast oceangoing ship and a sea-based ground effect vehicle.

A plan view of a ground effect concept airplane. Many features of this concept were incorporated into the Boeing Pelican ULTRA.

Boeing Phantom Works then selected a land-based ground effect vehicle with high drooping wings as its solution. It applied for a patent in October 2001 on a ground effect airplane that would form the basis for the Pelican, aside from some eventually omitted design elements such as a T-tail, upward-pointing (positive dihedral) winglets, an additional middle row of landing gears, and a loading ramp at the back of the fuselage. The patent also listed open-ended fuselage compartment dimensions of at least 16 ft (4.9 m) high, 24 ft (7.3 m) wide, and 100 ft (30 m) long, with an aircraft wingspan of at least 300 ft (91 m). Its example fuselage length and wingspan of 420 ft (128 m) and 480 ft (146 m) would come close to the final Pelican configuration, though.

Initial artist drawings of the aircraft were made public in early 2002. In May 2002, Boeing applied for a patent on variable-sweep, downward-pointing (negative dihedral, or anhedral) winglets to help ground effect vehicles avoid water contact while minimizing aerodynamic drag; the patent drawings show a cylindrical fuselage, which may indicate that a pressurized aircraft was considered at the time, although the final Pelican design has an unpressurized fuselage. The next month, without explicitly naming Boeing as the aircraft originator, the Army cited the Pelican as an emerging technology to improve strategic responsiveness in its 2002 Transformation Roadmap. In July, a U.S. Transportation Command team lead at Scott Air Force Base mentioned the Pelican as a practical solution for moving troops and equipment over long distances. Meanwhile, the designers evaluated three different aircraft sizes with mean takeoff weights of 3.5, 6.0, and 10.0 million pounds (1.6, 2.7, and 4.5 million kilograms; 1,800, 3,000, and 5,000 short tons; 1,600, 2,700, and 4,500 metric tons) and wingspans of 380, 500, and 620 ft (120, 150, and 190 m), respectively.

=== Public introduction ===
The Pelican was formally introduced to the public at the 2002 Farnborough International Airshow in July, but with few specifics. As described in its physical form, the aircraft mostly resembled future versions of the Pelican, except that the winglets were reverted to upward-pointing to maximize lift. Boeing announced that the Pelican could fly up to 2,000 to 3,000 ft (610 to 914 m) in altitude and that the wingspan was limited by a 262-foot width (80 m) so that it could be used on existing runways and taxiways. Both parameters were drastically smaller than the Pelican's eventual final specifications, however, and although Boeing's original patent called for a folding wing, news reports did not mention a folding mechanism, so it was unclear whether the stated wingspan represented an unfoldable, unfolded, or folded width. On the other hand, Boeing mentioned a theoretical Pelican payload of up to 6,000,000 lb (2,700,000 kg; 3,000 short tons; 2,700 t), which was much larger than the final specified maximum payload and was actually about equal to the final maximum takeoff weight. While Boeing said that the U.S. Army was evaluating the Pelican in war games as a solution to "beat ships across the ocean," and that the company was jointly studying the aircraft with the U.S. Defense Advanced Research Projects Agency (DARPA), it noted that full concept studies would not begin for another 5–8 years, and the aircraft would have to wait for at least 20 years before entering service.

In the September 2002 edition of its company news magazine, Boeing published an article highlighting the Pelican and revealing more of its final specifications, including a 500-foot wingspan (152 m), a wing area of over one acre (43,560 sq ft; 4,047 m^{2}), a payload of 1,400 short tons (1,270 t) of cargo, an increased flight service ceiling of 20,000 ft (6,100 m) or more in altitude, and a range for a smaller payload of 6,500 to 10,000 nautical miles (7,480 to 11,500 miles; 12,000 to 18,500 kilometres), depending on the flight mode. In addition, it stated that the Pelican could move 17 M-1 Abrams tanks, and that the aircraft would be offered along with the C-17 Globemaster III transport, the CH-47 Chinook helicopter, and the Advanced Theater Transport as part of the company's mobility solution for the U.S. armed forces. This article attracted international media coverage, and as Boeing Phantom Works continued to mature the design (including selection of the mid-size vehicle option), additional details about the aircraft began to appear over the next year in newspaper, general science magazine, and aviation industry print publications and research conferences. In November 2002, Boeing also applied for a patent on an automated system for controlling large, multiple-wheel steering aircraft (such as the Pelican) during ground maneuvers, crosswind landings, and crosswind takeoffs.

According to Boeing, the Pelican aircraft technology was starting to gain followers among the decision makers evaluating the mobility initiatives within the Army and the Air Force, and the Navy also showed interest though it was directing its attention more toward hybrid ultra-large airships (HULAs). The market could support over 1,000 of this type of aircraft by 2020, Boeing asserted, if the military used this aircraft and if air transport's share of the transoceanic cargo shipping market increased to two percent from one percent (versus the current 99 percent for ocean shipping transport). Taking some market share from ocean shipping could occur, contended Boeing, because in comparison with traditional air cargo transports, the Pelican is less expensive and offers much more payload volume and weight. Boeing stated that the Pelican's continued development could depend on a positive result in the U.S. Army's Advanced Mobility Concepts Study (AMCS), which would describe the future mobility concepts and capabilities needed by the armed forces in years 2015 to 2020.

By the latter half of 2003, Boeing Phantom Works was showcasing the Pelican on its web site and in technology expositions. The U.S. Army published the AMCS report in December 2003, but the Pelican was not among the list of the eight most promising future mobility platforms for evaluation. Despite this setback, Boeing in 2004 continued low-key educational and evangelical promotion of the aircraft. At the 2004 Farnborough Air Show, Boeing announced that the Pelican had entered wind tunnel testing and that the aircraft's service ceiling was increased to 25,000 ft (7,600 m).

=== Project stoppage ===
In a 2005 United States congressional report evaluating 11 proposed airlift and sealift platforms for military mobility, the Boeing Pelican was assessed as marginally feasible to enter service in 2016, ranking behind six platforms that were deemed feasible. The lower grade was due to the tremendous investment required to develop an operational product because of the scale of the aircraft and the use of high-risk technologies, which might prevent the aircraft from achieving technology readiness level (TRL) 5. With this assessment, the report essentially reaffirmed Boeing's previous concerns about its ability to produce the aircraft for service by a 2015 timeframe.

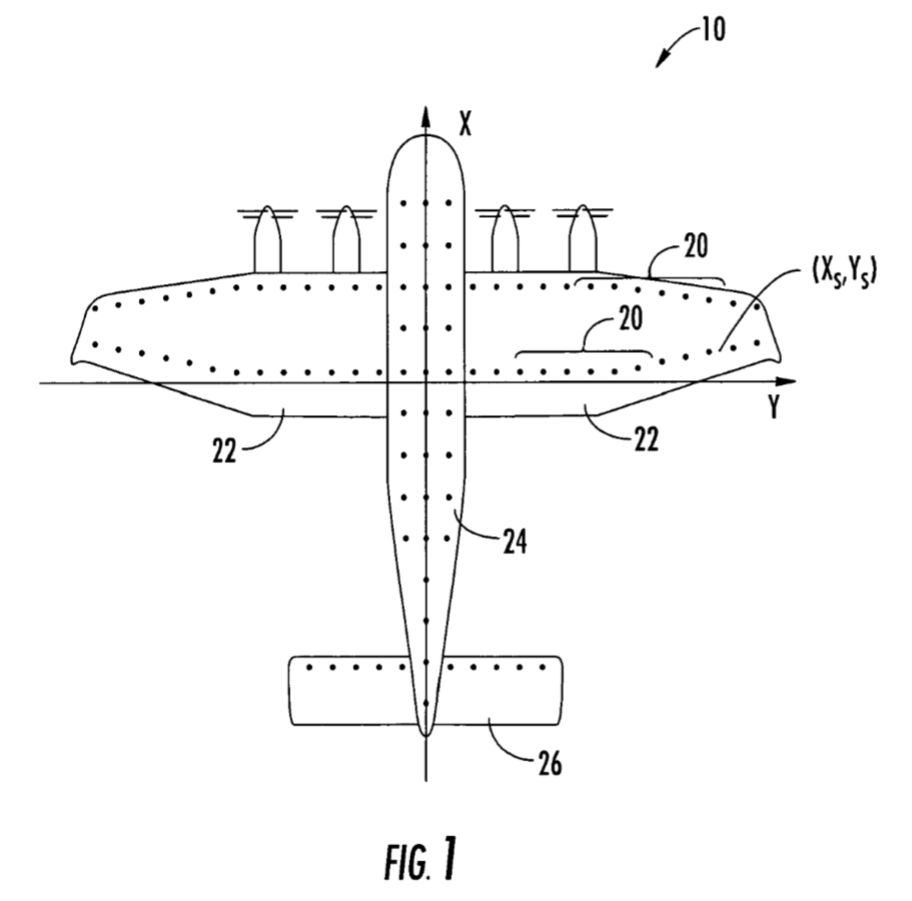
Altitude measurement sensors attached throughout the underside of the aircraft.

Though Boeing filed a couple of patent applications in mid-2005 relating to cargo container handling and automatic altitude measurement, no other public announcements appear to have been made about the aircraft after the report was issued. By April 2006, a report on Boeing internal documents showed that its long-term aircraft focus was primarily about low-cost and environmentally efficient passenger planes of conventional size, and there was no mention of the Boeing Pelican. Facing diminished odds of a large order from the U.S. armed forces, which collectively represented the aircraft's sole indispensable launch customer, Boeing quietly discontinued further development of the Pelican program.

== Design ==
Like the pelican water bird for which it is named, the concept aircraft can both skim over water and soar to heights above mountain peaks. However, the Pelican is not designed for contact with bodies of water, so although the aircraft cannot take off or land at sea, it can be designed to be lighter and more aerodynamic. The aircraft is a land-based ground effect vehicle that operates from conventional runways despite having an enormous maximum takeoff weight (MTOW) of 6 million pounds (2.7 million kilograms; 3,000 short tons; 2,700 metric tons). During flight, the Pelican exits ground effect to climb a few thousand feet while the surface below the aircraft changes from ocean to solid ground, then enters descent to arrive at an airport like other airplanes. This capability differentiates the aircraft from some previously built ground effect vehicles such as the Caspian Sea Monster, whose relatively narrow 120-foot wingspan (37 m) could not produce enough lift to fly the large vehicle out of ground effect.

=== Flight characteristics ===
In its most efficient flight mode, the Pelican flies in ground effect at 20 to 50 feet (6.1 to 15.2 metres) above the water, measured from the fixed structure (the underside of the fuselage), though the aircraft distance can be reduced to 10 to 40 ft (3.0 to 12.2 m) depending on its wingtip positioning. It has a cruise speed of 240 knots (276 miles per hour; 444 kilometres per hour), which lets it skim above 90 percent of the ocean about 90 percent of the time before high waves force it to fly out of ground effect. Boeing's ocean wave studies during 2000 revealed that north–south aircraft routes and many east–west routes worked very well in ground effect, with flights at latitude between 30 degrees north and 30 degrees south being very efficient, while polar routes were more challenging. The aircraft can also cruise over land at 400 kn (460 mph; 741 km/h) with an altitude of 20,000 ft (6,100 m). At higher flight levels, the aircraft can attain nearly jet-like speeds in thinner air but consumes fuel faster than in ground effect mode, though the aircraft still performs at a fuel efficiency similar to a Boeing 747-400F aircraft freighter. The Pelican can fly to a height of 25,000 ft (7,600 m), so it can clear all of the world's highest mountain ranges except for the Himalayas.

The aircraft takes off and lands at airfields differently from conventional airliners because of the Pelican's unusual landing gear configuration. A typical aircraft pitches its nose up right before final liftoff or touchdown, but the Pelican appears to have little or no rotation. Like the Boeing B-52 Stratofortress strategic bomber, the Pelican seems to levitate on or off the ground.

=== Fuselage ===
A double-deck structure with a rectangular cross-section, the fuselage is 400 ft (122 m) long and is unpressurized except within the cockpit. It is capped in front by a large swing-nose door, which allows for loading and unloading cargo through both decks, and in back by conventional tailfin and tailplane stabilizers attached directly to the fuselage, instead of the heavier T-tail empennage that is typically used by other ground effect planes. The main deck has a cabin area that is 50 ft (15 m) wide and 200 ft (61 m) long. For military purposes, the upper deck is designed to carry troops or cargo containers, while the main deck has a height of 18 ft 4 in (5.6 m) so that it can hold oversized vehicles such as tanks or helicopters.

=== Wings ===
A cross-sectional view of the undrooped part of the wing, showing a container stored within the cavity.

A cross-sectional view of the fuselage-wing join. Note how the upper deck aligns with the wing cavity.

The aircraft's wings are mounted to the fuselage in a high wing configuration, and they are unswept and mostly parallel to the ground in their inner sections. The wings droop downward in their outer sections to enhance ground effect, also having a slight backward sweep in the leading edge and forward sweep in the trailing edge. To let the aircraft change shape for different types of operations, the wings are hinged within the drooping sections, and the axis of rotation is parallel to the fuselage. The wings fold slightly for takeoffs and landings, and they fold about 90 degrees to reduce clearance amounts during taxiing and ground operations. At the ends of the folding wing sections, wingtips droop below the rest of the aircraft by up to 10 ft (3.0 m) when the larger folding wing and the wingtip are in their normal positions. To avoid ground or water contact, the wingtips are hinged for active rotation, as the rotational axis is perpendicular to the direction of flight but not necessarily parallel to the ground. If a wingtip accidentally touches the ground or water, it minimizes the contact by passively swiveling upward and backward, with the clock position moving from six o'clock to three o'clock or nine o'clock, depending on which side of the wing is viewed.

The wings have an area of more than one acre (44,000 square feet; 4,000 square metres; 0.40 hectares) and a mean aerodynamic chord of 97 ft (29.6 m). The wingspan is 500 ft (152 m), although the wingspan can be reduced to as small as 340 ft (104 m) when the wing is folded. There are no leading edge devices or anti-icing systems, but the trailing edge has flaps that span the entire wing. The wings are designed with a large thickness-to-chord ratio to reduce aircraft weight and to hold part of the overall payload, a feature that is unique in modern aircraft and only rarely had been implemented in previous-era aircraft, such as in the Junkers G.38.

=== Power plant ===
Alternate engine propulsion arrangements. Each set of contra-rotating propellers is attached to two engines.

The Pelican is powered by eight turboprop engines, which produce an output of 80,000 shaft horsepower (60,000 kilowatts) each. The engines are about five times more powerful than the engines on turboprop or propfan-powered military transport aircraft such as the Airbus A400M (using Europrop TP400 engines) and the Antonov An-22 (Kuznetsov NK-12MA) and An-70 (Progress D-27). The new engines would probably be a hybrid derived from two General Electric (GE) engines: the LM6000 marine engine, an aeroderivative gas turbine based on the CF6-80C2 turbofan (used on the Boeing 767 and other wide-body aircraft) that powers fast ferries, cargo ships, and stationary electrical generation plants, combined with a core based on the GE90 turbofan, which powers the Boeing 777 wide-body twinjet aircraft. The Pelican's many engines mitigate a single-engine loss scenario, so just as the Boeing 777-300ER can lift its 777,000 lb (352,000 kg; 388 short tons; 352 t) maximum takeoff weight with just one of its two engines working, seven operational engines out of the eight total can provide enough power for the 7.7-times greater MTOW of the Pelican. The power plant converts about 38 percent of the fuel's energy into thrust, a comparable engine efficiency to those in modern wide-body aircraft.

The engines are paired behind four sets of coaxial contra-rotating propellers that are positioned at the leading edge of the inner sections of the wings. A set of contra-rotating propellers has eight blades (four blades on the front propeller and four blades on the back propeller) that are 600 inches (50 ft; 15 m) in diameter, which dwarfs the GE90 turbofan, is at least about two and a half times the size of the propellers on the aforementioned turboprop and propfan engines, and is noticeably bigger than the largest marine ship propellers, although it is less than half as wide as the main rotors on the largest helicopters. While a single engine drives each set of contra-rotating propellers on some common propfan aircraft such as the An-22 and the Tupolev Tu-95 (respectively the heaviest and fastest turboprop-powered aircraft in the world), the Pelican requires the two propellers within a contra-rotating propeller set to be matched with twin engines. This arrangement is due to the amount of power needed to lift the large aircraft off the ground and to ascend to and cruise at high altitude, but one of the engines in each engine pairing can be turned off while cruising in ground effect, as the paired engines are connected by a geared combiner gearbox so that one or both of the engines can turn the propellers.

=== Payload ===
The Pelican has a maximum payload weight of 2,800,000 pounds (1,400 short tons; 1,270 metric tons), which allows an army to transport 70 heavy expanded mobility tactical trucks (HEMTTs) or 52 M270 multiple launch rocket systems (MLRSs). It can carry 17 M-1 Abrams tanks in five rows of three abreast and one row of two abreast. The Pelican can also move ten CH-47D Chinook helicopters, which only use about ten percent of the payload weight capacity and are confined to the main deck due to their vehicle size. While human transportation would typically be in the form of military troops, the aircraft can be used to transport 3,000 passengers as a commercial airliner, though the aircraft is able to ferry the equivalent of 8,000 passengers (including carry-on items, luggage, seats, stowage bins, and other cabin furnishings) if factors other than payload weight are ignored (such as cabin area).

Loading and unloading container cargo.

As a cargo freighter, the Pelican is designed to handle the standard intermodal shipping containers used in shipping, rail, and trucking instead of the smaller unit load devices (containers and pallets) that dominate the air cargo industry. The aircraft is designed to handle two layers of containers on its main deck. The containers are arranged longitudinally within the fuselage in eight rows of five containers, followed by two rows of three containers, for a total of 46 containers in a layer. The upper deck only holds one container layer, but it allows access to the cargo area of the wings, each of which can hold 20 containers aligned parallel to the fuselage in two rows of ten abreast. Within a cumulative cargo area of 29,900 ft^{2} (2,780 m^{2}; 0.69 acres; 0.278 ha), the entire aircraft can transport 178 containers, or the equivalent of a single-stacked, containerized freight train stretching over two-thirds of a mile (1.1 km) long. At the maximum payload weight, a Pelican aircraft holding the maximum number of containers will have an average gross weight of 15,700 lb (7,140 kg; 7.87 short tons; 7.14 t) per container.

=== Range ===
At the maximum payload, the aircraft can travel 3,000 nautical miles (3,400 miles; 5,500 kilometres) in ground effect, which is about the distance between New York City and London. Carrying a smaller payload of 1,500,000 lb (750 short tons; 680 t), or slightly over half of the maximum payload, it can travel 10,000 nmi (11,500 mi; 18,500 km) in ground effect, roughly the distance between Hong Kong and Buenos Aires, taking about 42 hours (1.7 days) in travel time. This distance is greater than the world's longest airline flights, and it is just short of the 10,800 nmi great-circle distance (12,400 mi; 20,000 km) between two antipodes, which theoretically represents nonstop range to anywhere on earth (ignoring geopolitical barriers, headwinds, and other factors). The aircraft can alternatively carry that payload at high altitude with a decreased range of about 6,500 nmi (7,480 mi; 12,000 km), or approximately the distance between New York City and Shanghai.

=== Ground accommodation ===
A side view of the fuselage, showing a row of 19 landing gears distributed along the fuselage. The fuselage has a landing gear row underneath its left and right sides.

Unlike the typical tricycle undercarriage of most airliners, the undercarriage arrangement for the Pelican distributes the aircraft's weight on ground over two rows of 19 inline landing gears, which are mounted on each side directly under the length of the fuselage. Each landing gear row contains dual-wheel retractable landing gears distributed over about 180 ft (55 m) in length, with an average center-to-center distance of 10 ft (3 m; 120 in; 3,048 mm) between each inline landing gear. As the landing gear rows are spaced about 45 ft (14 m) apart from each other, the Pelican's wheel span may meet the code letter F standard of the International Civil Aviation Organization (ICAO) Aerodrome Reference Code, which is used for airport planning purposes. While only the nose landing gear can be steered on most airliners, each landing gear on the Pelican is steerable, so the aircraft can more easily perform crosswind landings and complete turns at a smaller radius when it is on the ground.

The combined 76 aircraft tires on the Pelican far exceeds the 32 wheels of the current largest cargo aircraft, the Antonov An-225. The average load per wheel is 78,900 lb (35,800 kg; 39.5 short tons; 35.8 t), or meaningfully larger than the typical maximum design load of 66,000 lb (30,000 kg; 33 short tons; 30 t) for large, long-range aircraft. Pavement loading from the Pelican may be comparatively low, though. Boeing claims that the aircraft's ground flotation characteristic, a measure tied to the ground's ability to keep a vehicle from sinking, at maximum takeoff weight is superior to that of the much-smaller McDonnell-Douglas DC-10, which imposes the most demanding flotation requirements among aircraft of its era. However, according to the designer of the Aerocon Dash 1.6 wingship (a larger, sea-based ground effect vehicle that was investigated by DARPA a few years before the Pelican was proposed), regular Pelican operation at airports with high water tables underground may result in a type of seismic wave that leads to cracks in airport terminal buildings and eventually causes greater damage within months.

A landing gear, which is steerable and holds two wheels.

A conventional takeoff and landing (CTOL) aircraft, the Pelican requires a takeoff runway length of 8,000 ft (2,400 m) at MTOW, which is shorter than the listed distance required for the much-lighter Boeing 747-400F. For Pelican landings, a satisfactory airfield meets the desired runway length and width of 5,500 and 100 ft (1,676 and 30 m), respectively, and has a load classification number (LCN) of at least 30 if paved or 23 if unpaved. The aircraft may also be able to use a marginal airfield, which has a minimum runway length of 4,000 ft (1,219 m), width of 80 ft (24 m), and an LCN (if known) of 30 paved or 23 unpaved. A runway with an LCN of 30 can thus withstand the Pelican at lower weights, but it should not host some versions of the narrow-body Boeing 737 (including the popular 737-800) nor most versions of the 777, regardless of whether the runway is long and wide enough to handle those other planes. Boeing maintains that many military airfields are able to host aircraft that have the Pelican's large wingspan, adding that in the conflict regions of Southwest Asia from the Fertile Crescent and the Arabian peninsula eastward to Pakistan, at least 323 airfields meet the satisfactory landing criteria, with additional airfields that can meet the marginal criteria or be restored to satisfactory or marginal. The aircraft's length and wingspan, however, make the Pelican too big for the "80-meter box," the informal name of the maximum size specified in the ICAO Aerodrome Reference Code.

The Pelican requires at the least a ramp or elevator to load and unload cargo. A more ideal setup is to build dedicated ground infrastructure at airports for transloading, such as cranes, railcars, and apron jacks, which approaches the sophistication of container terminal facilities used at the docks of major marine ports.

== Specifications ==
General characteristics

- Capacity: 3,000 passengers and 2,800,000 lb (1,300,000 kg)
- Length: 400 ft 3 in (122 m)
- Wingspan: 340 ft (100 m) folded; 500 ft (150 m) unfolded; effective wingspan of 850 ft (260 m) in ground effect mode
- Height: 18.3 ft (5.6 m) (fuselage main deck interior)
- Wing area: 44,000 sq ft (4,100 m^{2}) or more
- Aspect ratio: 5.4 (effective AR of 15.8 in ground effect)
- Wetted aspect ratio: 1.56
- Empty weight: 2,160,000 lb (979,760 kg)
- Max takeoff weight: 6,000,000 lb (2,721,554 kg)
- Cabin dimensions, main deck (height x width x length): 18.3 ft × 50 ft × 200 ft (5.6 m × 15.2 m × 61.0 m)
- Cargo area: 29,900 ft^{2} (2,780 m^{2}; 0.69 acres; 0.278 ha)
- Cargo container capacity: 178 TEUs
- Fuel capacity: 2,200,000 lb (1,000,000 kg; 1,100 short tons; 1,000 t)
- Mean aerodynamic chord: 97 ft (30 m)
- Example cargo:
  - 10 CH-47D Chinook helicopters (using only the main deck)
  - 70 heavy expanded mobility tactical trucks (HEMTTs)
  - 52 M270 multiple launch rocket systems (MLRSs)
  - 17 M-1 Abrams tanks
- Powerplant: 8 × LM6000-GE90 hybrid turboprops, 80,000 shp (60,000 kW) each
- Propellers: one four-bladed propeller per engine
- Propellers: 50 ft (15 m) diameter

Performance

- Cruise speed: 240 kn (280 mph, 440 km/h) in ground effect mode; 400 knots (741 km/h; 460 mph) at 20,000 feet
- Service ceiling: 25,000 ft (7,600 m)
- Lift-to-drag: 21 (36 in ground effect; 45 in ground effect with winglets in unswept position)
- Range:
  - At 1,400-short-ton payload (2,800,000 lb; 1,300,000 kg; 1,300 t) in ground effect: 3,000 nmi 3,400 mi; 5,500 km
  - At 1,110-short-ton allowable cargo load (ACL) (2,220,000 lb; 1,010,000 kg; 1,010 t) in ground effect: 6,000 nmi (6,900 mi; 11,000 km)
  - At 750-short-ton payload (1,500,000 lb; 680,000 kg; 680 t):
    - 10,000 nmi (12,000 mi; 19,000 km) in ground effect
    - 6,500 nmi (7,500 mi; 12,000 km) at 20,000 feet

== See also ==
Aircraft of comparable role, configuration, and era

- A-90 Orlyonok
- Aerocon Dash 1.6 wingship
- Beriev Be-2500
- EKIP "Tarielka"
- Lun-class ekranoplan
- TsAGI HCA-LB

Later Designs

- Liberty Lifter

== Bibliography ==
- MacDonald, Doug (Autumn 2004). "Ultra Large Transport Aircraft – The Pelican Ultra" (PDF). National Emergency Response. Vol. 18, no. 1. Countrywide Austral. pp. 26–27. ISSN 0816-4436. OCLC 4808936616 – via Australian Institute Of Emergency Services.
- Laurenzo, Ron (June 1, 2003). "A long wait for big WIGs: The answer to whether we will ever see large, operational wing-in-ground-effect craft may rest at the bottom of the Caspian Sea". Features. Aerospace America. Vol. 41, no. 6. American Institute of Aeronautics and Astronautics, Inc. (published June 2003). pp. 36–40. ISSN 0740-722X. OCLC 207767011.
- "Boeing Pelican – Bodeneffektgerat projektiert". Flug Revue. January 2003. p. 58. ISSN 0015-4547. OCLC 97541704.
- "Down the Line: Big Bird for Big Loads". Assembly Magazine (published December 2002). December 1, 2002. Archived from the original on September 30, 2018.
- Laurenzo, Ron (October 21, 2002). "Boeing sees big market for biggest-ever plane. (Boeing Co. production and market forecast for its new Pelican cargo plane)". Defense Week. Vol. 23, no. 42. pp. 8–9. ISSN 0273-3188.
- Rawdon, Blaine (October 12, 2002). "Interview: Blaine Rawdon discusses Boeing's new concept airplane called the Pelican". Weekend Edition Saturday (Interview). Interviewed by Scott Simon. National Public Radio, Inc. (NPR) – via Literature Resource Center.
- Kelly, Emma (September 24, 2002). "Cargo Concepts; Ground-effect aircraft detailed". Flight International (published September 24–30, 2002). p. 28. ISSN 0015-3710.
- Knight, Will (13 September 2002). "Boeing considers giant ocean skimmer plane". New Scientist. ISSN 0262-4079.
- Weinberger, Sharon (August 1, 2002). "Boeing pushes technology envelope with conceptual Pelican seaplane". Aerospace Daily. Vol. 203, no. 22. Aviation Week Intelligence Network. pp. 1–2. ISSN 0193-4546.
