= Geostationary Banana Over Texas =

The Geostationary Banana Over Texas project was a plan to launch a banana-shaped, 300 meters long airship over the state of Texas in August 2008. It is unclear whether the plan was a hoax of exposure.

== Overview ==
César Sáez, an Argentinian public artist living in Quebec, Canada, at the time, initially said he planned to create the project using Canadian taxpayer funds. But Sáez later stated, "One thing I love is the issue of truth or hoax, and I love the ambiguity."

The project received at least $148,000 Canadian (approx. $140,000 US) in grants from the Canadian Federal Government and Quebec Province, sparking controversy.

As of 2010, Sáez had accepted the funds and left Canada without producing any tangible results for the two years of payment. However, the plan was still listed as the "current project" on the artist's website as of April 21, 2010. The website no longer exists.

If completed, the airship would be the longest airship ever built, surpassing the 245 meters long LZ 129 Hindenburg.
