= Aerocon Dash 1.6 wingship =

Proposed American vehicle

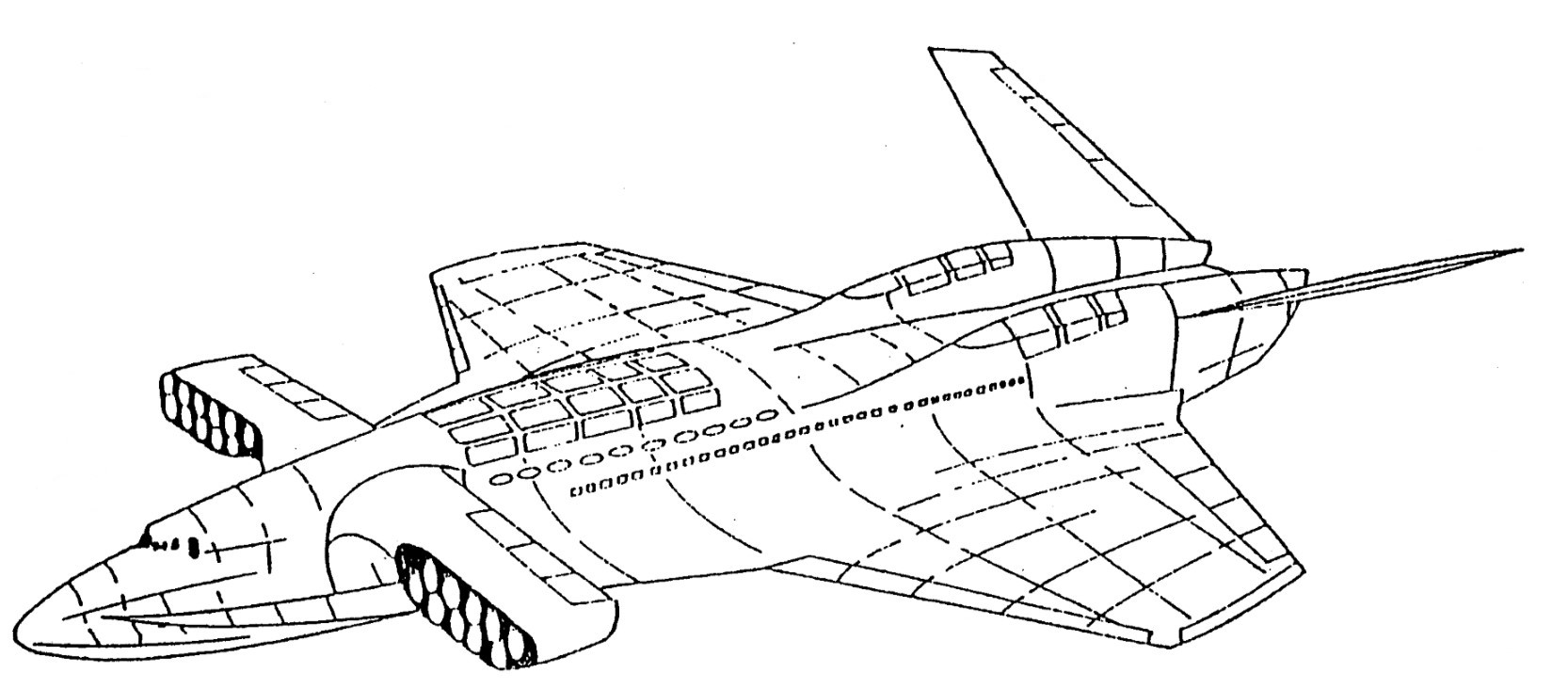
The Aerocon Dash 1.6 wingship, a 5,000-ton ground effect vehicle concept

The Aerocon Dash-1.6 wingship was a proposed American ground-effect vehicle intended to carry large cargos and thousands of passengers over long distances at near-aircraft speeds.

The vehicle was claimed to be able to carry a combination of 1,500 short tons (1,400 t; 3,000,000 lb; 1,400,000 kg) of cargo and 2,000 passengers a distance of 11,500 miles (18,500 km; 10,000 nmi) at speeds close to those of commercial airliners.

The US Defense Advanced Research Projects Agency (DARPA) evaluated the Aerocon design, along with submissions from several other manufacturers, as part of a preliminary study of the concept during the 1990s to determine whether a billion-dollar program was viable, to develop a wingship for military uses. By the end of 1994, the Department of Defense decided that the design was too high a risk and did not offer further funding.

== Specifications ==
Data from W. I.: Technology Roadmap, Appendix C - Structures, page C-4 – C-6

General characteristics

- Capacity: more than 3,000 passengers; 2,000 troops
- Length: 566 ft 0 in (173 m)
- Wingspan: 340 ft 0 in (104 m)
- Height: 112 ft 0 in (34 m)
- Wing area: 38,720.0 sq ft (3,597.21 m^{2})
- Empty weight: 3,588,000 lb (1,627,000 kg)
- Max takeoff weight: 10,000,000 lb (4,500,000 kg)
- Example Cargo capacity. Data from
  - 32 helicopters
  - 20 tanks
  - 4 landing craft
  - 300 105mm howitzers
- Powerplant: 20 × unknown type of jet engines, 90,000 lbf (400 kN) thrust each

Performance

- Cruise speed: 460 mph (741 km/h, 400 kn)
- Range: 12,000 mi (19,000 km, 10,000 nmi)
- Service ceiling: 15,000 ft (4,600 m)
- Lift-to-drag: 32.5
- Wing loading: 258 lb/sq ft (1,260 kg/m^{2})

== See also ==
- Beriev Be-2500
- Boeing Pelican
- Caspian Sea Monster
- HCA-LB
- Lun-class ekranoplan
- Spasatel
