= TTS-IS =

Russian future very large wing-in-ground-effect, lifting-body cargo aircraft

General information
- Project for: very large wing-in-ground-effect, lifting-body cargo aircraft

History
- Initiated: 2017

TTS-IS (Russian Тяжелый транспортный самолет интегральной схемы (ТТС-ИС), heavy transport aircraft integrated circuit (HTA-IC)) is a project by TsAGI for a very large wing-in-ground-effect, lifting-body cargo aircraft with a take-off weight of 1000 tons, a payload of 500 tons, with a flight range of over 6000 km, a cruising speed of 500 km / h. Although the aircraft typically flies at 6 to 12 metres (20 to 39 feet) above water, ice, or ground to reduce drag, it is designed to take off and land at conventional airports, unlike most ground effect vehicles but similar to the Boeing Pelican. As with the Airbus A380 and the Boeing 747-8, the aircraft is designed to land at airports that meet the Aerodrome Reference Code code 4F standard of the International Civil Aviation Organization (ICAO). It is also notable for the use of liquefied natural gas (LNG) as its aviation fuel source, and for the use of intermodal containers that are standardized in train, ship, and truck freight instead of the smaller unit load devices that are common in air freight transportation.

Also called Heavy Cargo Aircraft with Lifting Body (HCA-LB), the aircraft is the result of work beginning in 2014 as a proposal by TsAGI under a Russian government contract. The HCA-LB was formally introduced to the public in January 2017, and it began wind tunnel testing in 2018. The aircraft is targeting for a service entry in the 2030s or later. It carries twenty-foot equivalent units (TEUs) in four rows of six containers side by side on the port and starboard parts of the aircraft, for a total capacity of 48 TEUs. The two cargo areas are separated by an insulated fuel tank stretching the length of the center fuselage, holding cryogenic liquefied natural gas (LNG). The HCA-LB is nominally powered by a row of four turboprop engines positioned behind the cargo, atop the fuselage in a pusher configuration, although the propulsion method will be investigated with greater detail in the future. The HCA-LB has a pi-tail empennage, with the twin vertical tails extending from near the back outer corners of the cargo sections. Outboard of the cargo sections are non-cargo bearing, shorter, thinner swept wings with downward-pointing wingtips.

The HCA-LB is similar in configuration to the Boeing Model 754.

== Specifications ==
Data from Containerized air freight system powered by cryogenic fuel

General characteristics

- Crew: 9
- Capacity: 500,000 kg (1,102,311 lb) payload
- Length: 75 m (246 ft 1 in)
- Wingspan: 95 m (311 ft 8 in)
- Aspect ratio: 3 to 4
- Gross weight: 1,000,000 kg (2,204,623 lb)

Performance

- Cruise speed: 450–550 km/h (280–340 mph, 240–300 kn)
- Range: 6,000 km (3,700 mi, 3,200 nmi)
- Service ceiling: 3,000 m (9,800 ft)
- Lift-to-drag: 25-30 in ground effect
- Wing loading: 370 kg/m^{2} (76 lb/sq ft)

== See also ==
- Natural gas in transportation

Aircraft of comparable role, configuration, and era

- Aerocon Dash 1.6 wingship
- Boeing Pelican
- Beriev Be-2500
- Spasatel

Related lists

- List of large aircraft
