= Undercarriage arrangements =

Aircraft wheel configurations

Below are featured the wheeled undercarriage (also called landing gear) arrangements of some modern commercial jet airliners and large military aircraft.

== Types of wheeled units ==
This table shows the main types of individual, basic wheeled units (single-wheel unit or bogies composed of multiple wheels) used on most aircraft undercarriages.

Symbol	Wheeled unit	Example
	2 wheels, 1 axle	Airbus A380 nose landing gear (consisting of a single 2-wheel bogie)
	4 wheels, 2 axles	An Airbus A330's main landing gear (consisting of two 4-wheel bogies)
	6 wheels, 3 axles	A Boeing 777's main landing gear (consisting of two 6-wheel bogies)
	14 wheels, 7 axles	The Antonov An-225's main landing gear (consisting of two 14-wheel bogies)

The tables below show how various types of wheeled units are arranged to form the undercarriages of some popular aircraft from manufacturers Antonov, Airbus, and Boeing.

== Antonov ==
Aircraft	Wheels and Configuration	Nose section	Center section	Example
An-225	32 wheels [2x2]+[2x14]			The Antonov An-225 with its 32-wheel landing gear. Note the front gear made of two independent, parallel 2-wheel bogies

== Airbus ==
Aircraft	Wheels and Configuration	Nose section	Center section	Example
A318, A319, A320, A321 (standard)	6 wheels [1x2]+[2x2]			An Airbus A319 from bmi
A300, A310, A320, A330, A350-900	10 wheels [1x2]+[2x4]			Airbus A350-900 of Vietnam Airlines
A340-200/300	12 wheels [1x2]+[2x4+1x2]			An Airbus A340-300 from Kuwait Airways. Note the usage of an isolated 2-wheel unit in the central landing gear (similar to the MD-11)
A340-500/600	14 wheels [1x2]+[3x4]			Airbus A340-600 of Virgin Atlantic
A350-1000	14 wheels [1x2]+[2x6]			Airbus A350-1000 of Qatar Airways
A380	22 wheels [1x2]+[2x4+2x6]			Airbus A380 in Airbus markings

== Boeing ==
Aircraft	Wheels and Configuration	Nose section	Center section	Example
717, 727, 737	6 wheels [1x2]+[2x2]			A Boeing 737 from Southwest Airlines
747	18 wheels [1x2]+[4x4]			A Boeing 747-400's main landing gear. Note the toes-up bias angle of the bogies on the wing gear, to ensure correct stowage upon retraction
707, 720, 757, 767, 787	10 wheels [1x2]+[2x4]			A Boeing 757-200 from British Airways
777	14 wheels [1x2]+[2x6]			A Boeing 777-200 from United Airlines. Using 6-wheel bogies, instead of the common 4-wheel bogies (reminiscent of earlier generation Tupolev Tu-154), was visionary for contemporary aircraft at the time of the design of the 777
B-52 Stratofortress	8 main wheels plus 2 outrigger wheels [2x2]+[2x2]			A Boeing B-52 Stratofortress featuring its characteristic landing gear with 8 wheels under fuselage and two outrigger wheels near wingtips
