= Beriev Be-2500 =

Russian super heavy amphibious transport aircraft currently in design and development

Be-2500
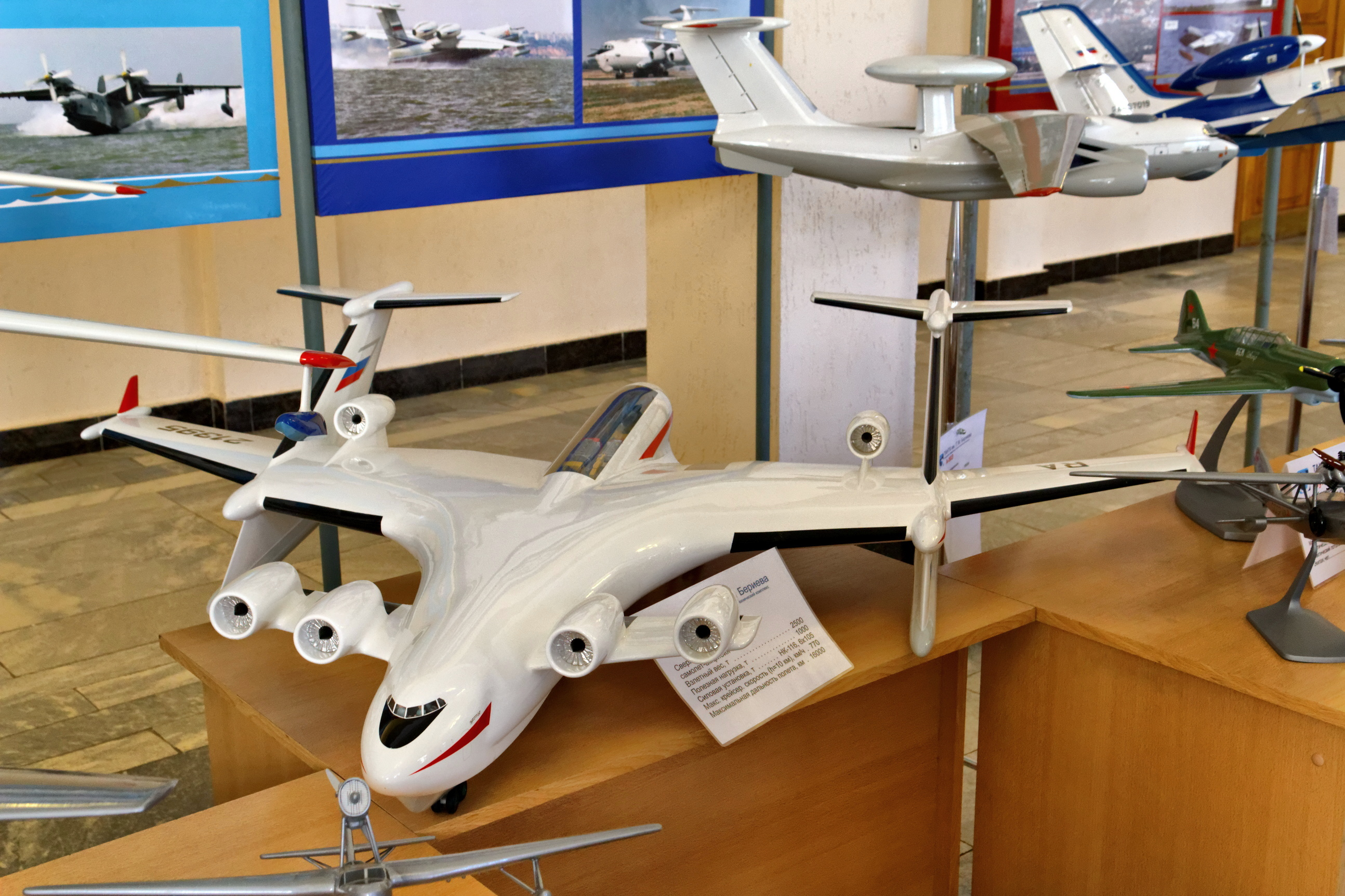

General information
- Type: Wing in ground-effect aircraft
- National origin: Russia
- Manufacturer: Beriev
- Status: Concept

History
- First flight: Never flown

The Beriev Be-2500 Neptun (Russian: Бериев Бе-2500 «Нептун») is a super heavy amphibious transport aircraft that, as of 2007, was in design and development by Russian design firm Beriev. The maximum takeoff weight was estimated at 2500 tons, hence its name.

== Design and development ==
It has been designed to serve both as a conventional jet aircraft, flying at high altitudes transcontinentally, as well as a craft using the ground-effect on intercontinental routes across the sea. It is planned to fly via intercontinental routes, taking off from normal seaports without needing special infrastructure. The concept is thought to have some connection with the Lun-class ekranoplan of the 1970s.

The concept of the aircraft was developed in the 1980s by the Beriev Design Office in collaboration with TsAGI and TsIAM. There are two versions of the design that differ in the arrangement of the gear units and in the geometric design of the dragon structure. Initially, the NK-116 engine was designed to be installed, but foreign engines were also introduced, including the Rolls-Royce Trent 800 and General Electric GE. The NK-116 plans were developed by Samara (Kuznetsov Design Office) by 1994. Beriev is planning to cooperate with foreign partners in the development of the aircraft, including financing issues. It was estimated in 2007 that the cost of a development program would reach $ 10–15 billion.

== Specifications (Be-2500) ==
Data from globalsecurity.org: Beriev Be-2500, Beriev Aircraft Company - Be-2500 amphibious aircraft

General characteristics

- Crew: 2
- Capacity: 1,000,000 kg (2,200,000 lb)
- Length: 123 m (403 ft 7 in)
- Wingspan: 156 m (511 ft 10 in)
- Height: 29.12 m (95 ft 6 in)
- Wing area: 3,428 m^{2} (36,900 sq ft)
- Empty weight: 1,500,000 kg (3,306,934 lb)
- Max takeoff weight: 2,500,000 kg (5,511,557 lb)
- Powerplant: 6 × Kuznetsov NK-116 turbofans, 172 kN (39,000 lbf) thrust each

Performance

- Maximum speed: 800 km/h (500 mph, 430 kn) at 10,000 m (33,000 ft)
- Maximum speed in ground effect: 450 km/h (280 mph; 240 kn)
- Range: 17,000 km (11,000 mi, 9,200 nmi) at 10,000 m (33,000 ft)
- Range in ground effect: 10,700 km (6,600 mi; 5,800 nmi)
- Wing loading: 730 kg/m^{2} (150 lb/sq ft)
- Thrust/weight: 0.00025 kN/kg (0.025 lbf/lb)

== See also ==
- Aerocon Dash 1.6 wingship
- Boeing Pelican
- TTS-IS
