= List of ground-effect vehicles =

The following is a list of WIGE or 'wing-in-ground'-effect craft, also referred to as water-skimming wingships or, in Russia, 'ekranoplans'.

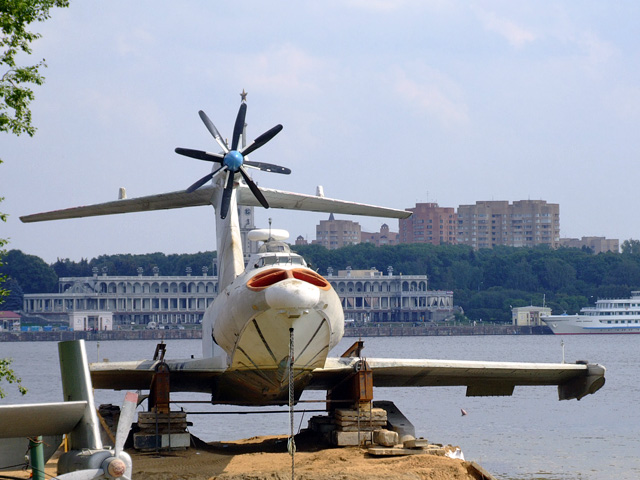
An A-90 Orlyonok, a Soviet-era ground-effect plane

== Australia ==
- Sea Eagle (WIG craft) - six-seater wing-in-ground effect craft

== China ==
- DXF100 (Tianyi-1) - 15 seater wing-in-ground effect craft, designed by China Academy of Science & Technology Development. In 2000, the model is for commercial sale in China. The first buyer of Tianyi-1 used the vehicle to carry tourists around Lake Tai.
- Xiangzhou 1 - 7 passenger capacity wing-in-ground effect craft, 12.7 meters long, 11 meters wide and 3.9 meters tall with a maximum takeoff weight of 2.5 tons.

== Europe ==
=== France ===
- Pennec Navion: Designed and built by Serge Pennec at Geovas, near Brest in Brittany

=== Germany ===
- German Slider - https://german-slider.de
- Seafalcon http://www.seafalcon.net/
- TAF http://www.botec.org/wordpress/wir-uber-uns/?lang=en Germany, but GEV's are in Greece - Kavala at the Aegean Sea
  - TAF VIII-1 two-seater Tandem Airfoil Flairboat Typ Jörg 1, built in 1987. This WIG craft has experienced about 100.000 km and is still in use in private property.
  - TAB Skimmerfoil Jörg 4, built 1980.
  - TAF VIII-2, four-seater Tandem Airfoil Flairboat Typ Jörg II, built in 1983. Following the F&E and test period, Dipl. Ing. Günther Jörg was awarded with the "Phillip Morris Scientific Award" for the Transportation System for the future.
  - Another TAF VIII-2, built in 1994 was given to a Japanese private citizen.
  - TAF VIII-3, eight-seater Tandem Airfoil Flairboat Typ Jörg III, built in 1990.
  - TAF VIII-4 twelve-seater TAF, Typ Jörg IV built in 1986 for coastal protection reasons.
  - TAF VIII-1 two-seater TAF, built 2014.

== Iran ==
- HESA Bavar 2, a two-seater (allegedly) semi-stealth military GEV that entered active duty in 2010.

== Korea ==
- ARON Flying Ship - http://www.aron.co.kr
- Sungwoo Engineering Wing in the Ground Effect Ship
- Wing Ship Technology Corp WSH-500 - http://wingship.com
- Wing Ship Technology Corp WSH-1500 - http://wingship.com

== Russia ==
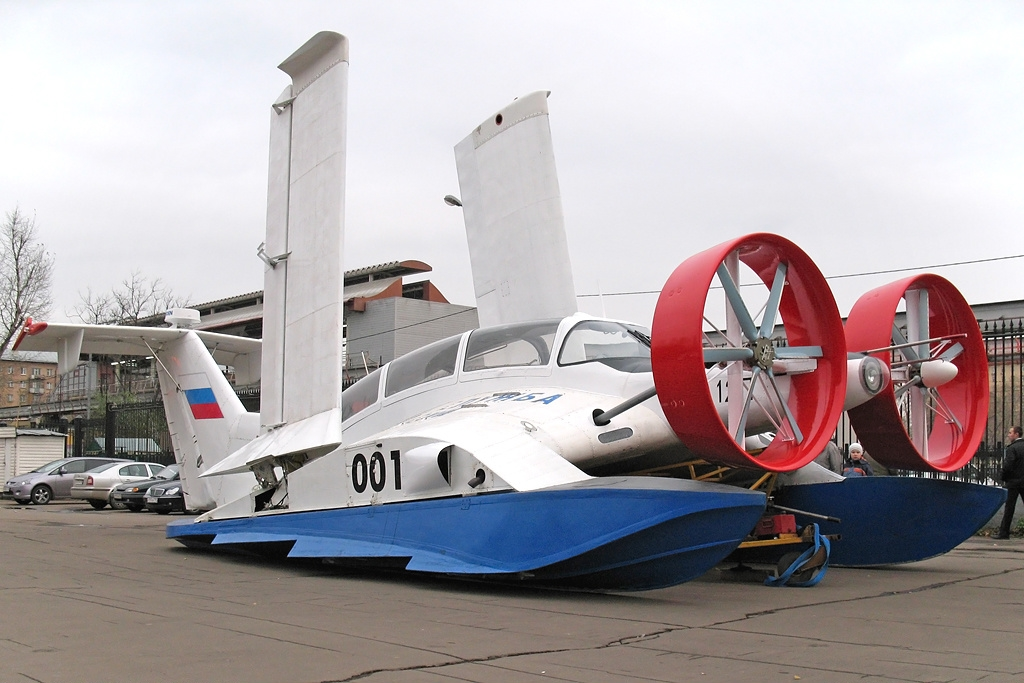
Ivolga EK-12

Civil WIG

- Ivolga EK-12
- Aquaglide-2
- Spasatel - Cancelled demilitarized Lun-class GEV converted into an ambulance craft

Military WIG

- Beriev Be-1 - Experimental aircraft used in development of VVA-14
- Bartini Beriev VVA-14 - Amphibious anti-submarine aircraft, only prototypes were produced
- KM "Caspian Sea Monster" - largest GEV ever built
- Lun-class ekranoplan - Only GEV to be used as a warship
- A-90 Orlyonok - Amphibious transport GEV
- Beriev Be-2500 - Proposed heavy transport GEV
- Aqualet - New 2011 Russian development of Ground Effect Vehicle
- Chaika A-050< "A-050 Chaika-2". globalsecurity.org.
- А-300-538
- A-080-752

== Singapore ==
- AF8-001 (Air Fish) - Widgetworks is developing the AirFish 8, previously known as Lippisch WIG, Flightship, or FS8. The AirFish uses wing-in-ground-effect to reduce drag and travels at speeds up to 80 knots. Currently still in prototype with one built and tested beginning in 2001. Assets of the prior owner were liquidated at auction.

== United States ==
- Aerocon Dash 1.6 wingship
- AirFish 3 and 8 respective 3 and 8 seaters by https://www.wigetworks.com
- Boeing Pelican
- Collins X-112
- Flying Ship Technologies, Corp. unamnned "Flying Ship"
- REGENT Viceroy Seaglider

== See also ==
- Ground effect vehicle
- Ground effect train
