= Caspian Sea Monster =

1966–1980 Soviet ground-effect aircraft

KM
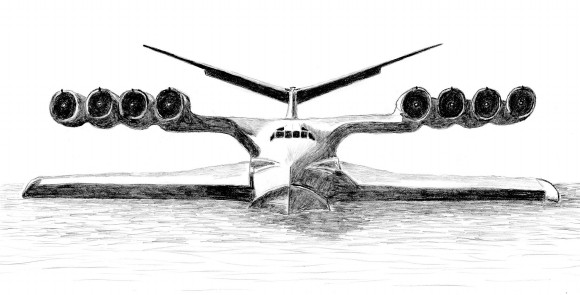
- Artist's illustration of the KM

General information
- Type: Prototype ekranoplan
- National origin: Soviet Union
- Manufacturer: Central Hydrofoil Design Bureau
- Designer: Rostislav Alexeyev
- Status: Destroyed in 1980
- Primary user: Soviet Navy
- Number built: 1

History
- Manufactured: 1964–1966
- Introduction date: 1964
- First flight: October 16, 1966

The KM (Korabl Maket; Russian: Корабль-Макет, literally "Ship-maquette" or "Model-Ship"), known colloquially as the Caspian Sea Monster, was an experimental ground effect vehicle developed in the Soviet Union in the 1960s by the Central Hydrofoil Design Bureau. The KM began operation in 1966, and was continuously tested by the Soviet Navy until 1980 when it crashed into the Caspian Sea.

The KM was the largest and heaviest aircraft in the world from 1966 to 1988, and its surprise discovery by the United States and the subsequent attempts to determine its purpose became a distinctive event of espionage during the Cold War.

== Design and development ==
The KM was an experimental aircraft developed from 1964 to 1966, during a time when the Soviet Union saw interest in ground effect vehicles—airplane-like vehicles that use ground effect to fly several meters above surfaces, primarily over bodies of water (such as the Caspian Sea). It was designed at the Central Hydrofoil Design Bureau, by the chief designer Rostislav Alexeyev and the lead engineer V. Efimov, and manufactured at the Red Sormovo plant in Gorky (now Nizhny Novgorod).

The KM was among the earliest major ekranoplan (English: "screen plane") projects and was notable for its massive size and payload, becoming the largest aircraft in the world when it was completed in 1966. The KM had a wingspan of 37.6 metres (123 ft); a length of 92 m (302 ft); a maximum take-off weight of 544 tonnes; and was designed to fly at an altitude of 5–10 metres (16–33 ft) to use the ground effect. The craft had ten Dobrynin RD-7 turbojets, with two tail-mounted and eight canard-mounted; the eight canard-mounted engines would shut off after takeoff, leaving the two tail-mounted engines to power the craft during normal travel. The KM was undetectable to many radar systems, as it flew below the minimum altitude of detection. Despite technically being an aircraft, it was considered by the authorities to be closer to a boat and was assigned to the Soviet Navy, but operated by test pilots of the Soviet Air Forces. The KM was documented as a marine vessel and prior to the first flight a bottle of champagne was broken against its nose, a tradition for the first voyage of a watercraft.

== Operational history ==
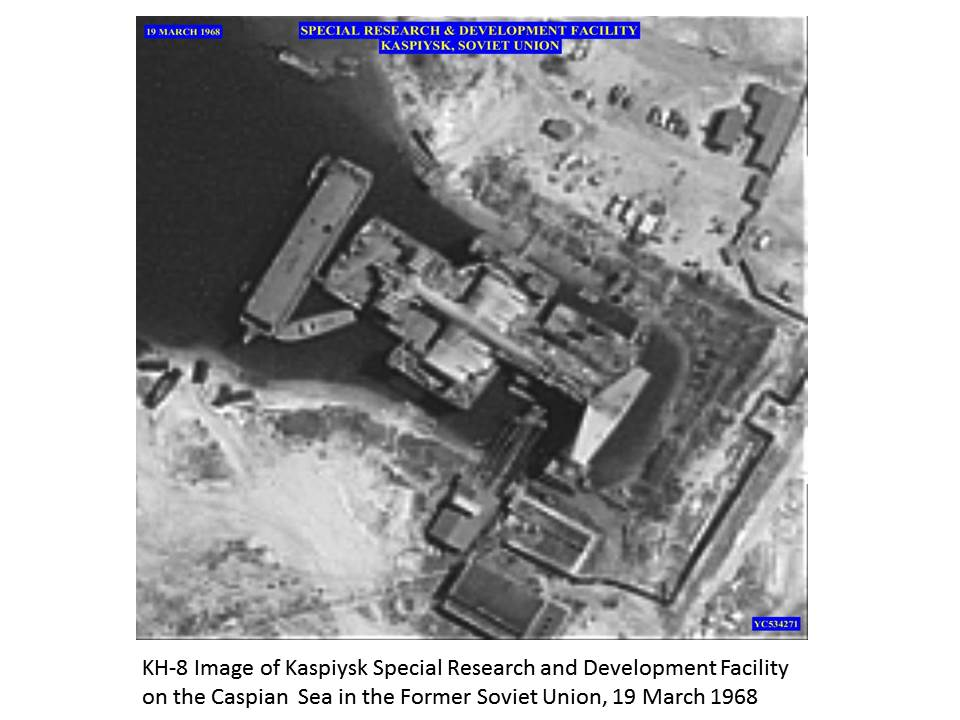
The Caspian Sea Monster at Kaspiysk photographed with a KH-8 reconnaissance satellite in 1968. The ekranoplan featured a constant-chord main wing and a stabilizer with notable dihedral (visible in the image as a difference in brightness between the left and right side of the stabilizer) and an unswept aft trailing edge.

On 22 June 1966, the completed KM began transportation along the Volga River to the testing grounds on the Caspian Sea near the town of Kaspiysk. It was transported from Gorky along the river in secret, covered in camouflage and moving only at night. The aircraft's first flight was on 16 October 1966, performed by Vladimir Loginov and Rostislav Alexeyev himself, which was very unusual as most Soviet aircraft designers never piloted their own creations. All the work was conducted under patronage of the Ministry of Shipbuilding Industry. Testing showed the KM to have an optimal (fuel efficient) cruising speed of 430 km/h (267 mph, 232 knots), and a maximum operational speed of 500 km/h (311 mph, 270 knots). The maximum speed achieved was 650 km/h (404 mph, 350 knots), although some sources claim up to 740 km/h (460 mph, 400 knots).

The KM was at first seen as a promising vehicle specialized for use by military and rescue workers but its design caused many difficulties; progress slowed and Alexeyev moved on to other ekranoplan projects. It was tested on the Caspian Sea for 15 years until 1980, when it was destroyed following a crash caused by pilot error. There were no human casualties, but the KM was damaged and no attempts were made to save it, it being left to float before eventually sinking a week later. The KM was deemed too heavy to recover and has remained underwater at the crash site ever since. No plans were made to build a second prototype. However, the KM later became the basis for the Lun-class ekranoplan developed by the Central Hydrofoil Design Bureau in the 1980s, which saw one example, the MD-160, enter service with the Soviet Navy and later the Russian Navy before being decommissioned in the late 1990s.

The KM remained the largest aircraft in the world during the entirety of its existence and is the second-largest aircraft ever built, behind the Antonov An-225 Mriya that flew for the first time in 1988, eight years after the KM's destruction.

== In media ==
- The 2006 video game Microsoft Flight Simulator X features the KM in a mission. The Deluxe Edition and the Acceleration pack contains additional missions, one of which respectively also feature the KM.
- Episode 1 of the 2008 series James May's Big Ideas, entitled "Come Fly With Me", features the story of the KM.
- The 2007 Japanese animated film Evangelion: 1.0 You Are (Not) Alone features a version of the KM.
- The 2016 PC game Soviet Monsters: Ekranoplans features several ekranoplans, including the KM.
- In the James Bond continuation novel Devil May Care published in 2008, the KM is used by the villain for smuggling.
- In the 007: Blood Stone video game the villain also uses an ekranoplan in an effort to escape from James Bond, but the latter gets onboard and throws the villain off the vehicle, killing him. Later the ekranoplan can be seen docked and cleaned.
- The video game World in Conflict features advanced versions of the KM. In Soviet Mission 11, "Lightning Strike", a group of ekranoplans bombard a seaside air defense base in Norway and land troops on the shore.

== Specifications (KM) ==
Data from The Osprey Encyclopedia of Russian Aircraft 1875–1995, Russia's Ekranoplans: The Caspian Sea Monster and other WiG Craft

General characteristics

- Crew: 5
- Capacity: 50 people
- Length: 92.00 m (301 ft 10 in)
- Wingspan: 37.60 m (123 ft 4 in) * Tail stabilizer span: 37 m (121 ft 5 in)
- Height: 21.80 m (71 ft 6 in)
- Wing area: 662.50 m^{2} (7,131.1 sq ft)
- Empty weight: 240,000 kg (529,109 lb)
- Max takeoff weight: 544,000 kg (1,199,315 lb)
- Powerplant: 10 × Dobrynin VD-7 turbojets (two tail-mounted, eight canard-mounted), 127.53 kN (28,670 lbf) thrust each

Performance

- Maximum speed: 500 km/h (310 mph, 270 kn)
- Cruise speed: 430 km/h (270 mph, 230 kn)
- Range: 1,500 km (930 mi, 810 nmi)
- Ground effect altitude: 4–14 m (13 ft 1 in – 45 ft 11 in)
- Maximum sea state: 1.2 m (3 ft 11 in) (≈ sea state 3)

== See also ==
- Lun-class ekranoplan
- Spasatel
- Bartini Beriev VVA-14
- A-90 Orlyonok
- Liberty Lifter
