= Moskit =

Moskit (Russian for mosquito) can refer to the following Russian military weapons:

- P-270 Moskit cruise missile
- Project 205 Moskit missile boat
