= PAR thrust =

Method of propulsion

Power Augmented Ram thrust (or PAR thrust for short) is the use of displaced air in enhancing the air cushion under the wings or body of what is normally a Wing In Ground-effect or WIG craft. The system can also be used in surface effect ships to increase their top speed.

The configuration can use either the exhaust gases from jet engines or propellers slipstream from either the main engines or special assist engines. This accelerated air is then either ducted, deflected or directed in such a manner that it will pass underneath the wing or body and assist in the creation of an air cushion. The purpose of using PAR thrust is to allow the craft to take off at lower speeds than those required if the system was not used.

Some craft only use PAR thrust during takeoff; notable examples of this are the KM and Lun Ekranoplanes that situated their jet engines forward of the wing and deflected the thrust downwards under the wing. Once airborne and at a speed where sufficient lift was generated by the wing alone, the deflection could be removed. The KM required 10 turbojets to have enough power to take off, 8 of them operating in PAR mode; once in level flight, the engines could be throttled back extensively or some of them even shut off.

A notable spin-off of this technique was the A-90 Orlyonok ekranoplan, which was powered in flight by a massive Kuznetsov NK-12 turboprop (by far the most powerful ever built), and required two large turbofans embedded in the nose for take-off, whose ducts pointed permanently downwards under the wings to provide PAR thrust. These engines were shut down during flight to reduce fuel consumption.

Some other craft such as Burt Rutan's PARLC (Power Augmented Ram Landing Craft), Russian Strizh PE-201, Volga 2, Ivolga and other WIG craft use this system. Boats that use this system (surface effect ships) require permanent use of PAR thrust in order to achieve enough lift for normal operation.
