= Kuznetsov NK-86 =

1970s Soviet/Russian turbofan aircraft engine

NK-86
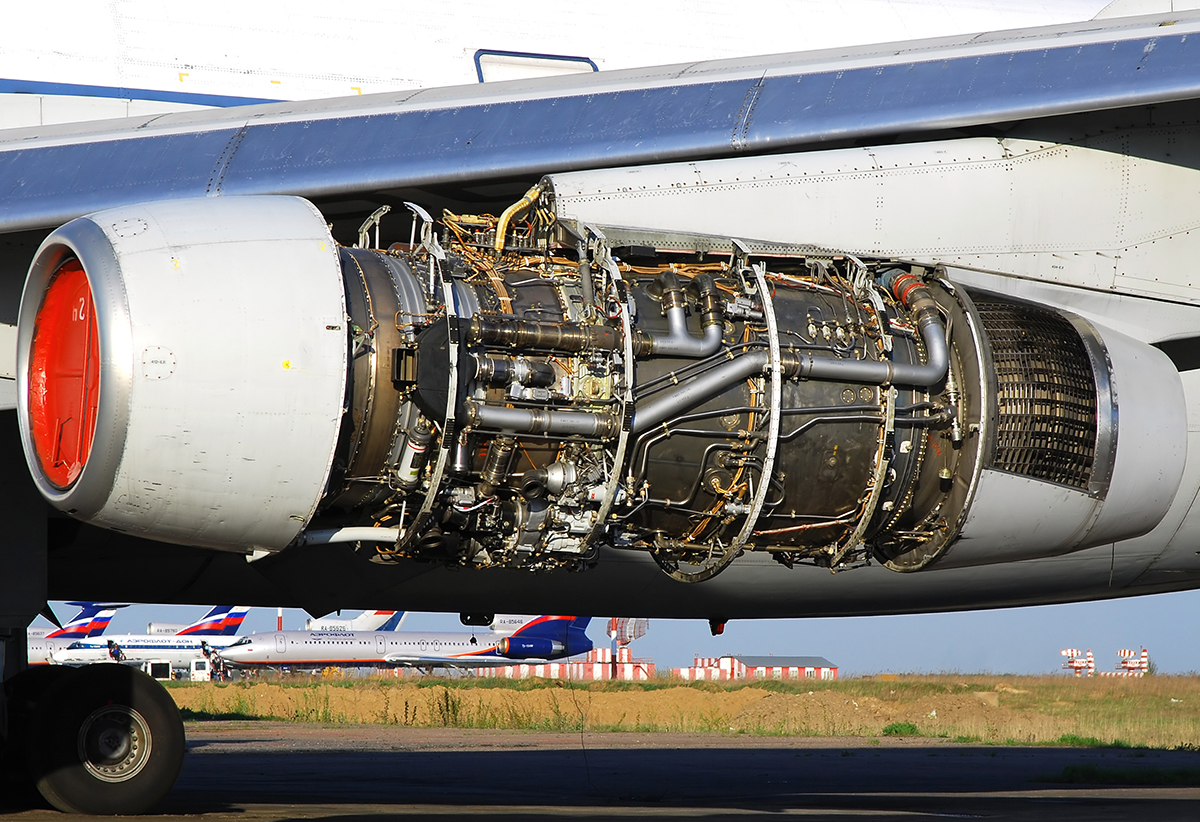
- An NK-86 installed on an Ilyushin Il-86
- Type: Turbofan
- National origin: Soviet Union
- Manufacturer: Kuznetsov Design Bureau
- First run: 1979
- Major applications: Ilyushin Il-86
- Developed from: NK-8
- Developed into: NK-87

The Kuznetsov NK-86 is a low bypass turbofan engine used on the Ilyushin Il-86 rated at 13,000 kgf or 28,600 lbf (127 KN) thrust. It is made by the Soviet Kuznetsov Design Bureau. It is an upgraded version of the Kuznetsov NK-8.

== Design and development ==
In 1974, the Minister of Aviation Industry P.V.Dementev ordered ND Kuznetsov to start the development of the engine for the first Soviet wide-body passenger aircraft – Ilyushin Il-86. Kuznetsov was by then intensely engaged with the improvement of OKB military engines destined for Tu-22M and did not have the resources available to fulfill the requirements and the strict deadline set for the IL-86 program. Kuznetsov decided not to create a clean sheet turbofan design because of time and resource constraints but rather to try to improve and upgrade the Kuznetsov NK-8 turbofan engine by improving several of its characteristics. However, from the outset the chief designer made it clear to the Minister and warned that the fuel economy and power output delivered by the proposed NK-86 will most certainly fall short of contemporary foreign engines. This was due in part to the low values of the turbine inlet gas temperatures and the pressure ratio attained – both of which were unsatisfactory because of limited production technology at that time. Testing began on the NK-86 engine in April 1979.

In 1987, improvements were introduced and designated the model name NK-86A. The modifications and improvements made to the original NK-86 included the addition of monocrystalline rotor blades on the first stage of the turbine, thus improving the turbine inlet temperature to 1280K. The takeoff thrust was also improved to 13.300 kgf (29.260 lbf), while the TBO was increased to 4.000 hrs from the original 3.000 hrs. Also, eight engines were modified to version NK-87 (with corrosion-and heat-resistant coatings, providing reliable operation in the marine environment) which were used to power the Soviet ground effect vehicle also known as Ekranoplans. NK-87 was particularly used in powering the Lun-class ekranoplan which was actively designed as a combat missile launcher.

== Specification (NK-86) ==
Data from Russian Turbojet Engine.

==== General characteristics ====
- Type: Twin-spool low bypass turbofan with stator guide vanes and adjustable blades
- Length: 6,238 mm (245.6 in)
- Fan diameter: 1,445 mm (56.9 in)
- Diameter: 1,600 mm (63 in)
- Dry weight: 2,540 kg (5,600 lb)

==== Components ====
- Compressor: 5-stage LP, 6-stage HP
- Combustors: annular
- Turbine: 1-stage HP, 2-stage LP

==== Performance ====
- Maximum thrust: 13,000 Kgf; 28,600 lbf (127 kN)
- Bypass ratio: 1.15
- Turbine inlet temperature: 1260K
- Fuel consumption: 0.75 kg/kgf hour
- Thrust-to-weight ratio: 5.1
