= Kuznetsov NK-87 =

1980s Soviet/Russian turbofan aircraft engine

NK-87
- Type: Turbofan
- National origin: Soviet Union
- Manufacturer: Kuznetsov Design Bureau
- First run: January 1983
- Major applications: Lun-class ekranoplan; Spasatel
- Developed from: NK-86

The Kuznetsov NK-87 is a low-bypass turbofan engine rated at 127.5 kN (28,700 lbf) thrust. It powers the Lun-class ekranoplan. It is made by the soviet Kuznetsov Design Bureau (now JSC Kuznetsov).

== Applications ==
- Lun-class ekranoplan
- Spasatel (proposed)

== Specifications (NK-87) ==
Data from Otechestvennaya aviatsionno-kosmicheskaya tekhnika - SAMARSKIY NTK

==== General characteristics ====
- Type: Two-spool low-bypass afterburning turbofan
- Length: 20.5 ft
- Diameter: 1,455 mm (57.3 in) in compressor
- Dry weight: 2,200 kg (4,900 lb)

==== Components ====
- Compressor:

==== Performance ====
- Maximum thrust: 127.5 kN (28,700 lbf) at takeoff
- Overall pressure ratio: 13
- Bypass ratio: 1.17
- Turbine inlet temperature: 1,280 K (1,010 °C; 1,840 °F)
- Specific fuel consumption: 54 kg/(kN⋅h) at takeoff

== See also ==
Comparable engines

- Kuznetsov NK-86

Related lists

- List of aircraft engines
