= SS-N-22 =

Soviet anti-ship missiles

The SS-N-22 Sunburn is the NATO reporting name for two unrelated Soviet anti-ship missiles. While being very different designs, distinguishing between them is difficult because their ship-mounted launching containers were identical. Confusion was exacerbated by the Soviet practice of mixing missile types within a class of ships. It was therefore not confirmed that the "SS-N-22" actually referenced two different missiles until after the fall of the Soviet Union.

== Chelomei rocket ==
One of the SS-N-22s was the P-80 Zubr, designed by a team led by Vladimir Chelomei. The Zubr was rocket-propelled and armed with a 250 kilogram warhead. It was carried by early-model Sovremenny-class destroyers and Tarantul-class corvettes. The submarine-launched version of this missile was also designated as an SS-N-22 Sunburn by NATO but was known to the Soviets as the P-100 Oniks.

== MKB Raduga model ==
The other, unrelated SS-N-22 was the Raduga P-270 Moskit. It was ramjet-propelled (though launched by a small solid-fuel rocket), and was carried by later-model Sovremenny-class destroyers, Tarantul-class corvette]]s, and several smaller warships. This weapon has a top speed of Mach 3. The high speed of the missile means a typical response time for the target of only 25 to 30 seconds, giving a target little time to react. Moskit can be armed with a warhead of 320 kg.

Another version of this weapon is called the ASM-MMS or Kh-41; it is intended to be launched by a Su-33.

The People's Republic of China acquired SS-N-22 launchers and missiles (specifically, the for-export 3M-80E Moskit variant) with a 1999–2000 purchase of two Sovremenny destroyers from Russia.According to Russia, the PRC funded the development of the SS-N-22 version for the People's Liberation Army Navy (PLAN). It has the designation 3M-80MBE, and this version differs from earlier versions mainly in having increased range (now beyond 220 km; 240 km has been quoted). These new missiles will be first installed on board the second pair of Sovremenny class destroyers. A total of 500 SS-N-22 AShM were ordered by the PRC for the four Russian-built Sovremenny class destroyers. With the exception of the first 20, these are the 3M-80MBE variant. The PRC has stockpiled roughly 15 SS-N-22 missiles per launch tube (each destroyer having a total of 8 launchers in two quadruple configurations). It is speculated that the PLAN intends to use the missiles against carrier battle groups deployed by the United States Navy in the event of a confrontation with the Republic of China (Taiwan).

Six SS-N-22 launchers were also present on the Soviet ekranoplan Lun.

== Operators ==
China
Russia
Egypt

== See also ==
- Close-in weapon system (CIWS), a countermeasure to anti-ship missiles
