= Large aircraft =

Aircraft for transporting heavy payloads

A size comparison of five of the largest aeroplanes: Airbus A380-800 Antonov An-225 Mriya Boeing 747 Hughes H-4 Hercules Stratolaunch

Large aircraft or heavy aircraft, according to ICAO wake turbulence categories, are aircraft with maximum takeoff weight (MTOW) above 136,000 kg (300,000 lb). For lighter-than-air aircraft (aerostats, e.g. balloons and airships), the term "large" usually refers to airships with more than 4 designed occupants and a gas volume above 3,400 m^{3} (120,000 cu ft) hot air or 1,000 m^{3} (35,000 cu ft) for other lifting gases, as per the EASA European Light Aircraft (ELA1) definitions dictated in Commission Regulation No 748/2012.

Larger aircraft sizes allow more carrying capacities for aviation fuel and payloads (passengers and cargo) over longer distances, and can also improve the overall fuel efficiency and man-hours for transporting a given load. The larger sizes also mean more spaces available inside the fuselage, particularly in the case of wide-body aircraft, which translates to the ability of transporting larger-sized cargo or more flexiblly stacked of lightweight cargo, as well as better passenger comfort due to more available room to install on-board amenities or for people to move around. However, as aircraft sizes increase they pose significant design issues not present in smaller aircraft. These include structural efficiency, flight control response and sufficient power in a reliable and cost-effective installation. Large aircraft, especially fixed-wing aircraft, also require more robust runways for takeoff and landing, specialised ground facilities, and some countries have special regulatory environments for them.

The giant airships of the 1930s are still some of the largest aircraft ever constructed, while the Hughes H-4 "Spruce Goose" of 1947 had the largest wingspan of any fixed-wing type (it's still the largest seaplane ever built, and it had the largest wingspan of any aircraft ever flown until the twin-fuselaged Scaled Composites Stratolaunch first flew on April 13, 2019, with by far largest wingspan, still widest; larger than significantly larger than an American football field). The Hybrid Air Vehicles Airlander 10 hybrid airship is the largest aircraft flying today (by volume, its wingspan isn't largest; the Caspian Sea Monster is still longest, was once largest and heaviest, the even heavier Antonov An-225 Mriya was heaviest until its destruction in the 2022 Russian invasion of Ukraine).

== Characteristics ==
The airship Hindenburg compared to the four largest aeroplanes

=== Payload space ===
The lifting capacity of an aircraft depends on the wing size and its "loading", the weight per unit area that the wing can support. Loading is more or less constant for a given level of technology. Thus, as aircraft size increases the lifting capacity increases with the surface area. For a given aerodynamic form, the area in turn increases with the square of the wing span. If structural efficiency can be maintained, the structural weight of the airframe also increases with its surface area and the square of the span. But the internal volume increases with the cube of the span.

For example, if the dimensions are all doubled in size, then the area and lifting capacity increase 2 × 2 = 4 times, while the volume increases 2 × 2 × 2 = 8 times.

For a passenger aircraft, this doubling in size allows up to twice the cabin space per passenger. Alternatively, for a transport it allows up to twice the space to fit in bulky but light cargo. Thus, large aircraft are both more comfortable and operationally flexible in use than smaller types.

=== Structure ===
Although a larger wing carries larger forces, it is also thicker. The main spar in the wing approximates an I-beam, whose depth equals the wing thickness. For a given overall load to be carried, the forces in the beam decrease with the square of its depth. If a wing is doubled in span it is also doubled in thickness. This reduces the forces in the spar by a factor of 2 x 2 = 4, allowing a fourfold increase in the overall load. This exactly matches the increased lift available from the larger wing area.

This means that the metal parts of a large aircraft need be no thicker or heavier than those of a smaller aircraft. However, because these parts must cover four times the area they make the aircraft four times heavier. This again exactly matches the increase in laden weight, so there is no structural limit to how large (or small) an aeroplane can be made.

Large aircraft do still pose a design challenge. The structural members may be no thicker, but they are now twice as long, so stiffness becomes a problem, and the design approach must be adapted to ensure adequate overall stiffness. This is typically achieved by making structural members cellular. For example, the wing spar in a small aircraft may in fact be a simple I-beam with a solid cross-section, but in a larger design the upright part of the beam or "web" will be constructed as an open lattice of trusses in a triangulated structure.

=== Flight control ===
The effectiveness of a flight control such as an aileron depends mainly on its area and its distance from the centre of the aircraft - its lever arm. If the wingspan is doubled, the area increases fourfold and the lever arm doubles, making the aileron 8 times more effective.

With the aircraft being also four times heavier, and with the weight on average twice as far out, it requires 8 times the effort to achieve the same acceleration of the wing tip.

These balance out, so on a large aircraft the equivalent aileron will accelerate the wing tip up or down at the same speed as a smaller aircraft. But on a wing twice the span, the tip must travel twice as far to achieve the same change in aircraft attitude. This takes longer, so a large aircraft manoeuvres more slowly than the equivalent smaller aircraft.

On very large types such as the Airbus A380, conventional ailerons alone are not enough, and additional lift spoilers are used to reduce the lift of the downward-tipping wing and increase the roll rate to a practical and safe level.

Similar issues occur with the elevator and pitch control. Without extra design measures to ensure adequate control response, any attempt to make a last-minute correction to the flight path is likely to prove too little too late, making a last-minute landing abort and fly-around difficult and dangerous.

=== Engines ===
The number of engines on an aircraft affects its reliability and safety. The more engines there are, the safer it is if one engine fails. But on the other hand, the more engines there are, the more likely there is to be a failure of one or more and the greater the workload on the flight engineer. Nowadays, two engines are preferred in practice, with even quite large wide-body aircraft having only two engines. Four is generally accepted as the limit, for both safety and cost reasons.

Barring a few military types, no practical large aircraft has ever had more than four engines. As aircraft get bigger, it therefore becomes necessary to design bigger engines.

The airspeed of a fan blade must be kept below the speed of sound in order to avoid damaging and noisy shock waves. This maximum speed of the tip sets a limit on the rate of rotation. For a given rate of rotation, the tip of a larger fan will travel faster. So to keep down the top speed of a large engine, the fan must spin more slowly. The fan is driven by a turbine off the same shaft, so the turbine blades also spin round more slowly.

== Operations ==
In practice, the operational savings inherent in flying fewer aircraft make larger types more economical on routes which can sustain their size.

However, ground facilities such as runways, handling facilities and hangars must be enlarged to cope, and the expense of this must be offset against the lower operating cost. The limited width available at some airports restricts the wing span achievable on a practical aircraft.

=== Regulatory definitions ===
In the regulation of air activity, authorities pose additional rules and restrictions on types above a certain size.

The American Federal Aviation Administration defines a large aircraft as any aircraft of more than 12,500 pounds (5.7 tonnes) maximum certificated takeoff weight.

The European Aviation Safety Agency (EASA) defines a large aircraft as either "an aeroplane with a maximum take-off mass of more than 5,700 kilograms (12,600 pounds), a multi-engined helicopter or a gas airship with a volume of more than 15 000 m3."

== History ==
The first practical aircraft were balloons, used for sport and for military observation. In 1901 the giant balloon Preusen (Prussia) of 8,400 cubic metres (300,000 cu ft) rose to a height of 9,155 metres (30,036 ft). Early airships were little more than elongated balloons with an engine slung underneath. These craft were limited in size because their bodies were non-rigid and could not be made too long. The German Count Ferdinand von Zeppelin realised that a rigid frame could support a much larger volume, and in 1900 the Luftschiff Zeppelin 1 of 11,300 cubic metres (400,000 cu ft) volume and 128 metres (420 ft) length took briefly to the air.

Early fixed-wing aeroplanes were mostly single-engined. When the Russian Igor Sikorsky designed and flew his Ilya Muromets in 1913 it became not only the first four-engined aircraft but, with a wing span of 29.8 metres (98 ft) and laden weight of 4,600 kilograms (10,100 lb), by far the largest and heaviest to date. By comparison the LZ 18 airship, which flew the same year, was 158 metres (518 ft) long (the envelope had a capacity of 270,000 m^{3} (9,500,000 cu ft)) and an empty weight of 20 tonnes.

The Beardmore Inflexible of 1928 had a wingspan of 157 ft 6 in (48.01 m) and an all up weight of 37,000 lbs. However, it was underpowered for such a heavy aircraft. It was structurally advanced for its time, being of all-metal stressed-skin construction. The Dornier Do X was the largest, heaviest, and most powerful flying boat in the world when it flew in 1929, having a similar span of 48 m (157 ft 6 in) and a maximum takeoff weight of 56,000 kg (123,459 lb).

During the years between the two World Wars, only the Soviet Tupolev ANT-20 Maxim Gorki landplane of 1934 was larger at 63.00 m (206 ft 9 in) span, but at 53 metric tons maximum takeoff weight it was not as heavy as the Do X's 56 tonnes.

The largest airship ever built was the Zeppelin LZ 129 "Hindenburg". First flying in 1936, the Hindenburg had a volume of 200,000 cubic metres (7,100,000 cu ft) and a length of 245 metres (804 ft). Its maximum payload, of combined passengers and freight, was 19,000 kilograms (42,000 lb). Following the Hindenburg's disastrous end, no airships of this scale have since been built.

By then, larger aeroplanes—especially long-distance flying boats—had exceeded the Ilya Muromets in scale. Then, during World War II, America foresaw a requirement for a large trans-Pacific cargo carrier able to operate from bases with no prepared landing strip. The giant Hughes H-4 Hercules flying boat was constructed from timber, earning it the name the "Spruce Goose". When finally flown briefly in 1947, its 97.82 metres (320 ft 11 in) wingspan made it the largest plane ever to fly until the Stratolaunch at 117 metres (385 ft) was flown for the first time on April 13, 2019. It required 8 Pratt & Whitney R-4360 Wasp Major radial engines to get it into the air. By then, the landplane had taken over long-distance flight and the H-4 - having made no more than a single mile-long flight less than 100 ft off the water - never flew again. It is today preserved as a museum piece.

At the start of the Second World War, Barnes Wallis proposed a "Victory Bomber" of 50 tonnes to carry a 10-tonne bomb but it was discounted by the Air Ministry because of its limited application. As the war progressed the British contemplated very large bomber designs (from 75 to 100 tonnes with bombloads of 25 tonnes and six or more engines) but considered the time required to bring them into use, the difficulty of balancing bombload, defensive armament and range, and the success of existing designs (such as the Avro Lancaster) to outweigh any advantages. Some of the work on large aircraft fed into the post-war Bristol Brabazon a 70-m wingspan 130-tonne airliner which would have given its 100 passengers ship-like levels of space and comfort.

With the arrival of the jet age, airliners continued to increase in size. Wide-body types were introduced and, in 1970, the Boeing 747 "Jumbo jet" entered service. It featured a short second, upper deck to provide increased passenger accommodation. Variants of the 747 remained the largest airliners flying for well over thirty years, some with a "stretched" upper deck, until the arrival of the Airbus A380 series in 2007 featuring a full-length upper deck. Both lines continue to be developed, with ever-larger variants being introduced. The largest is currently (2014) the A380-800, capable of seating up to 853 people.

In order to airlift the Buran space shuttle, in 1988 Soviet Union introduced the sole Antonov An-225 Mriya (dream). With a maximum takeoff weight greater than 640 tonnes (1,410,000 lb) and a wing span of 88.4 metres (290 ft), it was the largest operational aeroplane in the world. Since the conclusion of Buran flights, the Mriya remained in service as a heavy transport plane until its destruction in the Battle of Antonov Airport during the 2022 Russian invasion of Ukraine.

The largest aircraft of any kind flying today (2014) is the Hybrid Air Vehicles Airlander 10 hybrid airship, with an internal capacity of 38,000 cubic metres and a length of 91 m.

== Largest built ==
These lists show the historical progression in size for each major class of aircraft: balloon, airship, aeroplane and rotorcraft. Hybrids are listed under the biggest component whether it be envelope length, wingspan or rotor diameter. -->

=== Balloons ===
Date	Type	Diameter	Volume	Country	Role	Status	Notes
1901	Preusen ("Prussia")		8,400 cu m (300,000 cu ft)	Germany	Experimental	Prototype	

=== Airships ===
Date	Type	Length	Volume	Country	Role	Status	Notes
1900	Zeppelin LZ 1	128 m (420 ft)	11,300 cu m (400,000 cu ft)	Germany	Experimental	Prototype	First successful rigid airship.
1921	R38 (UK), ZR-2 (US)	211.8 m (695 ft)	2,724,000 cu ft	United Kingdom	Patrol	Prototype	built for Royal Navy, sold to US Navy before completion.
1929	R100	216.1 m (709 ft)	193,970 cu m (5,156,000 cu ft)	United Kingdom	Transport	Prototype	
1930	R101	236.83 m (777 ft)	155,992 cu m (5,508,800 cu ft)	United Kingdom	Transport	Prototype	Longer than R100 when first constructed but smaller volume: after lengthening in 1930 both longer and greater volume.
1931	USS Akron (ZRS-4)	239.27 m (785 ft)	193,970 cu m (6,850,000 cu ft)	United States	Aircraft carrier	Operational	Sister ship USS Macon (ZRS-5)
1936	LZ 129 Hindenburg	245 m (804 ft)	200,000 cu m (7,100,000 cu ft)	Germany	Passenger transport	Operational	Maximum payload (combined passengers and freight) 19,000 kg (42,000 lb).

=== Aeroplanes ===
Date	Type	Span	Length	Max weight	Country	Role	Status	Description
1913	Sikorsky Ilya Muromets	29.8 m (98 ft)		4,600 kg (10,100 lb)	Russia	Bomber/transport	Production	
1915	Zeppelin-Staaken V.G.O. I	42.2 m (138 ft 6 in)		9520 kg (20,944 lb)	Germany	Bomber	Production	
1919	Tarrant Tabor	40.02 m (131 ft 3 in)		20,305 kg (44,672 lb)	Britain	Bomber	Prototype	
1929	Dornier Do X	40.05 m. (131 ft 4 in)	48 m (157 ft 5 in)	51,900 kg (114,400 lb)	Germany	Transport flying boat	Operational (3 built)	
1934	Tupolev ANT-20 Maxim Gorki	63 m (206.7 ft)		53 t	USSR	Transport	Operational	2 built.
1942	Boeing B-29 Superfortress				USA	Bomber	Production	
1943	Junkers Ju 390			34 tonnes (38 tons)	Germany	transport/bomber	Prototypes	Max takeoff weight tested.
1944	Blohm + Voss BV 238				Germany			
1946	Convair B-36 Peacemaker				USA			
1947	Hughes H-4 Hercules	97.82 m (320 ft 11 in)			USA	Transport	Prototype	
1966	Ekranoplan KM	37.6 m	92 m	544 tons	USSR	Experimental	Prototype	
1988	Antonov An-225 Mriya (Dream)		84 m (276 ft)	600,000 kg (1,320,000 lb)	USSR (Ukraine)	Transport	Destroyed	1 flown, a second part-built.

=== Rotorcraft ===
Date	Type	Rotor dia.	Max weight	Country	Class	Status	Notes
1952	Hughes XH-17	129 ft.	43,500 lb (19,731 kg)	USA	Helicopter	Prototype	
1957	Fairey Rotodyne	90 ft 0 in (27.43 m)		United Kingdom	Compound gyroplane	Prototype	40 passengers.
1968	Mil V-12 or Mi-12	114 ft	105 t	USSR	Helicopter, twin-rotor	Operational	

== See also ==
- List of large aircraft
- List of transport megaprojects
