= Rostislav Alexeyev =

Russian designer of highspeed shipbuilding (1916–1980)

- Ростислав Алексеев
- Alexeyev in 1960
- Born: Rostislav Evgenievich Alexeyev; December 18, 1916; Novozybkov, Chernigov Governorate, Russian Empire
- Died: February 9, 1980 (aged 63); Gorky, Soviet Union

Rostislav Evgenievich Alexeyev (Russian: Ростисла́в Евге́ньевич Алексе́ев; December 18, 1916 – February 9, 1980) was a Russian Soviet Director & Chief of Design known for his pioneering work on hydrofoil ships and ground-effect vehicles. Alexeyev was an accomplished designer of hydrofoil ships, such as the Raketa, and became a prominent developer of ground-effect vehicles, particularly the Caspian Sea Monster and the A-90 Orlyonok.

== Biography ==
Rostislav Evgenievich Alexeyev was born on December 18, 1916, in Novozybkov, Chernigov Governorate, Russian Empire (now in Bryansk Oblast, Russia) to an agronomist father and a teacher mother. In 1933 his family moved to Gorky, and in 1935 enrolled in a shipbuilding course at the Gorky Industrial Institute. Alexeyev graduated on October 1, 1941, after successfully defending his final thesis on hydrofoils, and was awarded the title of engineer-shipbuilder. He was sent to work at the Red Sormovo shipbuilding factory, but the entry of the Soviet Union into World War II following the German invasion of the Soviet Union earlier that year meant the factory was instead manufacturing tanks for the war effort rather than ships.

=== Hydrofoils ===
Alexeyev initially served as a foreman for tank production, but in 1942 was reallocated by the Soviet Navy to developing hydrofoils for combat use. His designs were not completed by the end of the war in 1945, but the Soviet government maintained interest in them and 340 hydrofoil vessels had been planned by the late 1940s. Alexeyev continued working on hydrofoils and became chief designer of the Raketa, the first passenger hydrofoil commercially produced in the Soviet Union, which began production in 1957. The Raketa was presented at the International Festival of Youth and Students in Moscow that year, and interest in hydrofoils grew even further. Alexeyev was chief designer for numerous passenger hydrofoil designs produced at Red Sormovo, including the Meteor, the Kometa, the Sputnik, the Burevestnik, and the Sunrise.

=== Ground-effect vehicles ===
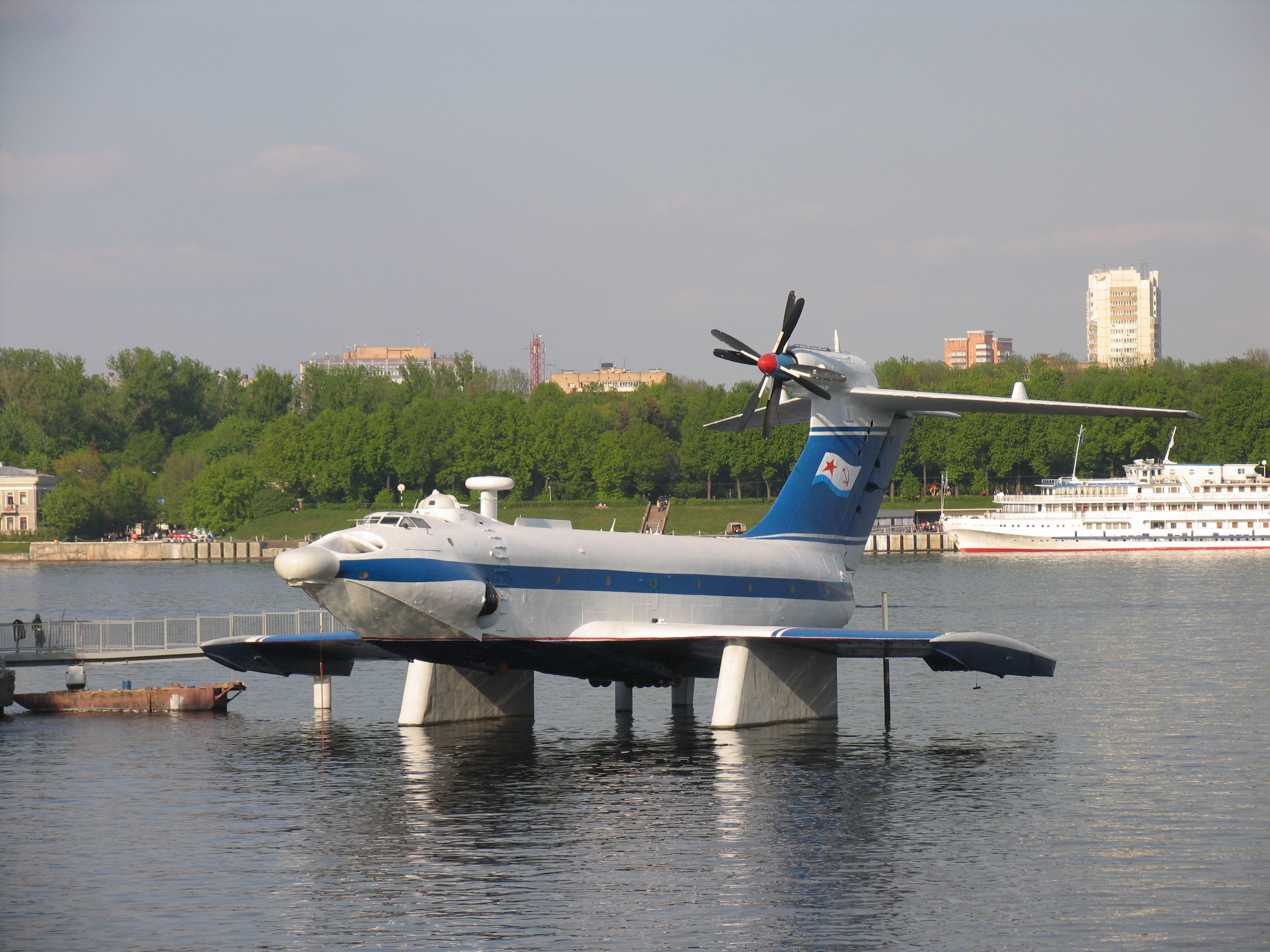
A-90 Orlyonok ("Eaglet") in Moscow.

In 1962, Alexeyev began working at the Central Hydrofoil Design Bureau which specialized in the secret development of ground-effect vehicles, named ekranoplans. In the 1950s the Soviet Union saw a great interest in ground-effect vehicles, which at the time were largely ignored by the rest of the world, and had been developing them at a rapid pace. Ground-effect vehicles were technically aircraft, but operated using ground effect to travel only several meters above flatter surfaces, particularly bodies of water, leading them to be classified as ships by the Soviet government. The Central Hydrofoil Design Bureau planned a massive ekranoplan utilizing the "Wing In Ground" (WIG) effect, and Alexeyev was invited to participate in development due to his expertise with hydrofoils. Only two years after development began the project resulted in the Korabl Maket (KM), better known in English as the Caspian Sea Monster, with Alexeyev as the chief designer and V. Efimov as the lead engineer. When the KM's functioning prototype of the project was completed in 1966, it was largest and heaviest aircraft in the world, but as it was a secret project at the time this benchmark was unknown to the world. It was powered by eight Dobrynin VD-7 turbojet engines on the front of the fuselage, and two on the tail for extra thrust during takeoff. The KM was produced at the Red Sormovo factory in Gorky, then secretly transported along the Volga river to Kaspiysk, where it would be stationed to undergo testing by the Soviet Navy in the Caspian Sea operated by test pilots of the Soviet Air Force. On its first flight on October 16, 1966, the KM was co-piloted by Alexeyev himself, which was unusual as aircraft designers never normally operated their own creations.

The KM was at first seen as a promising vehicle specialized for use by military and rescue workers but its design caused many difficulties, progress slowed and Alexeyev quickly moved on to other ekranoplan projects. The most successful project was the A-90 Orlyonok, which made its first flight in 1972, and was commissioned by the Soviet Navy in 1979. The Orlyonok saw limited use as a military transport vehicle, and three of the five units produced were in active service until 1993.

== Death ==
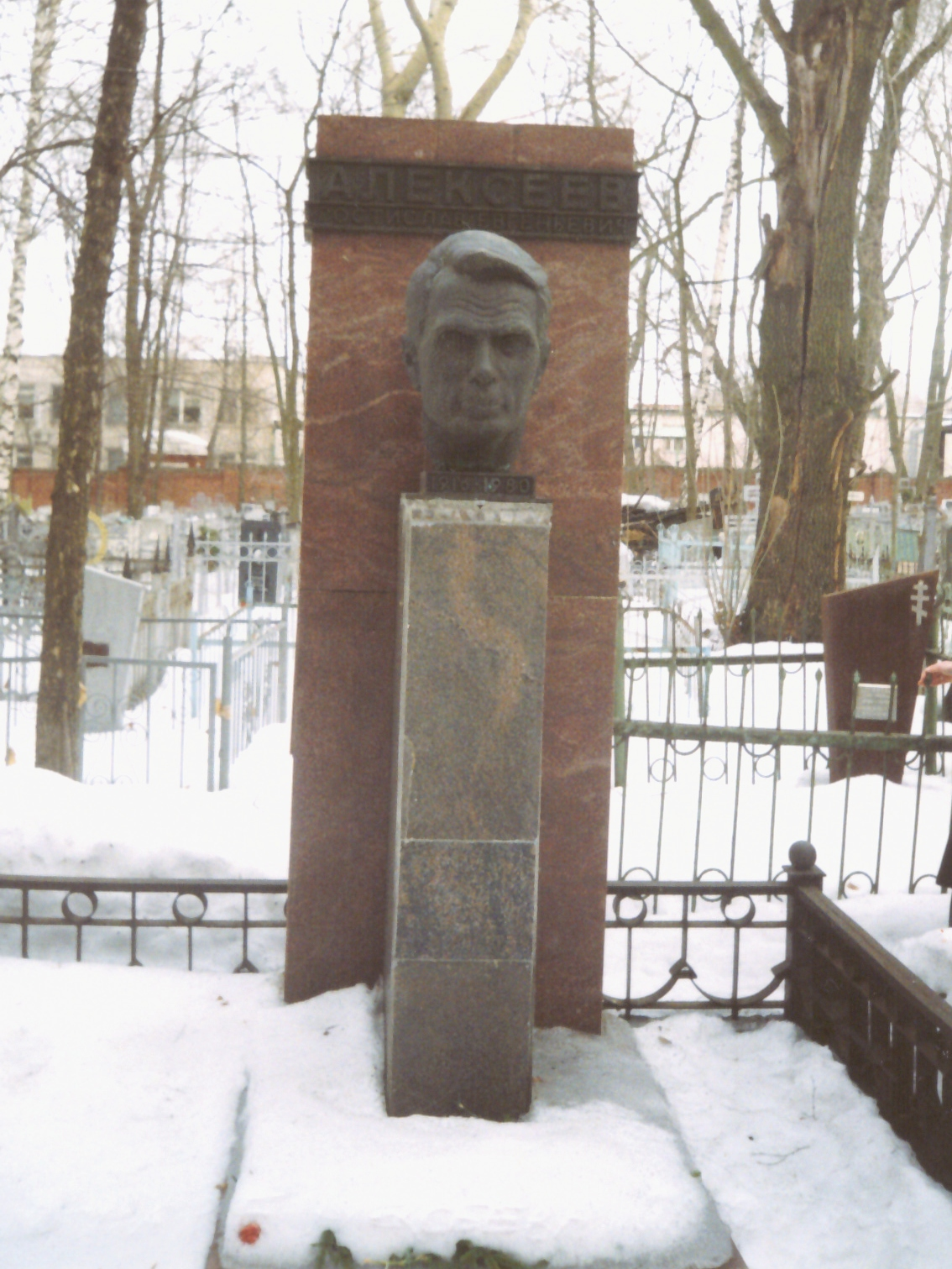
Monument of Rostislav Alexeyev in Nizhny Novgorod, Bugrovskoye cemetery

On January 14, 1980, Alexeyev was injured in an air crash that occurred while testing a new ekranoplan to be presented at the 1980 Summer Olympics in Moscow. The vehicle lost lift and lowered into the water at high speed, and immediately after the accident Alexeyev was removed as chief designer at the Central Hydrofoil Design Bureau and was hospitalized three days later. Alexeyev died on February 9, 1980, following 2 operations.

Alexeyev received numerous prestigious awards, including the Stalin Prize second degree in 1951, the Lenin Prize in 1962, the USSR State Prize in 1984, the Order of the October Revolution, the Order of the Badge of Honour, and the Honoured Inventor of the RSFSR.

The KM crashed in 1980 shortly after Alexeyev's death due to pilot error, and the project was subsequently cancelled, but was used as a foundation for the Lun-class ekranoplan.

After the fall of the Soviet Union development of ekranoplans was almost totally ended, but the details of Alexeyev's work became known to the general public and generated a lot of interest, and he is now generally considered as a father of the ground-effect vehicle.
