= A-90 Orlyonok =

Ground effect vehicle

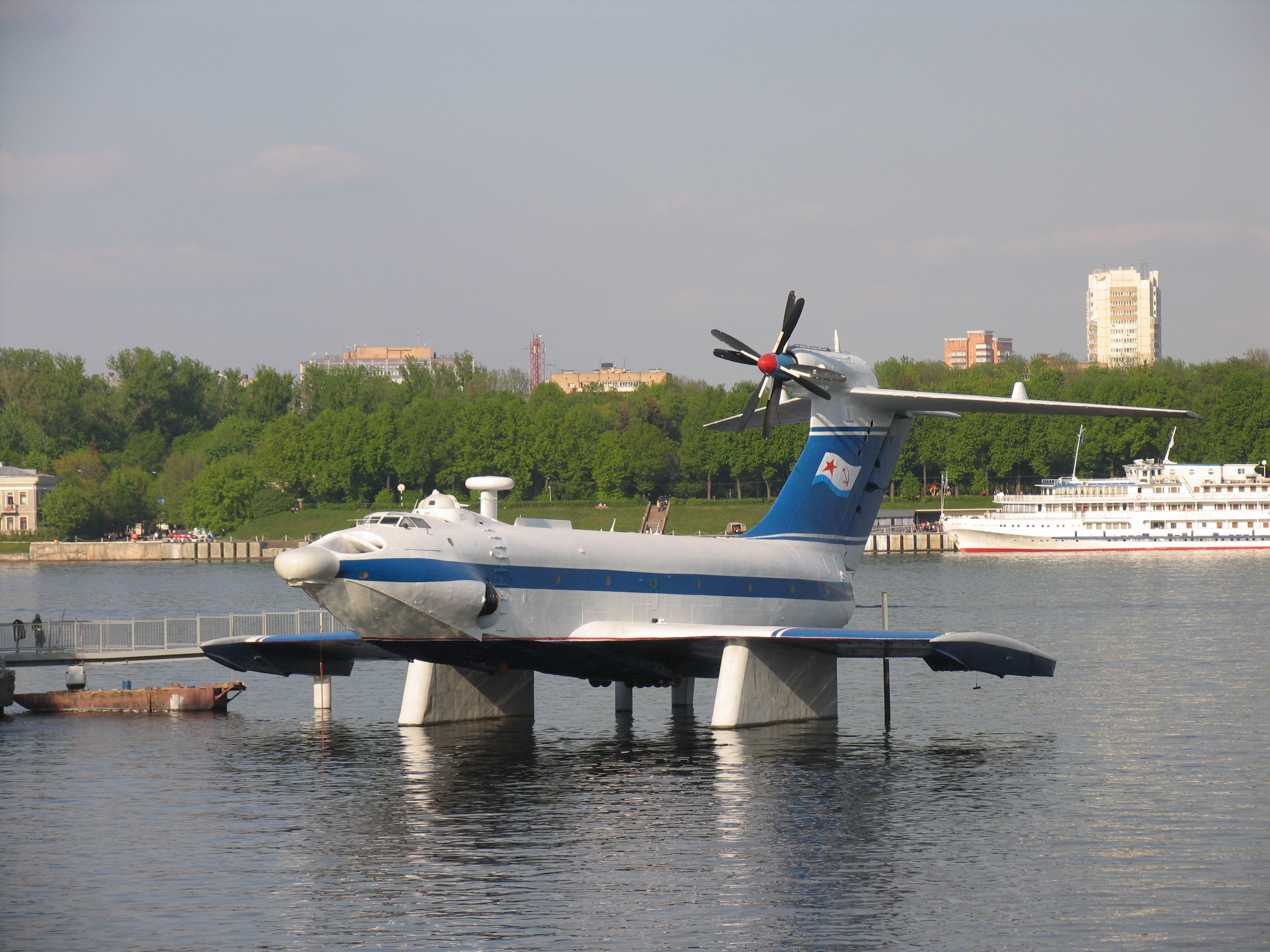
- A-90 Orlyonok in Moscow

General information
- Type: Ekranoplan
- Manufacturer: Central Hydrofoil Design Bureau
- Designer: Rostislav Evgenievich Alexeyev
- Primary user: Soviet Navy; Russian Navy
- Number built: 4 (of which one was a static test airframe)

History
- Introduction date: 1979
- First flight: 1972
- Retired: 1993

The A-90 Orlyonok (Russian: Орлёнок, lit. 'Eaglet') is a Soviet ekranoplan that was designed by Rostislav Evgenievich Alexeyev of the Central Hydrofoil Design Bureau.

The A-90 uses ground effect to fly a few meters above the surface. The Russians classify it as Ekranoplan Class B – it can achieve an altitude of 3,000 m (9,800 ft), placing it between Class A – which is limited to ground effect, and Class C, which exploits the ground effect only during take-offs and landings and otherwise functions as a typical airplane.

== History ==
The Soviet Navy command of the 1960s was very interested in a fast military transport capable of carrying a large payload. The Central Hydrofoil Design Bureau was one of the organizations working on this top-secret project, about which little was known until the fall of the Soviet Union.

Chief Designer R. E. Alexeyev designed several prototypes in the 1960s. At the start of the 1970s, Alexeyev designed a medium-sized ekranoplan to be used as a military transport. The new vehicle was named Orlyonok ('Eaglet'). The first flying unit (S-21) was initially tested on the Volga River in the autumn of 1972, and the next year dismantled and transported to the Caspian Sea for continued testing. In 1975 the S-21 crashed during testing, later proved to be due to a deficiency in the alloy used for the hull. A different alloy was used in all subsequent units built.

== Development and design ==
The Orlyonok was designed as a transport and a beach assault vehicle. Unlike other Soviet Ekranoplan designs, the Orlyonok was amphibious and was equipped with wheels for beaching and land based takeoffs.

Orlyonok's development was preceded by the SM-6; a prototype ekranoplan which had the same module layout as the Orlyonok. Experience gained from the SM-6 was used in the development of the Orlyonok. The SM-6 was on display in Kaspiysk for an unknown period. It was later brought back to Kaspiysk naval base and supposedly scrapped sometime between 2006 and 2008.

The layout of the engines on the Orlyonok was unusual and a testament of the special needs of such an unconventional aircraft. Mounted in the top of the tail, it featured a massive Kuznetsov NK-12 turboprop, the most powerful turboprop ever made, which provided cruise power. The nose of the aircraft mounted two turbofan engines with the intakes on top of the nose and the exhaust along the side of the fuselage, the thrust of these engines being vectored under the wings to produce PAR thrust (increased lift and extra propulsion) for takeoff. Under cruise conditions and in ground effect, the front engines could be shut off since their power was unnecessary to keep the aircraft aloft; this also minimized intake of water, salt and low flying birds.

Both takeoff and landing were assisted with large span-length flaps that greatly increased lift and could capture PAR thrust for increased air pressure. Water landings were assisted with a hydro-ski that extended out of the belly of the craft below the main wings.

The front end of the Orlyonok was hinged behind the radome and the whole assembly could open sideways to speed disembarkation of the infantry it carried, or of a BTR armoured personnel carrier. The Orlyonok had a built in folding ramp that allowed it to load and unload vehicles with no external support.

There were plans to resume production of the Orlyonok. The craft were to have been built in Petrozavodsk.

== Production ==
Overall only four units were built:

- 1 non-flying unit for static testing, scrapped.
- S-21 completed in 1972, damaged in 1975, rebuilt as S-23 in 1977, then lost again in 1992 (the craft was then destroyed as the Russian Navy would not afford the cost for retrieval by salvage companies).
- S-25 completed in 1979, retired 1993, scrapped around the year 2000.
- S-26 completed in 1980, retired 1993, on display at the Museum of the Navy, Moscow.

== Operators ==
- Soviet Union
  - Soviet Navy
- Russia
  - Russian Navy

== Specifications (A-90) ==

Data from

General characteristics

- Crew: 6
- Capacity: 150 personnel / 28,000 kg (61,729 lb)
- Length: 58.1 m (190 ft 7 in)
- Wingspan: 31.5 m (103 ft 4 in)
- Height: 16.3 m (53 ft 6 in)
- Wing area: 304 m^{2} (3,270 sq ft)
- Max takeoff weight: 140,000 kg (308,647 lb)
- Powerplant: 1 × Kuznetsov NK-12MK turboprop engine, 11,033 kW (14,795 shp) mounted at the fin / tailplane junction
- Powerplant: 2 × Kuznetsov NK-8-4K turbofan engines, 103 kN (23,000 lbf) thrust each in the nose
- Propellers: 8-bladed contra-rotating constant-speed propeller

Performance

- Maximum speed: 400 km/h (250 mph, 220 kn)
- Range: 1,500 km (930 mi, 810 nmi)
- Service ceiling: 3,000 m (9,800 ft)

Armament

- Guns: 1 × twin 12.7 mm Utyos-M machine gun turret

== See also ==
- Lun-class ekranoplan
- Boeing Pelican (concept; never prototyped or built)
