= A-050 =

Russian ground-effect vehicle

As of 2015, the A-050 ekranoplan is being developed by the Central Hydrofoil Design Bureau, two concepts of which have been shown at the MAKS Air Show. According to ValueWalk, the model "will feature modern avionics and navigation", having a take-off weight of 54 tons and carrying capacity of 9 tons; it will be powered by R-195 booster engines, and have a cruising speed of 400 to 480 km/h (250 to 300 mph), with a range of 4,800 km (3,000 miles). At the same time, it is thought the ground effect vehicle will be armed with cruise missiles.
