= P-270 Moskit =

Moskit
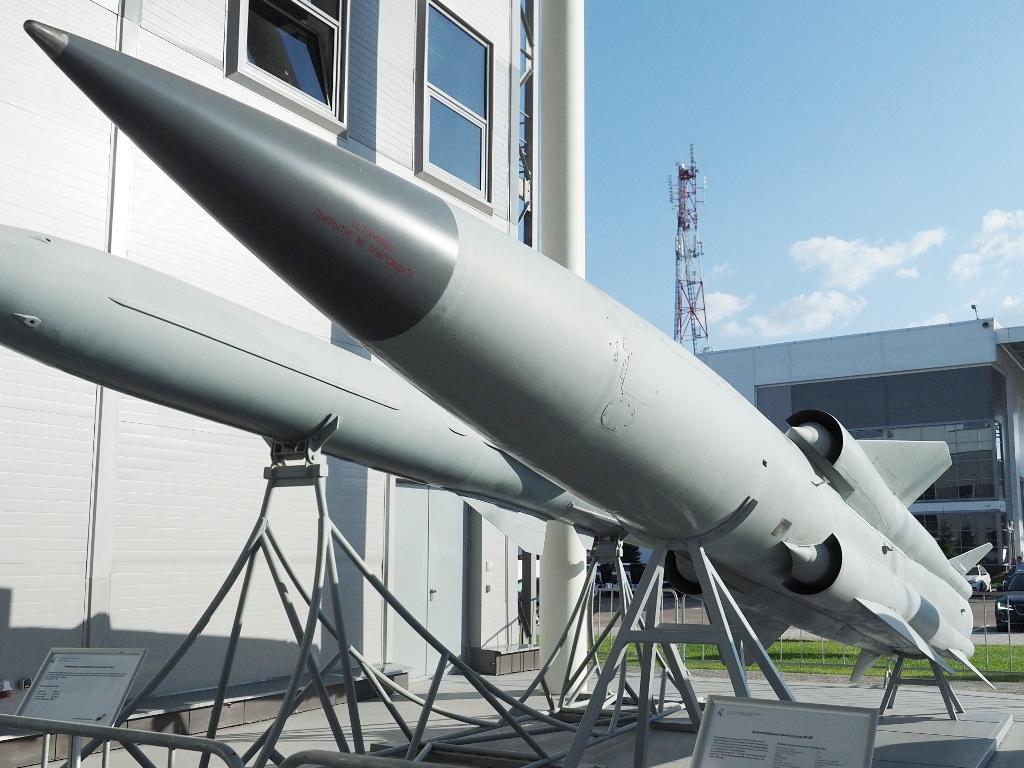
- Type: Anti-ship missile
- Place of origin: Soviet Union

Service history
- In service: 1984 (Note: the first ship with 3M80 missiles was actually ready in 1978, formally adopted in 1981)
- Used by: Soviet Union, Russia, China, Egypt

Production history
- Manufacturer: Progress Aviation Plant
- Produced: 1983

Specifications
- Mass: 4,500 kg (9,900 lb)
- Length: 9.745 m (31 ft 11.7 in)
- Diameter: 0.8 m (31 in)
- Wingspan: 2.10 m (6 ft 11 in)
- Warhead: 300 kg (660 lb) overall 150 kg (330 lb) explosive or 120 kt TNT fission-fusion thermonuclear weapon
- Engine: Four ramjets (solid fuel rocket on air-to-surface version)
- Operational range: 120–250 km (75–155 mi)
- Flight altitude: 20 m (66 ft) above sea level
- Maximum speed: Mach 2-3
- Guidance system: inertial guidance plus terminal active radar homing
- Launch platform: naval ships, fixed-wing aircraft, coastal and road mobile transporter erector launcher

The P-270 Moskit (Russian: П-270 «Моски́т»; English: Mosquito) is a Soviet supersonic ramjet powered anti-ship cruise missile. Its GRAU designation is 3M80, air launched variant is the Kh-41 and its NATO reporting name is SS-N-22 Sunburn (one of two missiles with that designation). The missile system was designed by the Raduga Design Bureau during the 1970s as a follow-up to the P-120 Malakhit (NATO reporting name "SS-N-9 Siren"). The Moskit was originally designed to be ship-launched, but variants have been adapted to be launched from land (modified trucks), underwater (submarines) and air (reportedly the Sukhoi Su-33, a naval variant of the Sukhoi Su-27), as well as on the Lun-class ekranoplan. The missile can carry conventional and nuclear warheads. The exact classification of the missile is unknown, with varying types reported. This uncertainty is due to the secrecy surrounding an active military weapon. The missile has been purchased and exported to the People's Liberation Army Navy (China) and Egyptian Navy (Egypt).

== Design ==
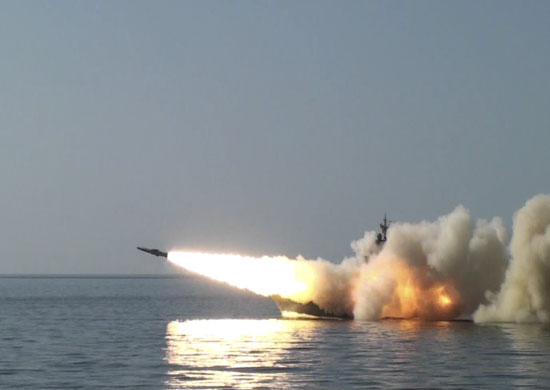
A ship of the Pacific Fleet fires Moskit cruise missiles in the Sea of Japan, 2019.

The missile is capable of reaching a speed of Mach 3 (3,700 km/h; 2,300 mph) at high altitude and Mach 2.2 at low-altitude. This speed is 4.25 to 3 times more than speed of the subsonic American Harpoon. The Moskit was designed to be employed against smaller NATO naval groups in the Baltic Sea (Danish and German) and the Black Sea (Turkish) and non-NATO vessels in the Pacific (Japanese, South Korean, etc.), and to defend the Russian mainland against NATO amphibious assault. The missile can perform intensive anti-defense maneuvers with overloads in excess of 10 g, which completed for 9 kilometres (5.6 mi) before the target.

Variants of the missile have been designated 3M80M, 3M82 (Moskit M). The P-270 designation is believed to be the initial product codename for the class of missile, with the Russian Ministry of Defense GRAU indices (starting with 3M) designating the exact variant of the missile. The 3M80 was its original model. The 3M80M model (also termed 3M80E for export) was a 1984 longer range version of the missile, with the latest version with the longest range being the 3M82 Moskit M. The ASM-MSS / Kh-41 variant is the 1993 air-launched version of the missile.

The 3M80MVE variant has an optional longer 240 kilometres (150 mi) range through a second, high-altitude flight profile setting, however using the higher altitude profile would make the missile detectable at much greater distances.

== Specifications ==
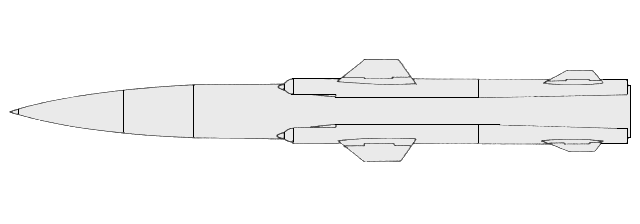
Profile of the missile.

- Launch range:
  - min: 10–12 km (6.2–7.5 mi; 5.4–6.5 nmi)
  - Maximum firing range:

3M80 – 90–120 km (56–75 mi; 49–65 nmi) (surface ship); 250 km (160 mi; 130 nmi) (aircraft)

3M80E – 120 km (75 mi; 65 nmi) (surface ship)

3M80MVE – 140 km (87 mi; 76 nmi) (surface ship, low-altitude trajectory); 240 km (150 mi; 130 nmi) (surface ship, combined trajectory)

- Missile flight speed: 2,800 km/h (1,700 mph; Mach 2.3)
- Missile cruising altitude: 10 – 20 m (low-altitude trajectory), under 7 m for the attack at the target.
- Launch sector relative to ship’s lateral plane, ang.deg: ±60
- Launch readiness time:
  - From missile power-on till first launch: 50 seconds
  - From combat-ready status: 11 seconds
- Inter-missile launch time (in a salvo): 5 seconds
- Launch weight:
  - 3M-80E missile 4,150 kg (9,150 lb)
  - 3M-80E1 missile 3,970 kg (8,750 lb)
- Warhead type: penetrator
- Warhead weight: 300 kg (explosives 150)
- Dimensions:
  - Length: 9.385 m
  - Body diameter: 0.8 m
  - Wing span: 2.1 m
  - Folded wing/empennage span: 1.3 m

== Variants ==
- P-80 Zubr (with missile 3M80) shorter dimensions and range.
- P-270 Moskit (with missile 3M82) longer range and dimensions, maybe faster.
- Kh-41 air launched AGM (air-to-ground missile) or AShM (anti-ship missile).
- P-270MV Coastal Anti-Ship, GLCM (ground launch cruise missile), LACM (land attack cruise missile) variants, SSC-7/12 .
- P-270MVE export version.

== Operators ==
- Russia
  - Russian Navy
- Egypt Used on P-32 Molniya class missile boat
- India
- China
- Vietnam
- North Korea (unknown)

=== Former operators ===
- Soviet Union
