= Kuznetsov NK-8 =

1960s Soviet turbofan aircraft engine

NK-8
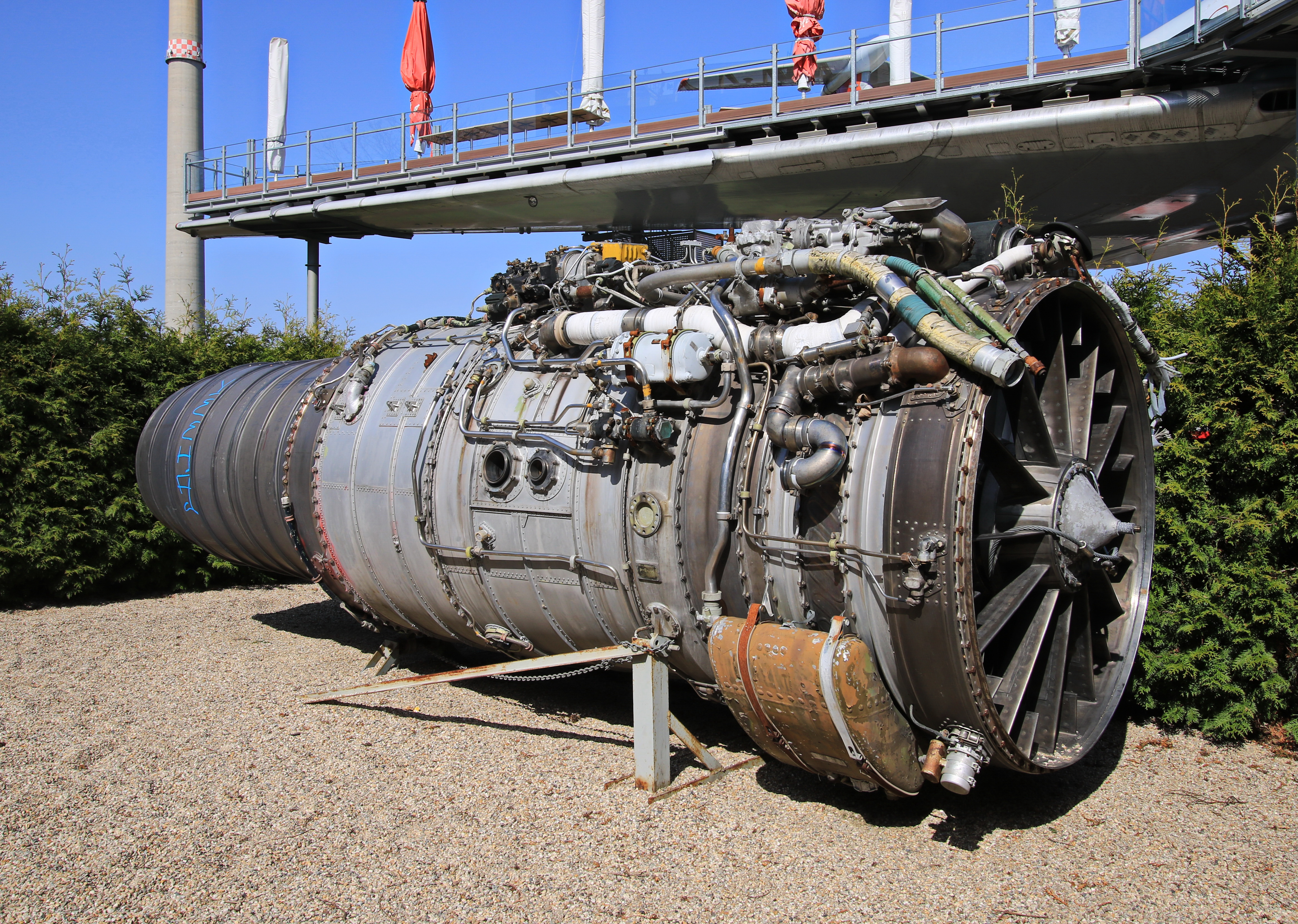
- Type: Turbofan
- National origin: Soviet Union
- Manufacturer: Kuznetsov Design Bureau
- First run: 1961
- Major applications: Ilyushin Il-62; Tupolev Tu-154
- Developed into: Kuznetsov NK-86; Kuznetsov NK-88; Kuznetsov NK-144

The NK-8 was a low-bypass turbofan engine built by the Kuznetsov Design Bureau, in the 90 kN (20,000 lb_{f}) thrust class. It powered production models of the Ilyushin Il-62 and the Tupolev Tu-154A and B models.

== Variants ==
NK-8-2
93.2 kN (20,950 lbf) (Tupolev Tu-154)
NK-8-2U
103.00 kN (23,155 lbf) (Tupolev Tu-154)
NK-8-4
103.0 kN (23,150 lbf) (Ilyushin Il-62)

== Applications ==
- Ilyushin Il-62
- Tupolev Tu-154

== Specifications (NK-8-2) ==
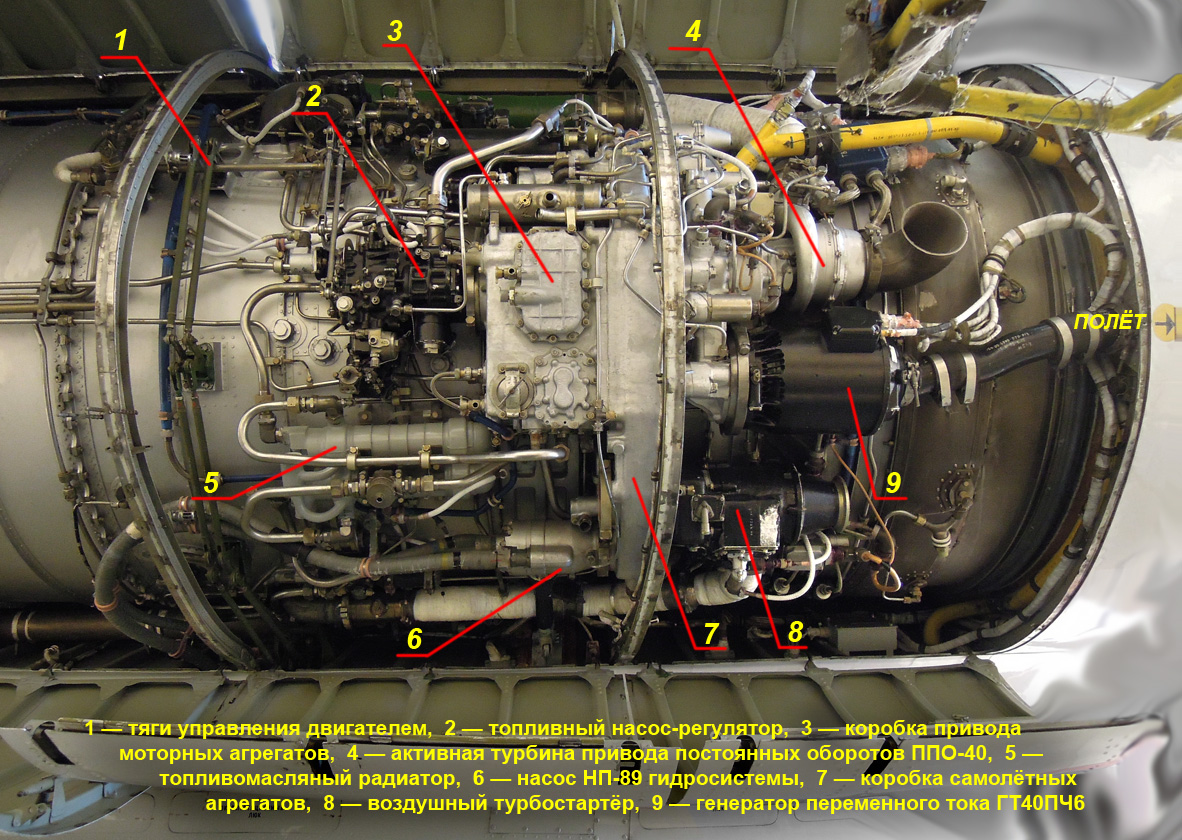
An installed NK-8

Data from Jane's all the World's Aircraft 1982–83.

==== General characteristics ====
- Type: Two-shaft turbofan
- Length: 4,762 mm (187.5 in)
- Diameter: 1,442 mm (56.8 in)
- Dry weight: 2,100 kg (4,600 lb)

==== Components ====
- Compressor: Two stage axial fan, two-stage IP compressor, six-stage HP compressor
- Combustors: Annular (139 burners)
- Turbine: Single-stage HP turbine, two-stage LP turbine
- Fuel type: Avtur
- Oil system: Pressure feed

==== Performance ====
- Maximum thrust: 93.2 kN (21,000 lbf) for take-off
- Overall pressure ratio: 10.8
- Bypass ratio: 1
- Turbine inlet temperature: 1,140 K (870 °C)
- Specific fuel consumption: 0.76 lb/lbf/h (77 kg/kN/h) at 11,000 m (36,000 ft) at cruise power
- Thrust-to-weight ratio: 4.53

== See also ==
Related development

- Kuznetsov NK-86
- Kuznetsov NK-144

Comparable engines

- Pratt & Whitney JT3D
- Pratt & Whitney JT8D
- Rolls-Royce Conway
- Soloviev D-30

Related lists

- List of aircraft engines
