= Alekseyev Central Hydrofoil Design Bureau =

Aviation company based in Nizhniy Novgorod, Russia

- Type: Joint-stock company
- Founded: 1951
- Headquarters: Nizhniy Novgorod, Russia
- Website: www.ckbspk.ru

Alekseyev Central Hydrofoil Design Bureau (Russian: Конструкторское бюро Алексеева) is a company based in Nizhniy Novgorod, Russia. It was named after Rostislav Alexeyev.

This design bureau has been designing hydrofoils, air cushion craft, and air cavity vessels for many years. It designed and manufactured several designs for wing-in-ground-effect vehicles, including the 400-ton Lun-class ekranoplan, 140-ton A-90 Orlyonok, and 20-ton Utka. The company also designed Spasatel and Lun-class ekranoplan.

== Projects ==
=== А-080-752 ===
А-080-752 for a passenger ekranoplan with a maximum takeoff weight of 100 metric tons and a payload of 20 metric tons over 5000 km.

=== А-300-538 ===
А-300-538 for a double decker ekranoplan with a maximum takeoff weight of 350 metric tons and a payload of 64 metric tons or 550 passengers over 3000 km.
