= Spasatel =

Ground-effect vehicle

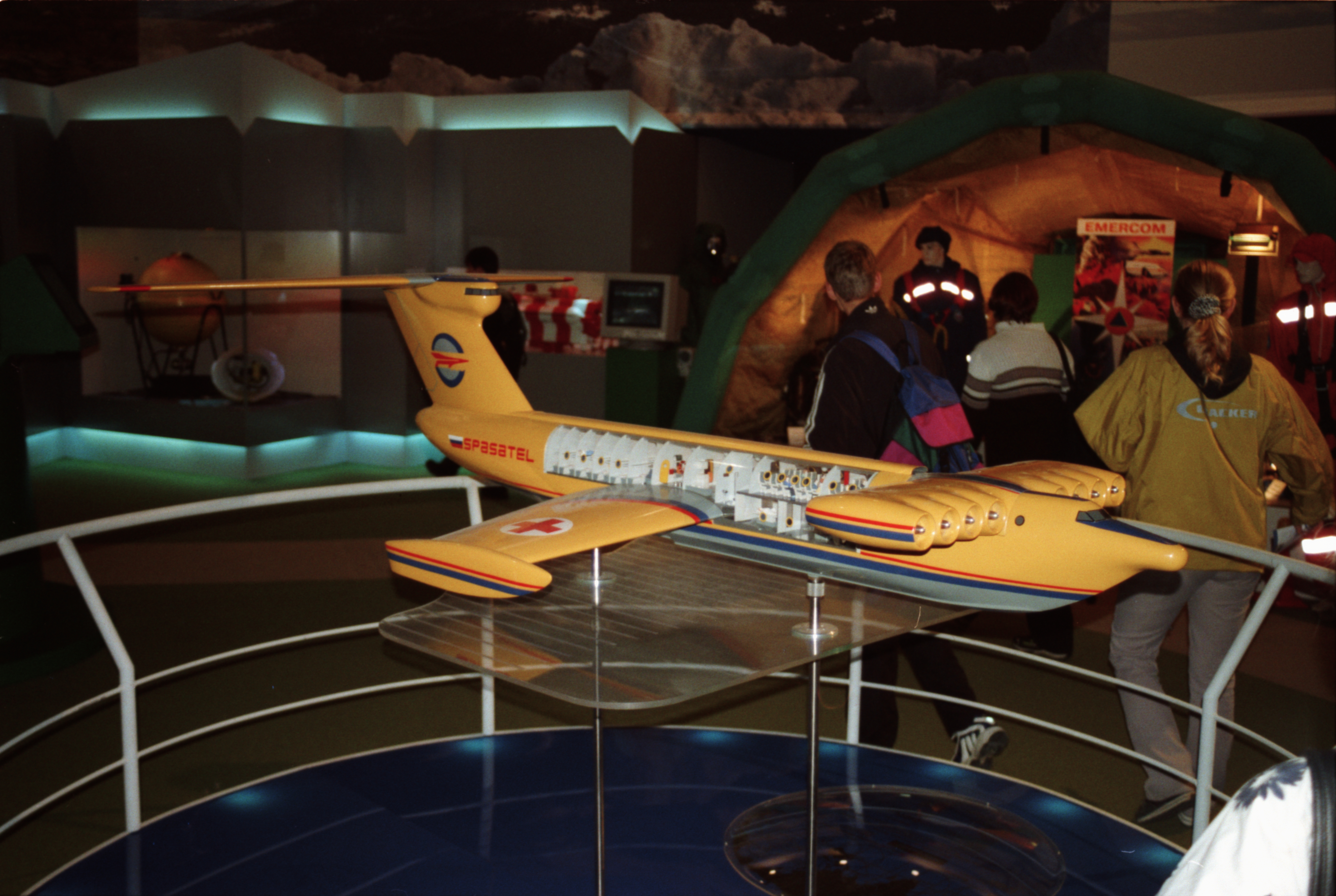
A model of the Spasatel

Spasatel (Russian: Спасатель "Rescuer", "Lifesaver", Project 9038) is a ground-effect vehicle, originally planned by the Soviet Ministry of Defense. The vehicle was intended to serve as the missile carrier of the project Lun-class ekranoplan, but was then converted into an ambulance craft. Following the collapse of the Soviet Union in 1991, construction was halted and the vehicle was never completed.

By 2018, Russia had revived the 600-metric-ton-maximum-takeoff-weight (1,300,000 lb; 600,000 kg) project, with plans to use it for search and rescue operations in the Arctic and Pacific, as well as cargo and troop delivery (up to 550 troops) to remote military bases.

== Goals ==
A military advantage of ground-effect vehicles over ships and submarines was that they did not have draft during operation, and therefore could not be detected by sonar and could not be hit by torpedoes. Advantages over aircraft include operation at low altitude, which makes radar acquisition difficult, and a larger payload. This was particularly interesting during the Cold War as a way to inconspicuously and quickly transport many people or large cargo over long distances.

== History ==
The Spasatel was originally built as a second Lun-class anti-ship missile-carrying ekranoplan. After the Soviet nuclear submarine K-278 Komsomolets sank in 1989, killing 42 people, the Spasatel was repurposed to be deployed in the maritime search and rescue mission, and seating for up to 500 passengers was planned.

After the disintegration of the Soviet Union, the project was cancelled for financial reasons. Military operations at sea were also greatly reduced, so the intended use became less important. The unfinished Spasatel is stored in an old industrial complex in Nizhny Novgorod as of 2020.

=== Potential resumption ===
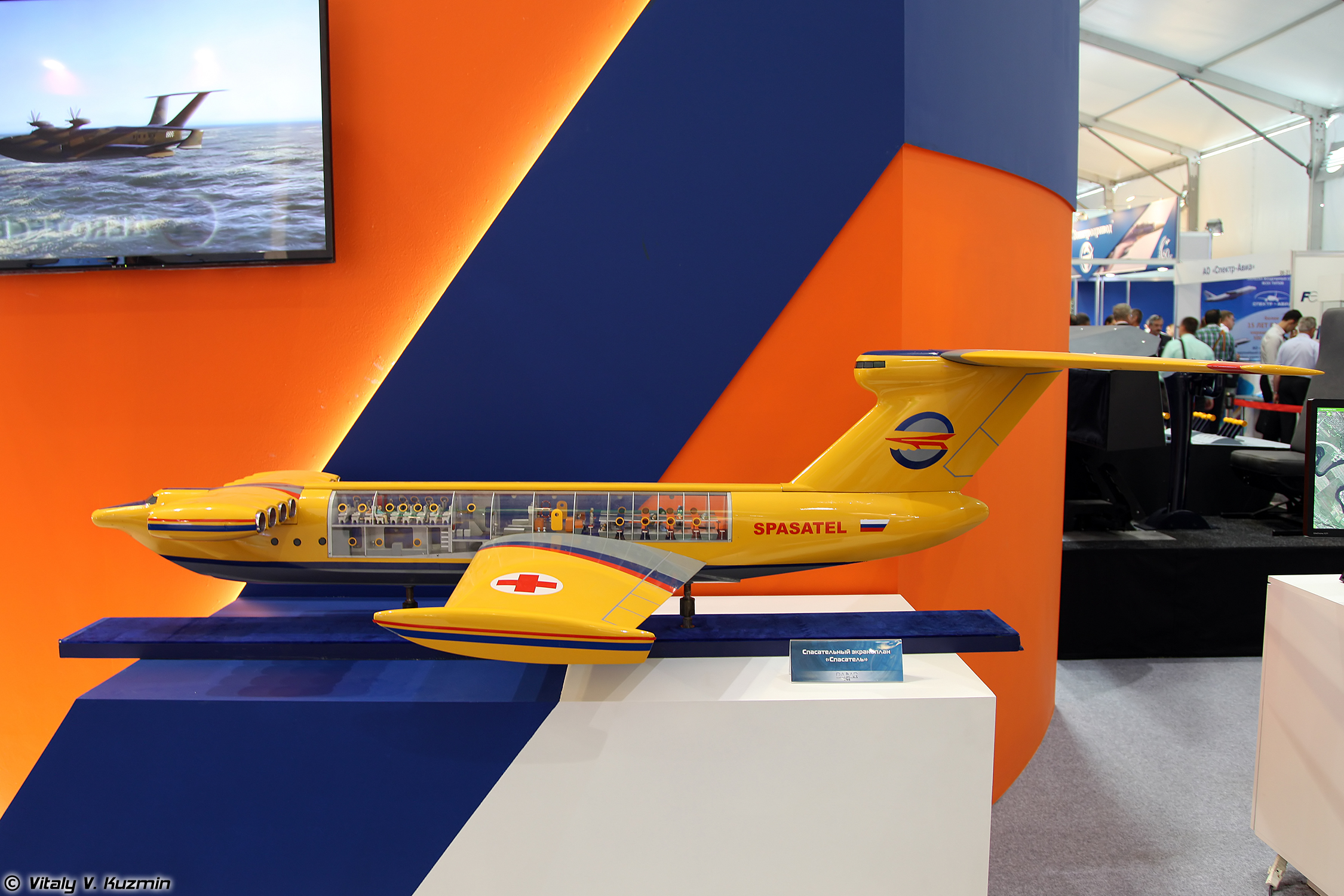
Model presented in 2015

According to press reports in December 2017, the development of the Spasatel might be resumed, for use mainly in Arctic waters, with production beginning as early as 2025. According to Russian media, as of November 2017, the project was included in the arms budget for the years 2018 to 2025.

== See also ==
- Lun-class ekranoplan (military variant, basis of Spasatel)
- TTS-IS
