= Lun-class ekranoplan =

Soviet ground effect vehicle

Coordinates: 41°56′25″N 48°22′43″E

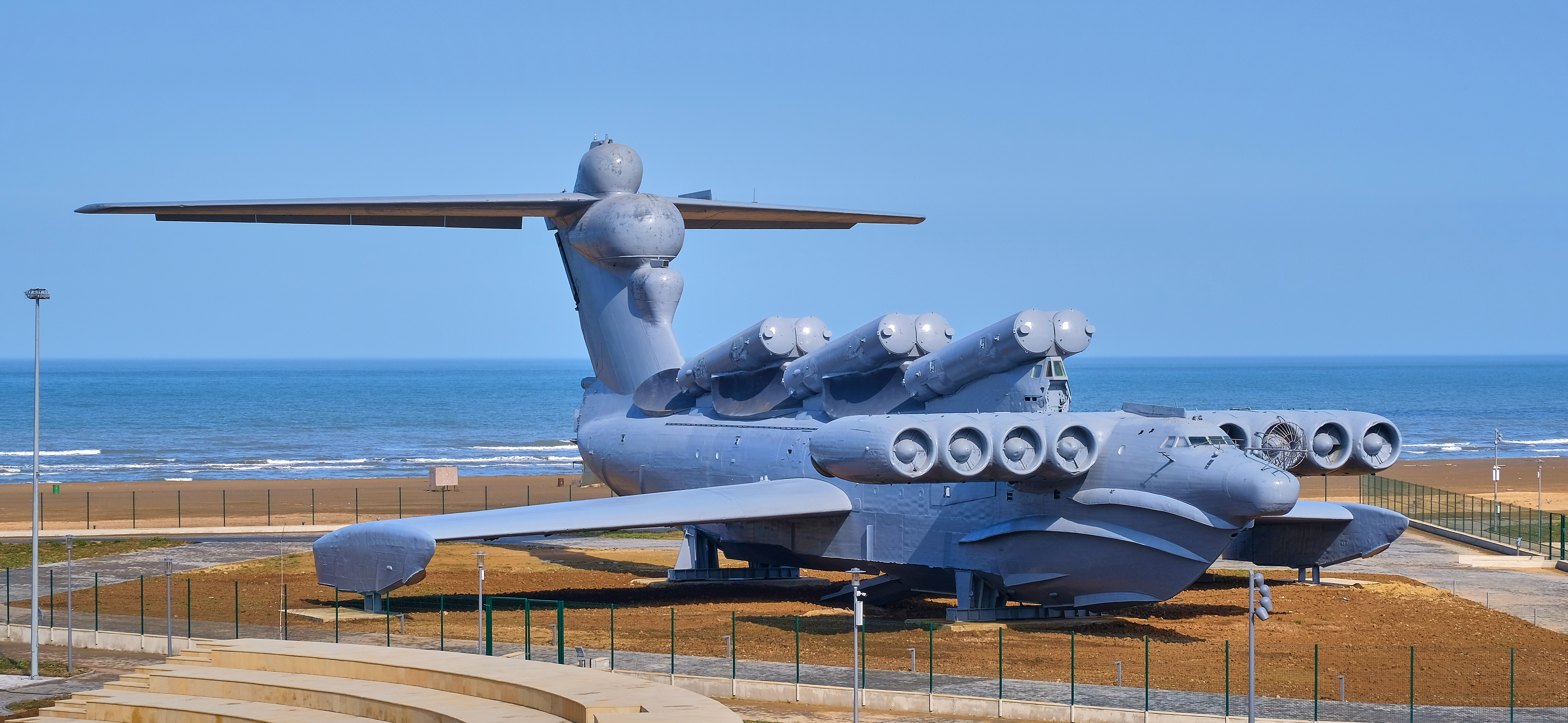
- Lun-class ekranoplan MD-160 at Patriot Park, Derbent

Class overview
- Name: Lun
- Operators: Soviet Navy; Russian Navy
- In service: 1987–late 1990s
- Planned: 2
- Completed: 1
- Canceled: 1
- Retired: 1
- Preserved: 1

General characteristics
- Type: Attack/transport ground effect vehicle
- Displacement: Displacement n/a, weight 286 tonnes unloaded
- Length: 73.8 m (242 ft 2 in)
- Beam: (Wingspan) 44 m (144 ft 4 in)
- Height: 19.2 m (63 ft 0 in)
- Draught: (2.5 m (8 ft 2 in)
- Propulsion: 8 × Kuznetsov NK-87 turbofan engines, 127.4 kN (28,600 lbf) thrust
- Speed: 297 knots (550 km/h; 342 mph)
- Range: 1,000 nmi (1,900 km; 1,200 mi)
- Capacity: 100 tonnes (220,000 pounds)
- Complement: six officers and nine enlisted men
- Sensors & processing systems: Puluchas search radar
- Armament: 6 × fixed-elevation P-270 Moskit anti-ship missile launchers; 2 × twin 23 mm PI-23 turrets

The Lun-class ekranoplan (Soviet classification: Project 903) is the only ground effect vehicle (GEV) to ever be operationally deployed as a warship, deploying in the Caspian Flotilla. It was designed by Rostislav Alexeyev in 1975 and used by the Soviet and later Russian navies from 1987 until sometime in the late 1990s.

It flew using lift generated by the ground effect acting on its large wings when within about four metres (13 ft) above the surface of the water. Although they might look similar to traditional aircraft, ekranoplans like the Lun are not classified as aircraft, seaplanes, hovercraft, or hydrofoils. Rather, craft like the Lun-class ekranoplan are classified as maritime ships by the International Maritime Organization due to their use of the ground effect, in which the craft glides just above the surface of the water.

The ground effect occurs when flying at an altitude of only a few metres above the ocean or ground; drag is greatly reduced by the proximity of the ground preventing the formation of wingtip vortices, thus increasing the efficiency of the wing. This effect does not occur at high altitude.

The name Lun comes from the Russian word for the harrier.

== Design and development ==
The Lun-class ekranoplan was developed on the basis of the experimental KM ekranoplan, which was nicknamed the "Caspian Sea Monster".

The Lun was powered by eight Kuznetsov NK-87 turbofans mounted on forward canards, each producing 127.4 kN (28,600 lbf) of thrust. It had a flying boat hull with a large deflecting plate at the bottom to provide a "step" for takeoff. It had a maximum cruising speed of 550 kilometres per hour (340 mph).

Equipped for anti-surface warfare, it carried the P-270 Moskit (Mosquito) guided missile. Six missile launchers were mounted in pairs on the dorsal surface of its fuselage with advanced tracking systems mounted in its nose and tail.

The only model of this class ever built to completion, the MD-160, entered service with the Soviet Navy Caspian Flotilla in 1987. It was retired in the late 1990s and sat unused at a Caspian Sea naval base in Kaspiysk until 2020.

The second Lun-class ekranoplan was partially built in the late 1980s. While its construction was underway, it was redesigned as a mobile field hospital for rapid deployment to any ocean or coastal location. It was named the Spasatel ("Rescuer"). Following the collapse of the Soviet Union in 1991 and cancellation of military funding, construction of the second craft was halted. As of 2021, the uncompleted Spasatel is stored adjacent to the Volga river in an old industrial complex within the central Russian city of Nizhny Novgorod.

The Lun design had several drawbacks. One was that although the ground effect enabled it to fly at low altitude, in order to utilize the effect it had to fly as low as 1.5–3.0 m (5–10 ft) off the water due to its short wingspan, so it could not fly when seas were even mildly rough. Another was that the craft was only designed to use the ground effect principle, so it could not ascend to higher cruising altitudes. The requirement for calm seas to operate, and the inability to fly above them if they were not, greatly limited where it was able to deploy.

== Museum ship ==
On 31 July 2020, the completed MD-160 Lun-class ekranoplan was towed out of the naval base in Kaspiysk, with the intention of being eventually put on public display in Derbent, Dagestan, at the planned Patriot Park, a combination museum and theme park that will display Soviet and Russian military equipment. The towing operation involved the use of rubber pontoons, three tugboats and two escort vessels, and would have covered approximately 100 km (62 miles) had it been completed. However, during the tow the ekranoplan became stuck just offshore of a sandy beach, short of the intended destination.

The team managing the towing operation was unable to free the massive vehicle, so the ekranoplan was secured and remained beached in the surf zone while plans were drawn up on how to continue the move to Patriot Park. In the meantime, the unusual craft began attracting attention from the media, onlookers, and trespassing "urban explorers", even before the park was built. One report published in August 2020 stated that the hull, exposed to the waves in the surf zone, was taking on water. Moving the craft to dry land beyond the surf zone would eliminate the possibility that increased wave action during storms could damage the hull further.

In December 2020 a successful recovery operation resulted in the ekranoplan being hauled out of the water, nose-first, with the tail ending up about 20–30 m (65–100 ft) from the sea, as seen from satellite imagery. The ekranoplan was towed ashore on 30 December 2021. During transport, and subsequent haul up the beach, MD-160 suffered damage to its wing sponsons and fuselage.

In December 2024, Russian sources reported that MD-160 would be restored.

In September 2025, it was announced that exterior and partial interior restoration of MD-160 was underway, aiming to return the craft to its original appearance and transformation into a museum exhibit. This would also involve a partial repair of the damage to the vehicles flaps during its transport from Kaspiysk. Paint work was largely complete by mid October 2025, with MD-160 repainted in a grey colour scheme. The vehicle will be the central exhibit for the new Derbent Patriot Park, located in a new tourist cluster on the Caspian Sea, located south of the city.

== Gallery ==
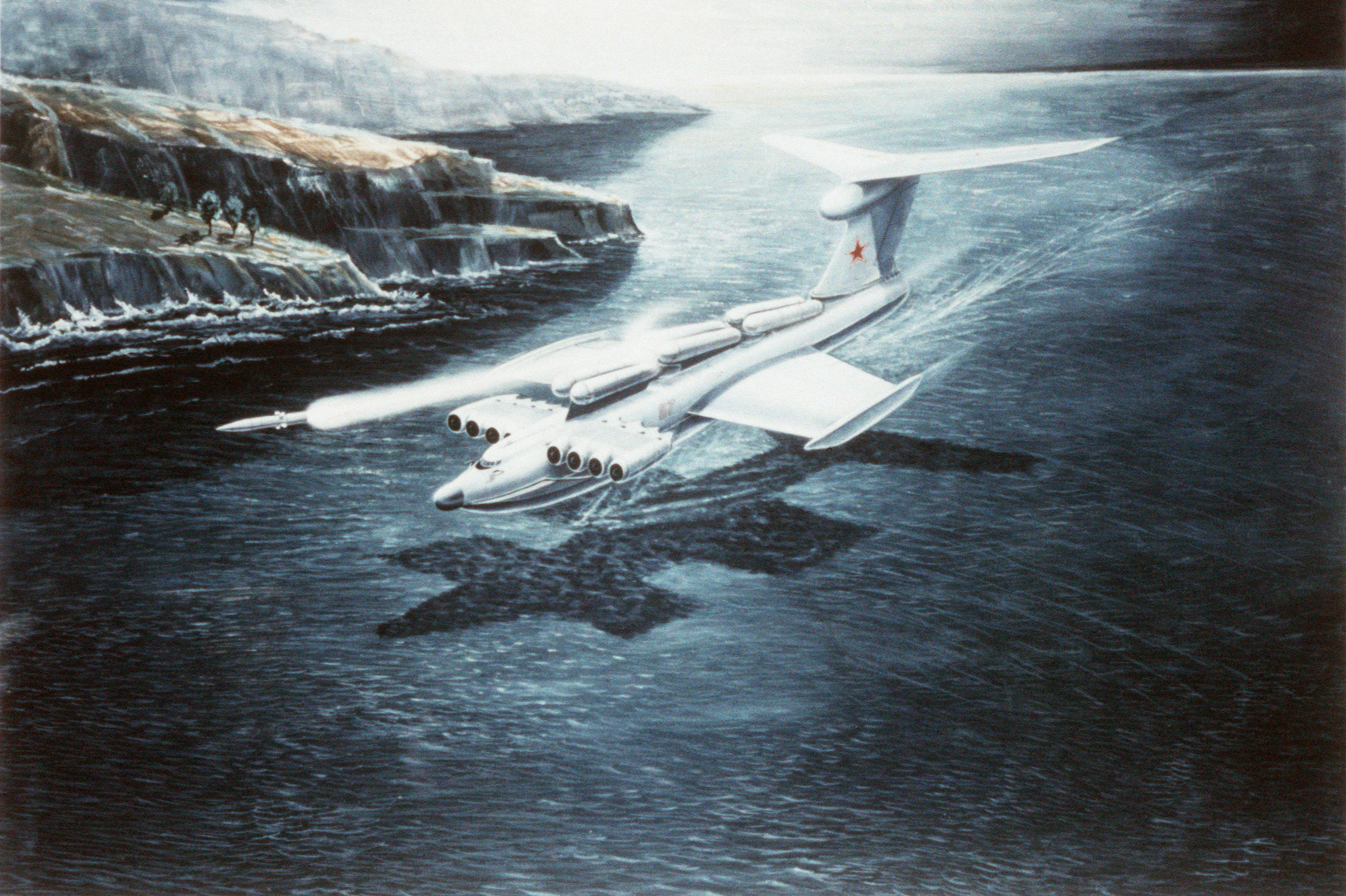
Artist's concept of a Lun-class ekranoplan in flight.

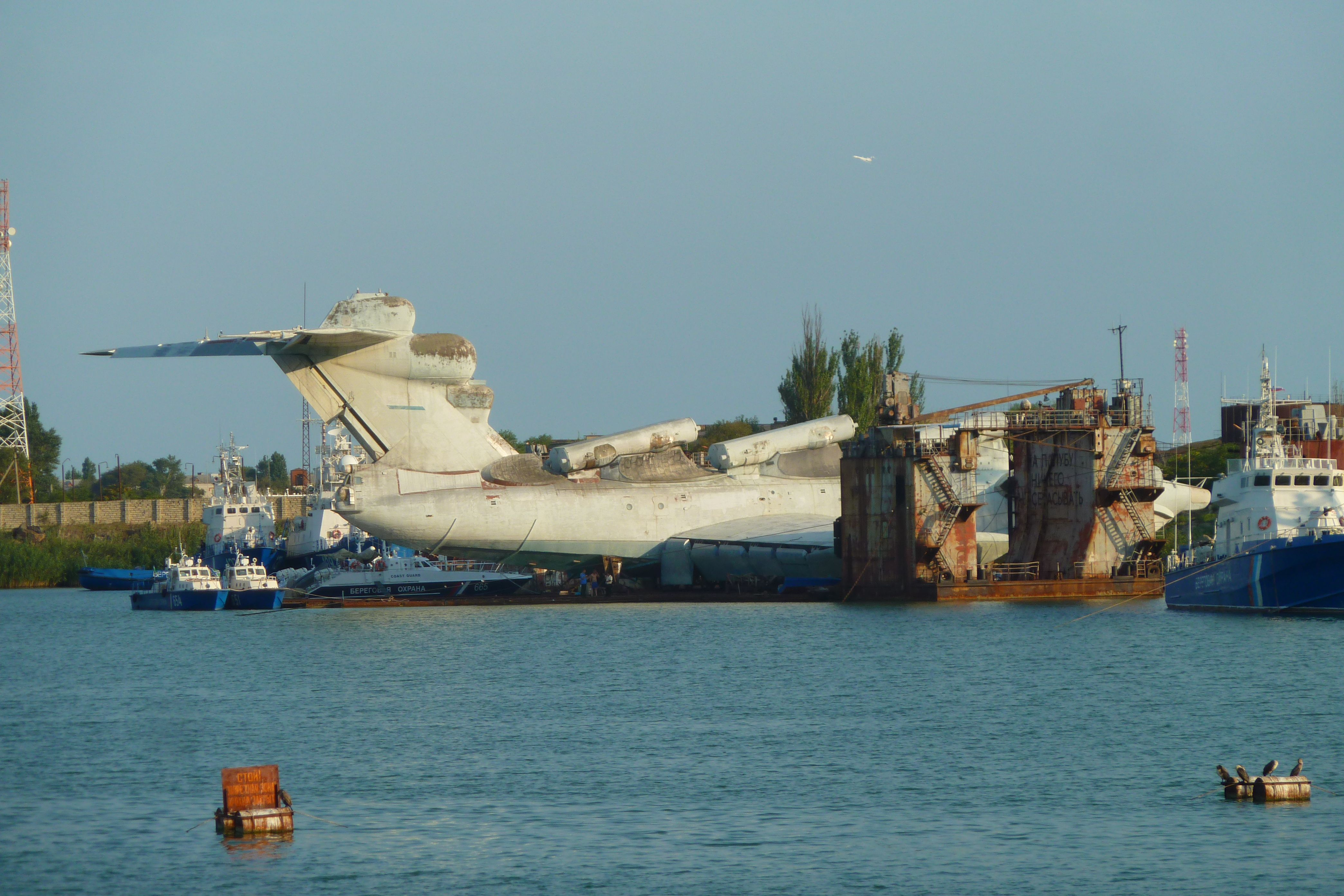
Lun class at Kaspiysk, Russia, in 2010.

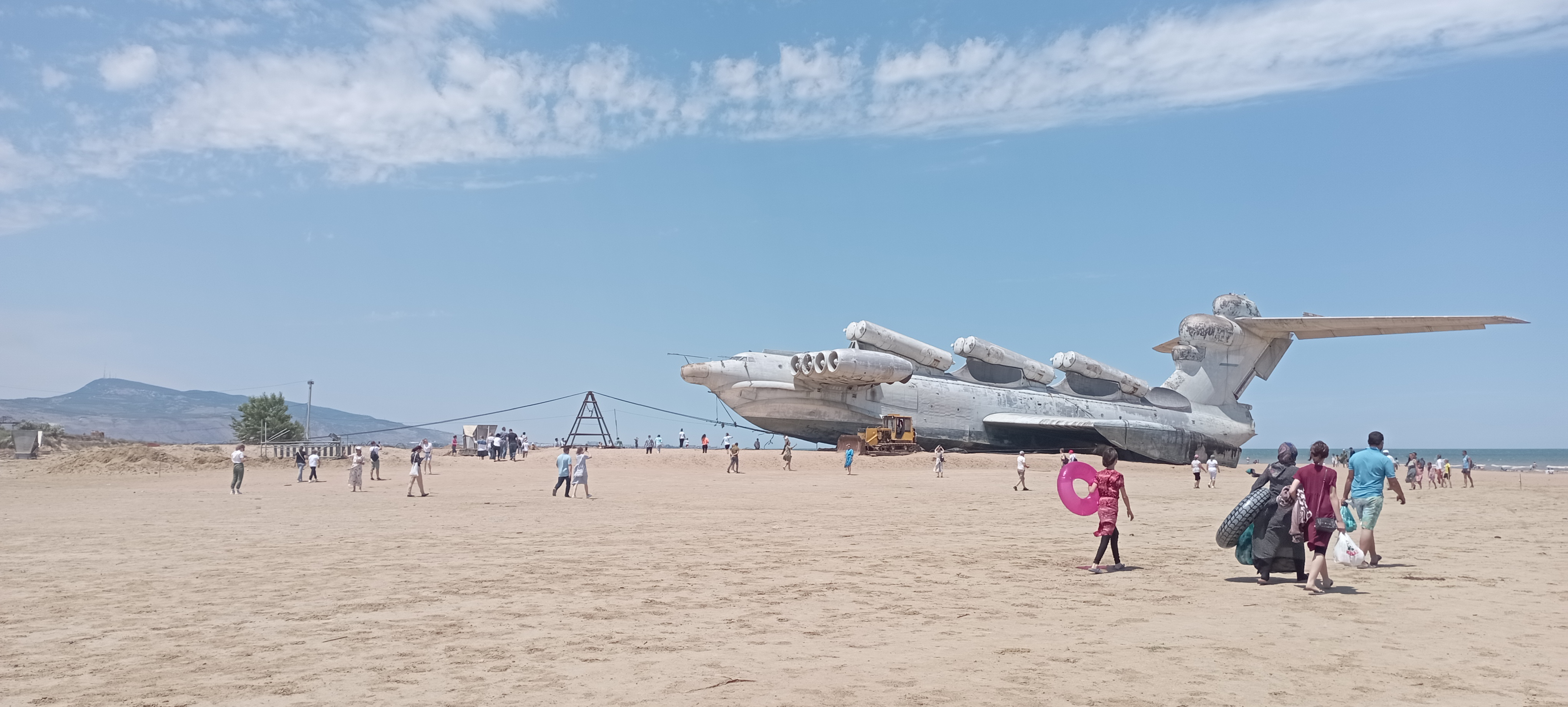
MD-160 being hauled up the beach, prior to the development of Derbent Patriot Park and subsequent restoration.

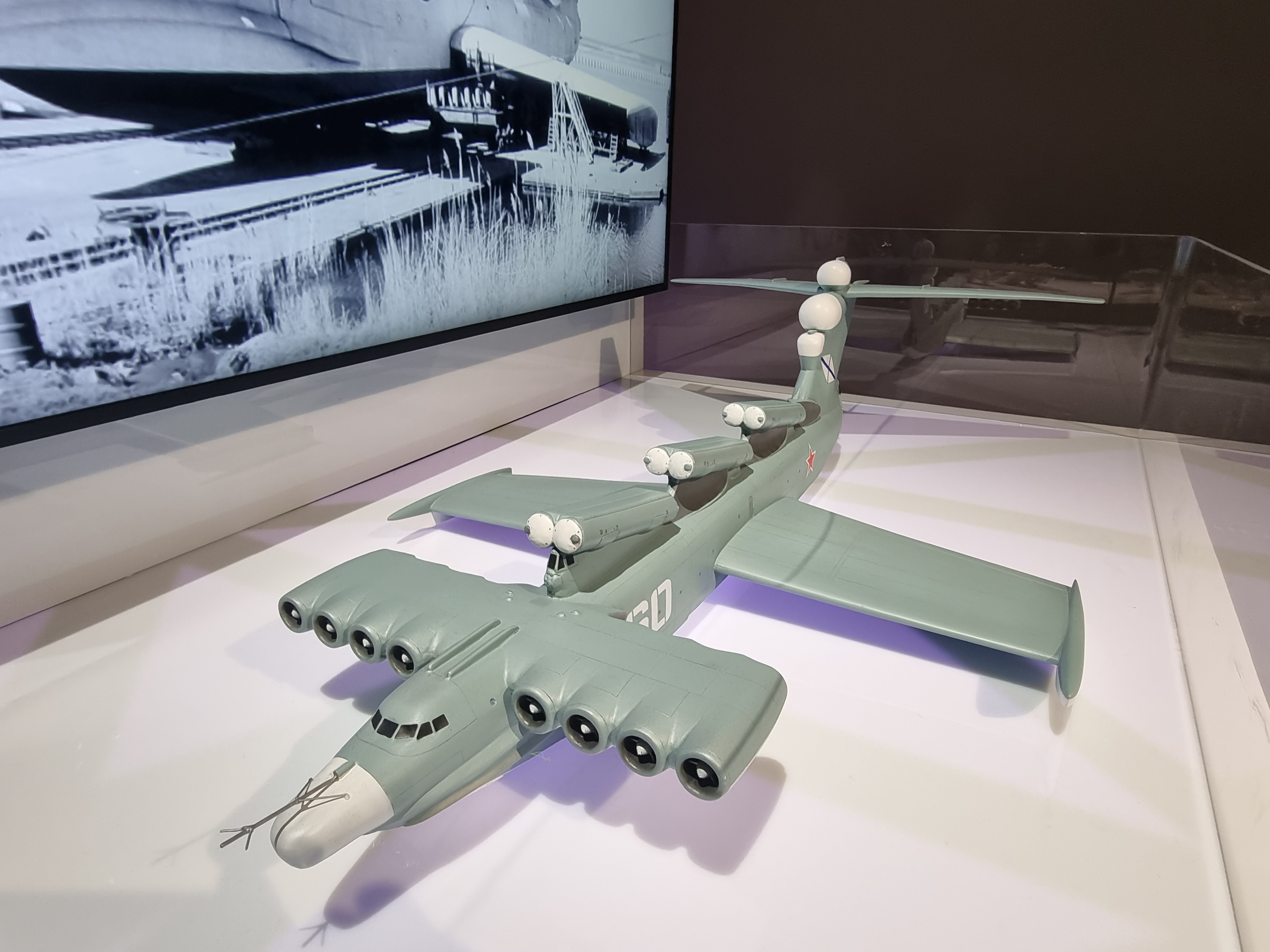
Scale model of a Lun-class ekranoplan displayed in a museum

== Specifications ==
Data from

General characteristics

- Crew: 15 (6 officers, 9 enlisted)
- Capacity: 137 t (302,000 lb)
- Length: 73.8 m (242 ft 2 in)
- Wingspan: 44 m (144 ft 4 in)
- Height: 19.2 m (63 ft 0 in)
- Wing area: 550 m^{2} (5,900 sq ft)
- Empty weight: 286,000 kg (630,522 lb)
- Max takeoff weight: 380,000 kg (837,757 lb)
- Powerplant: 8 × Kuznetsov NK-87 turbofans, 127.4 kN (28,600 lbf) thrust each

Performance

- Maximum speed: 550 km/h (340 mph, 300 kn)
- Cruise speed: 450 km/h (280 mph, 240 kn) at 2.5 m (8 ft)
- Range: 2,000 km (1,200 mi, 1,100 nmi)
- Service ceiling: 5 m (16 ft) in ground effect

Armament

- Guns: two 23mm Pl-23 cannon in a twin tail turret and two 23mm Pl-23 cannon in a twin turret under forward missile tubes
- Missiles: six launchers for P-270 Moskit Sunburn anti-ship missiles

== Related development ==
- Caspian Sea Monster (KM)
- Spasatel
- A-050
- А-300-538
