= 2839 Annette =

Flora family asteroid

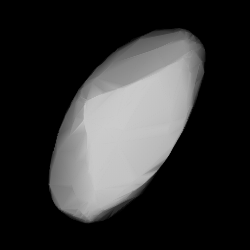
- Shape model of Annette from its lightcurve

Discovery
- Discovered by: C. W. Tombaugh
- Discovery site: Lowell Obs.
- Discovery date: 5 October 1929

Designations
- Named after: Annette Tombaugh (discoverer's daughter)
- Alternative designations: 1929 TP · 1937 AB_{1} 1939 UL · 1962 TE; 1970 BB · 1972 XF_{1} 1982 VP
- Minor planet category: main-belt · Flora

Orbital characteristics
- Epoch 4 September 2017 (JD 2458000.5)
- Uncertainty parameter 0
- Observation arc: 87.67 yr (32,023 days)
- Aphelion: 2.5493 AU
- Perihelion: 1.8838 AU
- Semi-major axis: 2.2166 AU
- Eccentricity: 0.1501
- Orbital period (sidereal): 3.30 yr (1,205 days)
- Mean anomaly: 200.55°
- Mean motion: 0° 17^{m} 55.32^{s} / day
- Inclination: 4.8085°
- Longitude of ascending node: 44.569°
- Argument of perihelion: 6.8264°

Physical characteristics
- Mean diameter: 5.41±0.86 km 7.313±0.150 km 7.562±0.122 km
- Synodic rotation period: 10.457±0.003 h 10.4595±0.0001 h
- Geometric albedo: 0.0563±0.0118; 0.060±0.005; 0.24 (assumed); 0.47±0.22
- Spectral type: S
- Absolute magnitude (H): 12.9 · 12.92 · 14.35

2839 Annette (prov. designation: 1929 TP) is a bright Flora asteroid from the inner regions of the asteroid belt. It was discovered on 5 October 1929, by American astronomer Clyde Tombaugh at Lowell Observatory during his search for Pluto. The presumed S-type asteroid has a rotation period of 10.5 hours and measures approximately five kilometers (three miles) in diameter. It was named after the discoverer's daughter.

== Orbit and classification ==
Annette is a S-type asteroid and member of the Flora family, one of the largest families of stony asteroids. It orbits the Sun in the inner main-belt at a distance of 1.9–2.5 AU once every 3 years and 4 months (1,205 days). Its orbit has an eccentricity of 0.15 and an inclination of 5° with respect to the ecliptic. Due to a precovery taken at Lowell Observatory, the body's observation arc was extended by 4 days prior to its official discovery observation.

== Naming ==
This minor planet was named after Clyde Tombaugh's daughter, Annette. The approved naming citation was published by the Minor Planet Center on 22 June 1986 (M.P.C. 10845).

== Physical characteristics ==
=== Rotation period ===
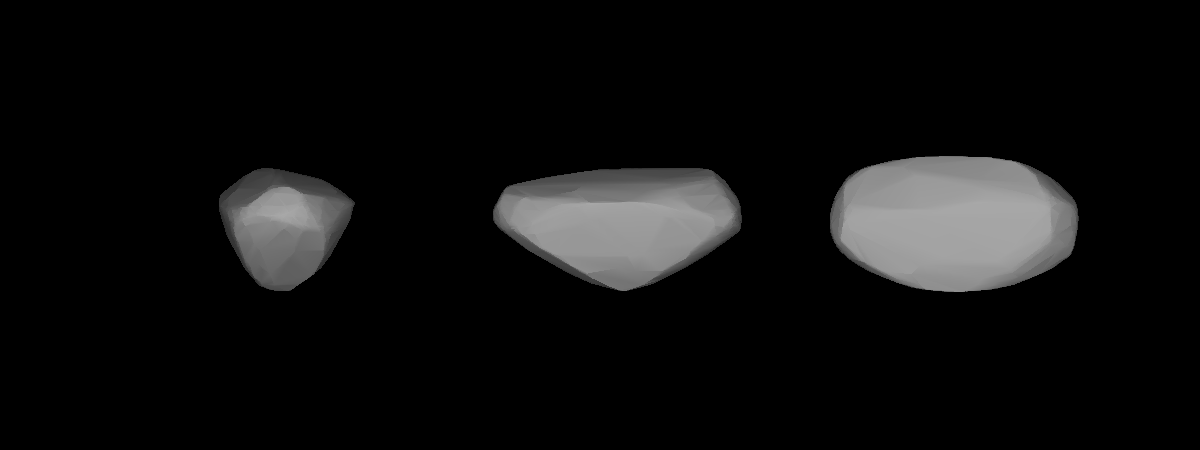
Lightcurve-based 3D-model of Annette

The first rotational lightcurve of Annette was obtained by American astronomer Brian Warner at his Palmer Divide Observatory, Colorado, in December 2005. It gave a rotation period of 10.457 hours with a brightness variation of 0.92 magnitude (U=3-). In November 2006, a second lightcurve by astronomer Robert Buchheim at Altimira Observatory in southern California gave a concurring period of 10.4595 hours and an amplitude of 0.64 magnitude (U=3). He also noted a significantly fainter absolute magnitude of 14.35 than previously reported.

=== Diameter and albedo ===
According to the survey carried out by NASA's Wide-field Infrared Survey Explorer with its subsequent NEOWISE mission, Annette measures between 5.41 and 7.562 kilometers in diameter and its surface has an albedo between 0.056 and 0.47, while the Collaborative Asteroid Lightcurve Link assumes an albedo of 0.24 – derived from 8 Flora, the largest member and namesake of its family – and calculates a diameter of 3.66 kilometers using Robert Buchheim's fainter absolute magnitude of 14.35.
