= Elizabeth Langdon Williams =

American human computer and astronomer (1879–1981)

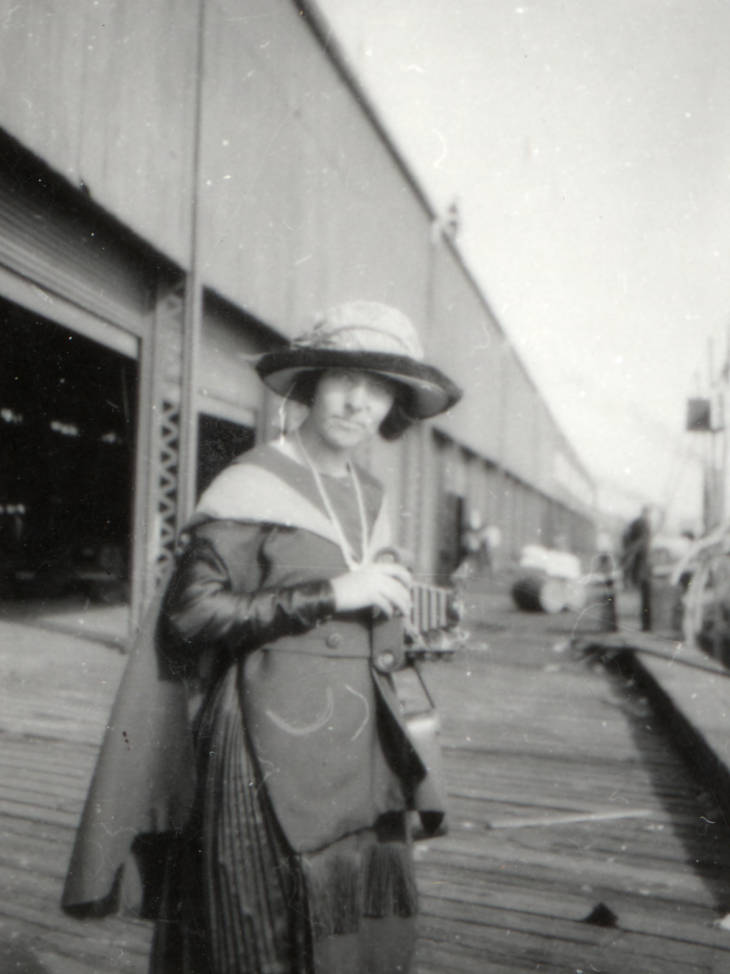
- Born: 8 February 1879; Putnam, Connecticut, United States
- Died: 1981 (aged 101–102); Enfield, New Hampshire, United States
- Other name: Elizabeth Williams
- Education: Massachusetts Institute of Technology
- Known for: Calculations to predict existence and location of Pluto
- Spouse: George Hamilton (m. 1922; died 1935)
- Scientific career
- Fields: Mathematics, Astronomy, Physics
- Workplaces: Lowell Observatory, US; Mandeville observatory, Jamaica
- Thesis: An analytical study of the Fresnel wave-surface (1903)

Elizabeth Langdon Williams (February 8, 1879 – 1981) was an American human computer and astronomer whose work involving the search for Planet X helped lead to the discovery of Pluto.

== Personal life and education ==
Elizabeth Langdon Williams was born to Elizabeth Brigham and Louis M. Williams on February 8, 1879 in Putnam, Connecticut. She was the twin of Robert Longfellow Williams, and the older sister of Henry Trumbell Williams and Ursula Louise Williams. She graduated from MIT with a degree in physics in 1903 as one of their earliest female graduates, and was the first woman to play an honor part during graduation. She read part of her thesis, "An analytical study of the Fresnel wave-surface" at the ceremony, and was said to have widely impressed all in attendance. She was at the top of her class and said to be ambidextrous, writing cursive with her right hand and print with her left hand. In 1922, Williams married George Hall Hamilton, another astronomer who was born in London on June 30, 1884 and educated at Cambridge. He worked at the Lowell Observatory in Flagstaff, Arizona, where he met Williams, from 1917 to 1922.

== Career ==
Williams was hired by Percival Lowell in 1905 to work from his State Street office in Boston. She initially edited publications for Lowell until she was asked to be a human computer for his Planet X research that began in 1910.

=== Planet X ===
Lowell hypothesized that a proposed Planet X affected the orbits of the known planets Neptune and Uranus. Williams' role in the Planet X project was that of head human computer, performing mathematical calculations on where Lowell should search for an unknown object and its size based on the differences in the orbits of Neptune and Uranus. Her calculations led to predictions for the location of the unknown planet, but Lowell died in 1916 and the project was discontinued. In the late 1920s, however, the project was resumed and Clyde Tombaugh was hired to lead it. Tombaugh used Lowell's predictions (built on Williams' calculations) to locate an image in a region of the sky photographed in 1915 that he identified as a new planet named Pluto in 1930.

Williams continued to work on calculations and handled correspondence at Lowell Observatory after Lowell's death, moving from Boston to the observatory itself at Flagstaff in 1919. She and Hamilton were then dismissed from their positions at the observatory by Percival Lowell's widow, Constance, because it was considered inappropriate to employ a married woman. Williams and her husband were subsequently employed at an observatory in Mandeville, Jamaica run by Harvard College Observatory where they worked together.

== Final years ==
In 1935, George Hall Hamilton died. Widowed, Williams retired from the observatory in Mandeville and moved to Lebanon, New Hampshire with her younger sister, Louise Ring, where they ran "Peaceful Acres," a summer retreat home. She died in 1981 in Enfield, New Hampshire at the age of 101.
