= Clyde Tombaugh =

American astronomer (1906–1997)

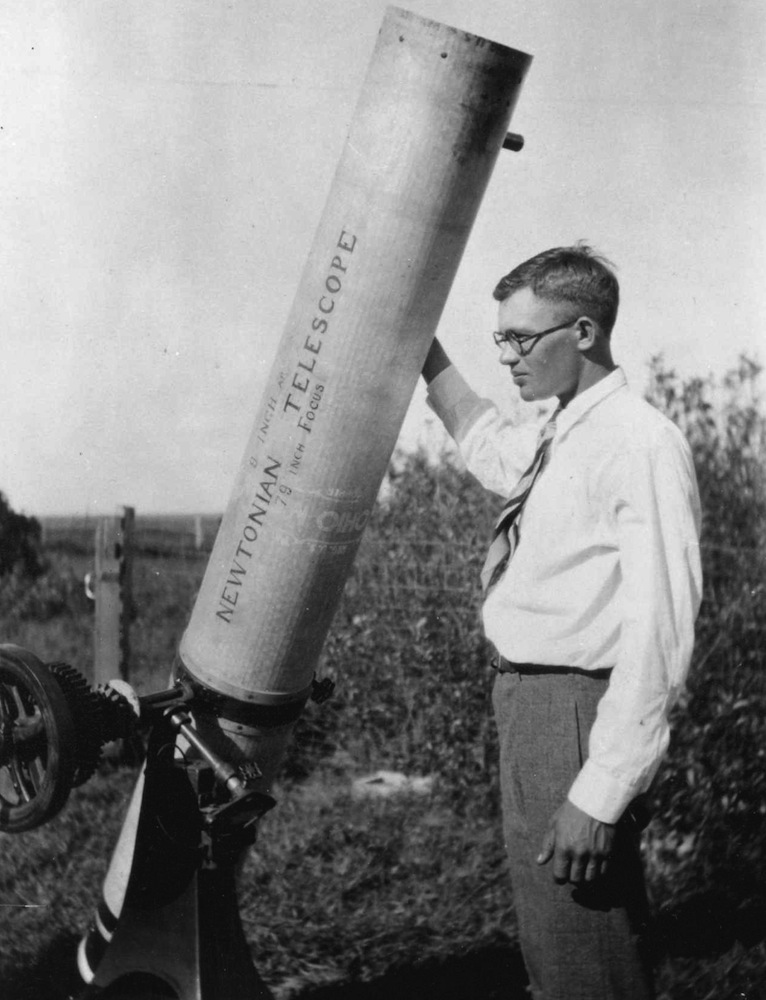
- Tombaugh in 1930 at his family's farm with his homemade telescope
- Born: Clyde William Tombaugh; February 4, 1906; Streator, Illinois, U.S.
- Died: January 17, 1997 (aged 90); Las Cruces, New Mexico, U.S.
- Education: University of Kansas
- Occupation: Astronomer
- Known for: Discovery of Pluto
- Spouse: Patricia Edson (m. 1934)
- Children: 2
- Relatives: Clayton Kershaw (great-nephew)
- Awards: Jackson-Gwilt Medal (1931); New Mexico State University Board of Regents Medal (1980); Rittenhouse Medal (1990)

Clyde William Tombaugh (/ˈtɒmbaʊ/; February 4, 1906 – January 17, 1997) was an American astronomer and telescope maker, best known for discovering Pluto in 1930, marking the first detection of what would eventually be recognized as the Kuiper belt. At the time, Pluto was referred to as the ninth planet in the Solar System, a classification that stood for over seven decades.

Born in Illinois, and raised on farms in Kansas, Tombaugh was largely self-taught in astronomy and optical engineering, building his own telescopes from spare parts and grinding lenses by hand. His skill and determination led to a position at Lowell Observatory in Flagstaff, Arizona, where he conducted photographic surveys of the night sky. In addition to Pluto, Tombaugh identified hundreds of asteroids and a variety of star clusters, galaxies, and variable stars, thereby contributing significantly to the cataloguing of the night sky.

As a professor at New Mexico State University, he led the Planetary Patrol project, which helped determine Mercury's rotation period, monitored Jupiter's Great Red Spot, and developed new photographic techniques for satellite searches. After retiring in 1973, Tombaugh continued to construct telescopes, support observational programs, and advocated continued study of unidentified flying objects (UFOs).

== Early life ==
Tombaugh was born in Streator, Illinois, son of Muron Dealvo Tombaugh, a farmer of Pennsylvania Dutch descent, and his wife Adella Pearl Chritton on February 4, 1906. He was the first of six children in the family with his sister, Esther being born 2 1/2 years after Clyde followed by his brother Roy in 1912, Charles in 1914, Robert in 1923 and Anita Rachel in 1929. Tombaugh's interest in astronomy appears to have begun when he visited the Yerkes Observatory in Lake Geneva, Wisconsin when he was 12 years old in 1918. His uncle Lee also helped spark his interest in astronomy as he was an amateur astronomer who used a 3-inch (76 mm) diameter non-achromatic refractor telescope and gave him several astronomy-related books.

The family's poor finances, due to years of bad weather on the farm and a bad corn harvest in 1921, caused them to move to a new farm in Burdett, Kansas in 1922. As the family had moved to the farm in August 1922 and the crops needed to be prepared urgently, Tombaugh had to drop out of high school for a year to help his father prepare the crops on the family farm. Tombaugh graduated from high school in 1925. Tombaugh's plans for attending college were frustrated when a hailstorm in June 1928 ruined his family's farm crops. Tombaugh read an article in Popular Astronomy in 1924 by an amateur astronomer named Latimer J. Wilson, titled "The Drift of Jupiter's Markings" showing sketches of Jupiter and decided he wanted to make his own telescope so he could see the features shown on Jupiter in sketches.

== Astronomy career ==
Beginning in 1926, he built several telescopes with lenses and mirrors by himself. To better test his telescope mirrors, Tombaugh, with just a pick and shovel, dug a pit 24 feet long, 8 feet deep, and 7 feet wide. This provided a constant air temperature, free of air currents, and was also used by the family as a root cellar and emergency shelter. He sent drawings of Jupiter and Mars to the Lowell Observatory, at Flagstaff, Arizona, which offered him a job. Tombaugh worked there from 1929 to 1945.

=== Pluto ===
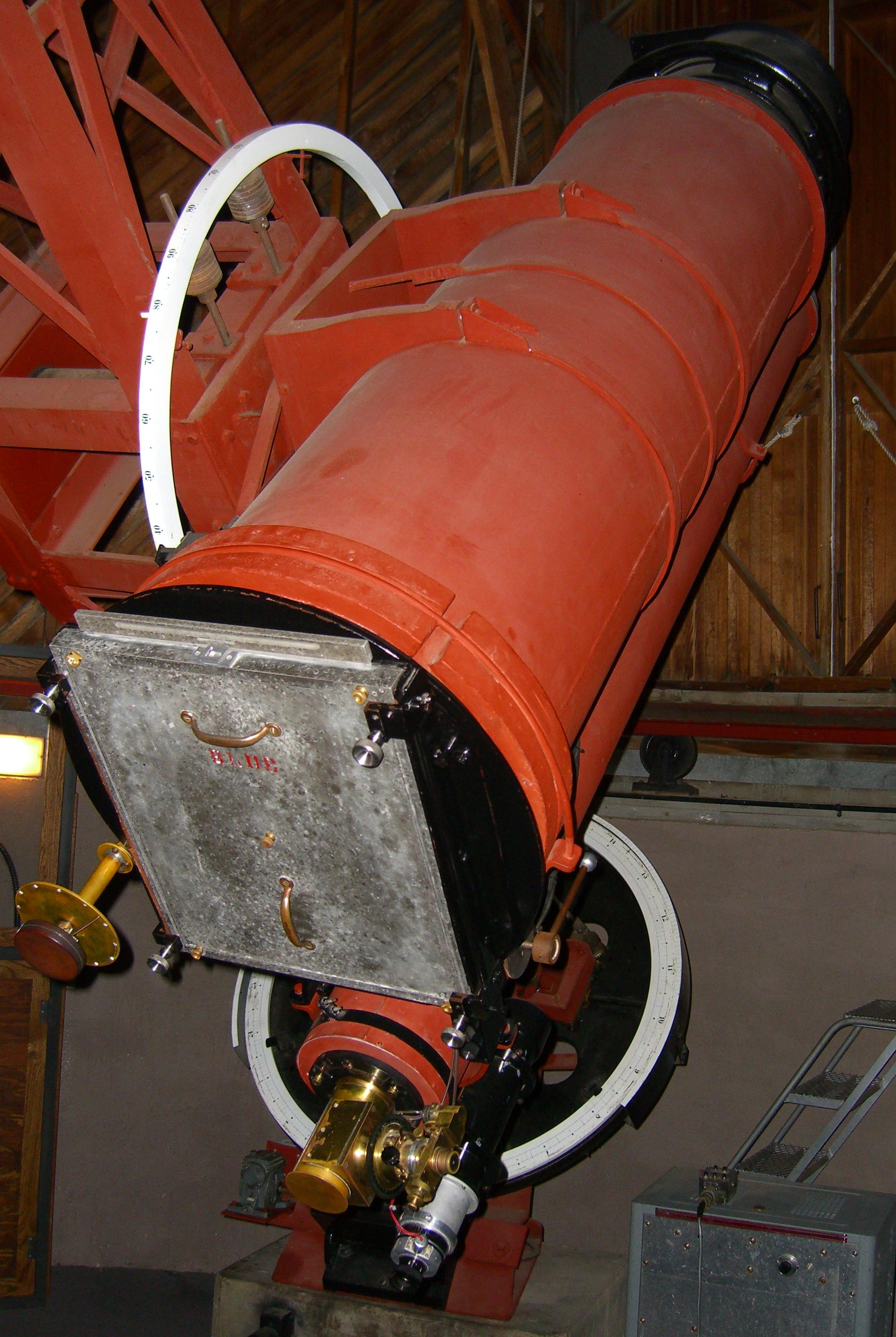
Tombaugh created his photographic plates using this 13-inch (330 mm) astrograph.

It was at Lowell in 1930 that Tombaugh discovered Pluto. Following his discovery, Tombaugh earned bachelor's and master's degrees in astronomy from the University of Kansas in 1936 and 1938. While a young researcher working for the Lowell Observatory in Flagstaff, Arizona, Tombaugh was given the job to perform a systematic search for a trans-Neptunian planet (also called Planet X), which had been predicted by Percival Lowell based on calculations performed by his student mathematician Elizabeth Williams and William Pickering.

Starting April 6, 1929, Tombaugh used the observatory's 13-inch (330 mm) astrograph to take photographs of the same section of sky several nights apart. He then used a blink comparator to compare the different images. When he shifted between the two images, a moving object, such as a planet, would appear to jump from one position to another, while the more distant objects such as stars would appear stationary. Tombaugh noticed such a moving object in his search, near the place predicted by Lowell, and subsequent observations showed it to have an orbit beyond that of Neptune. This ruled out classification as an asteroid, and they decided this was the ninth planet that Lowell had predicted. The discovery was made on Tuesday, February 18, 1930, using images taken the previous month.

Three classical mythological names were proposed: Minerva, Cronus and Pluto. Minerva was eliminated as it was found to already be in use as the name of an asteroid while Cronus was written off as it was feared the astronomer Thomas Jefferson Jackson See who was the primary supporter of it would falsely take credit for it and was widely disliked. In Roman mythology, Pluto can render himself invisible, his name's first two letters are Percival Lowell's initials, and it was proposed by an 11-year-old English girl, Venetia Burney. In order to avoid the name changes suffered by Neptune, the name was proposed to both the American Astronomical Society and the Royal Astronomical Society, both of which approved it unanimously. The name was officially adopted on May 1, 1930.

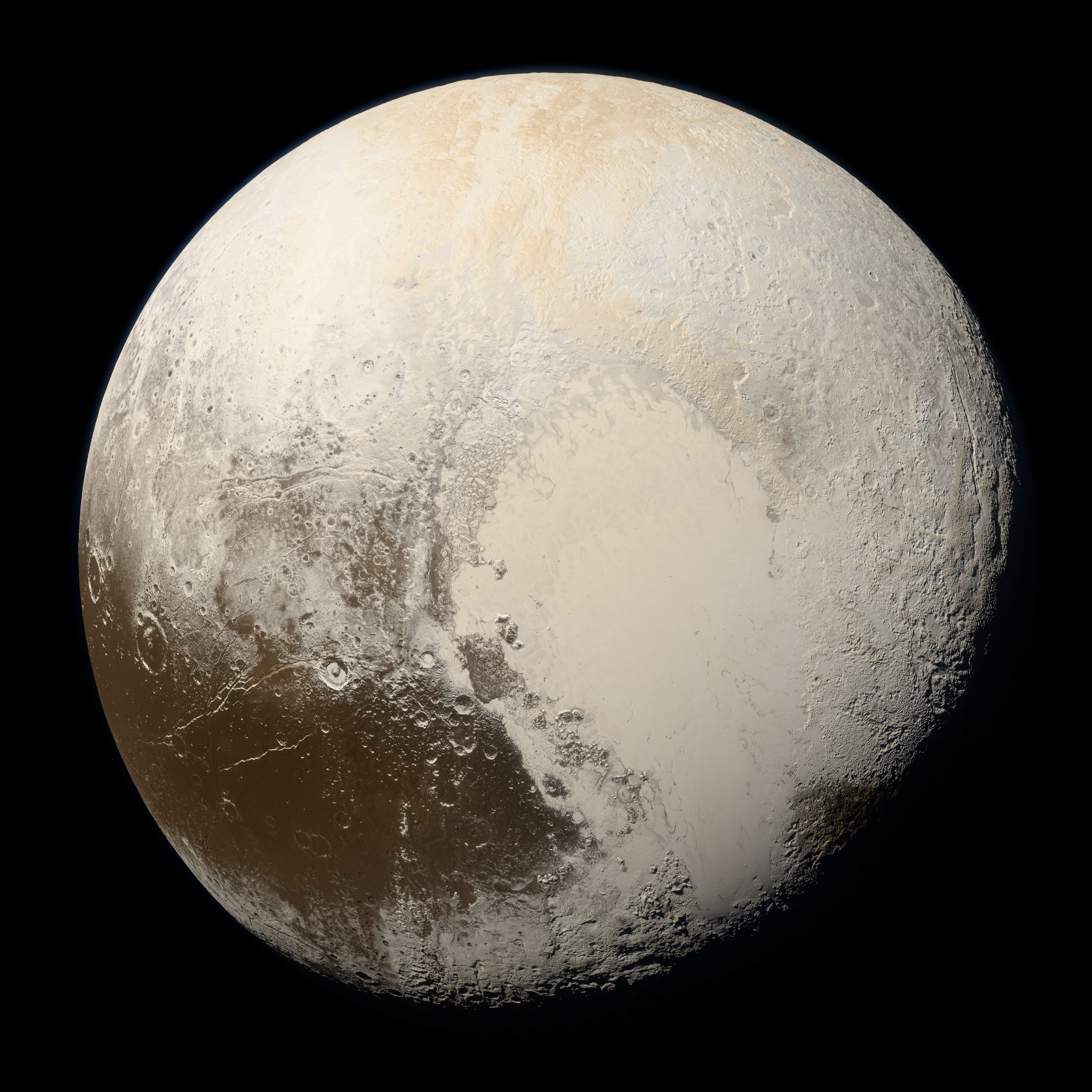
Image of Pluto by the New Horizons spacecraft.

Following the discovery, it was recognized that Pluto was not massive enough to be the expected ninth planet, and some astronomers began to consider it the first of a new class of object – and indeed Tombaugh searched for additional trans-Neptunian objects for years, though due to the lack of any further discoveries he concluded that Pluto was indeed a planet. The idea that Pluto was not a true planet remained a minority position until the discovery of other Kuiper belt objects in the late 1990s, which showed that it did not orbit alone but was at best the largest of a number of icy bodies in its region of space. After it was shown that at least one such body, dubbed Eris, was more massive than Pluto, the International Astronomical Union (IAU) reclassified Pluto on August 24, 2006, as a dwarf planet, leaving eight planets in the Solar System.

Tombaugh's widow Patricia stated after the IAU's decision that while he might have been disappointed with the change since he had resisted attempts to remove Pluto's planetary status in his lifetime, he would have accepted the decision now if he were alive. She noted that: “He was a scientist. He would understand they had a real problem when they start finding several of these things flying around the place." Hal Levison offered this perspective on Tombaugh's place in history: "Clyde Tombaugh discovered the Kuiper Belt. That's a helluva lot more interesting than the ninth planet."

=== Further research ===
Tombaugh continued searching for over a decade after the discovery of Pluto, and the lack of further discoveries left him satisfied that no other object of a comparable apparent magnitude existed near the ecliptic. No more trans-Neptunian objects were discovered until 15760 Albion, in 1992.

In 1936, Tombaugh may have discovered the Perseus–Pegasus Filament, a galaxy filament that stretches for roughly a billion light years in diameter, making it one of the largest structures in the known universe. He referred to it as the Great Perseus–Andromeda stratum of Extra-Galactic Nebulae.

=== Asteroids ===
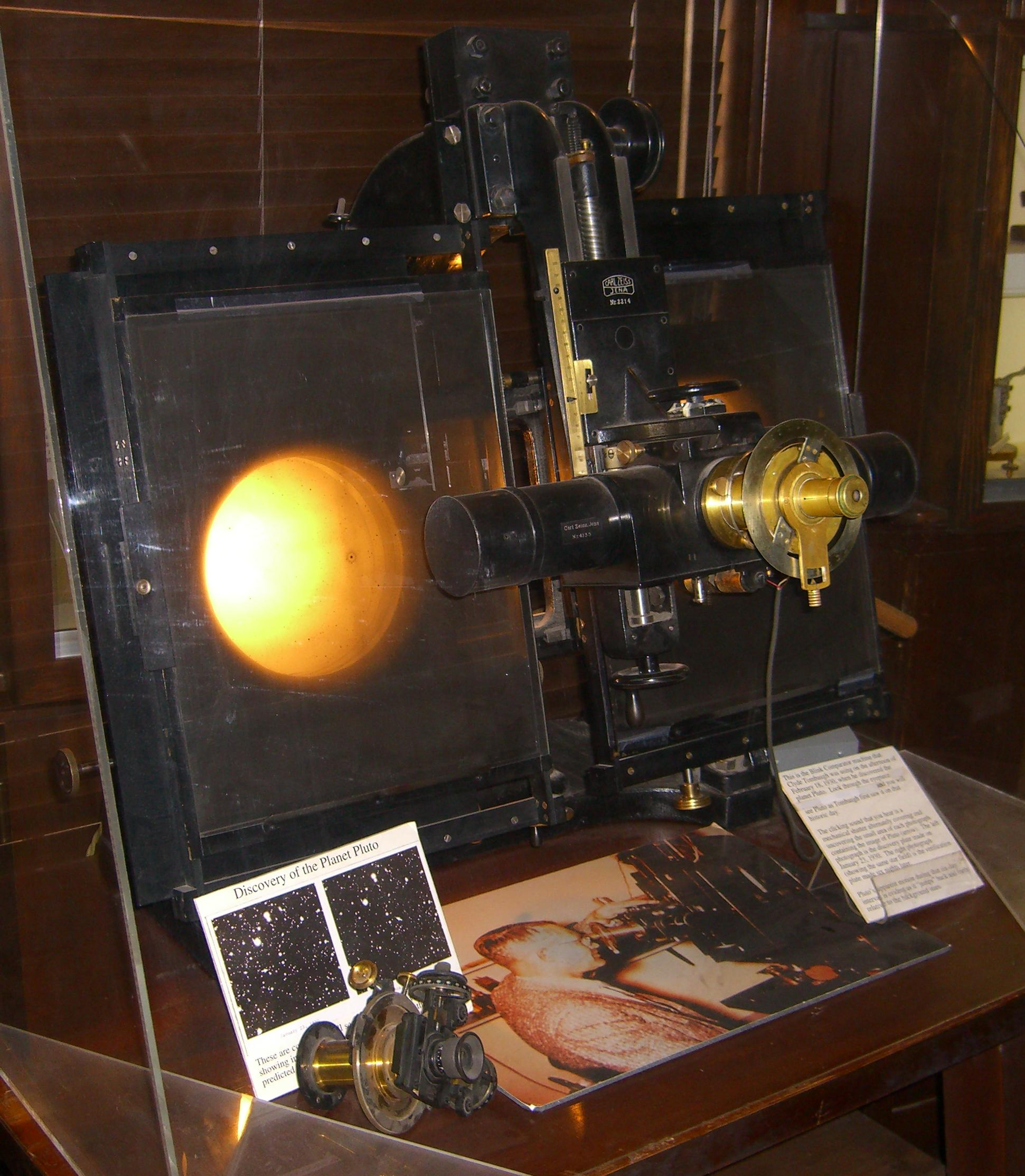
Tombaugh compared his photographic plates using this blink comparator.

Tombaugh is officially credited by the Minor Planet Center with discovering 15 asteroids, and he observed nearly 800 asteroids during his search for Pluto and years of follow-up searches looking for another candidate for the postulated Planet X. Tombaugh is also credited with the discovery of periodic comet 274P/Tombaugh–Tenagra. He also discovered hundreds of variable stars, as well as star clusters, galaxy clusters, and a galaxy supercluster.

Minor planets discovered by Tombaugh
Designation	Discovery
2839 Annette	October 5, 1929
2941 Alden	December 24, 1930
3310 Patsy	October 9, 1931
3583 Burdett	October 5, 1929
3754 Kathleen	March 16, 1931
3775 Ellenbeth	October 6, 1931
3824 Brendalee	October 5, 1929
4510 Shawna	December 13, 1930
4755 Nicky	October 6, 1931
5701 Baltuck	November 3, 1929
6618 Jimsimons	September 16, 1936
7101 Haritina	October 17, 1930
7150 McKellar	October 11, 1929
(8778) 1931 TD3	October 10, 1931
134340 Pluto	January 23, 1930

The asteroid 1604 Tombaugh, discovered in 1931, is named after him. He discovered hundreds of asteroids, beginning with 2839 Annette in 1929, mostly as a by-product of his search for Pluto and his searches for other celestial objects. Tombaugh named some of them after his wife, children and grandchildren. The Royal Astronomical Society awarded him the Jackson-Gwilt Medal in 1931.

=== UFOs ===
Tombaugh was probably the most eminent astronomer to have reported seeing unidentified flying objects. On August 20, 1949, Tombaugh saw several unidentified objects near Las Cruces, New Mexico. He described them as six to eight rectangular lights, stating: "I doubt that the phenomenon was any terrestrial reflection, because... nothing of the kind has ever appeared before or since... I was so unprepared for such a strange sight that I was really petrified with astonishment.".

Tombaugh observed these rectangles of light for about 3 seconds and his wife saw them for about 1 1/2 seconds. He never supported the interpretation as a spaceship that has often been attributed to him. He considered other possibilities, with a temperature inversion as the most likely cause.

From my own studies of the solar system I cannot entertain any serious possibility for intelligent life on other planets, not even for Mars... The logistics of visitations from planets revolving around the nearer stars is staggering. In consideration of the hundreds of millions of years in the geologic time scale when such visits may have possibly occurred, the odds of a single visit in a given century or millennium are overwhelmingly against such an event.

A much more likely source of explanation is some natural optical phenomenon in our own atmosphere. In my 1949 sightings the faintness of the object, together with the manner of fading in intensity as it traveled away from the zenith towards the southeastern horizon, is quite suggestive of a reflection from an optical boundary or surface of slight contrast in refractive index, as in an inversion layer.

I have never seen anything like it before or since, and I have spent a lot of time where the night sky could be seen well. This suggests that the phenomenon involves a comparatively rare set of conditions or circumstances to produce it, but nothing like the odds of an interstellar visitation.

Another sighting by Tombaugh a year or two later while at a White Sands observatory was of an object of −6 magnitude, four times brighter than Venus at its brightest, going from the zenith to the southern horizon in about 3 seconds. The object executed the same maneuvers as in Tombaugh's first sighting.

Tombaugh later reported having seen three of the mysterious green fireballs, which suddenly appeared over New Mexico in late 1948 and continued at least through the early 1950s. A researcher on Project Twinkle reported that Tombaugh "... never observed an unexplainable aerial object despite his continuous and extensive observations of the sky."

Shortly after this, in January 1957, in an Associated Press article in the Alamogordo Daily News titled "Celestial Visitors May Be Invading Earth's Atmosphere", Tombaugh was again quoted on his sightings and opinion about them. "Although our own solar system is believed to support no other life than on Earth, other stars in the galaxy may have hundreds of thousands of habitable worlds. Races on these worlds may have been able to utilize the tremendous amounts of power required to bridge the space between the stars ...". Tombaugh stated that he had observed celestial phenomena which he could not explain, but had seen none personally since 1951 or 1952. "These things, which do appear to be directed, are unlike any other phenomena I ever observed. Their apparent lack of obedience to the ordinary laws of celestial motion gives credence."

In 1949, Tombaugh had also told the Naval missile director at White Sands Missile Range, Commander Robert McLaughlin, that he had seen a bright flash on Mars on August 27, 1941, which he now attributed to an atomic blast. Tombaugh also noted that the first atomic bomb tested in New Mexico would have lit up the dark side of the Earth like a neon sign and that Mars was coincidentally quite close at the time, the implication apparently being that the atomic test would have been visible from Mars.

In June 1952, Dr. J. Allen Hynek, an astronomer acting as a scientific consultant to the Air Force's Project Blue Book UFO study, secretly conducted a survey of fellow astronomers on UFO sightings and attitudes while attending an astronomy convention. Tombaugh and four other astronomers, including Dr. Lincoln LaPaz of the University of New Mexico, told Hynek about their sightings. Tombaugh also told Hynek that his telescopes were at the Air Force's disposal for taking photos of UFOs, if he was properly alerted.

=== Near-Earth objects ===
Tombaugh's offer may have led to his involvement in a search for Near-Earth objects, first announced in late 1953 and sponsored by the Army Office of Ordnance Research. Another public statement was made on the search in March 1954, emphasizing the rationale that such an orbiting object would serve as a natural space station. However, according to Donald Keyhoe, later director of the National Investigations Committee on Aerial Phenomena (NICAP), the real reason for the sudden search was because two near-Earth orbiting objects had been picked up on new long-range radar in the summer of 1953, according to his Pentagon source.

By May 1954, Keyhoe was making public statements that his sources told him the search had indeed been successful, and either one or two objects had been found. However, the story did not break until August 23, 1954, when Aviation Week magazine stated that two satellites had been found only 400 and 600 miles out. They were termed "natural satellites" and implied that they had been recently captured, despite this being a virtual impossibility. The next day, the story was in many major newspapers. Dr. LaPaz was implicated in the discovery in addition to Tombaugh. LaPaz had earlier conducted secret investigations on behalf of the Air Force on the green fireballs and other unidentified aerial phenomena over New Mexico. The New York Times reported on August 29 that "a source close to the O. O. R. unit here described as 'quite accurate' the report in the magazine Aviation Week that two previously unobserved satellites had been spotted and identified by Dr. Lincoln LaPaz of the University of New Mexico as natural and not artificial objects. This source also said there was absolutely no connection between the reported satellites and flying saucer reports." However, in the October 10 issue, LaPaz said the magazine article was "false in every particular, in so far as reference to me is concerned."

Both LaPaz and Tombaugh were to issue public denials that anything had been found. The October 1955 issue of Popular Mechanics magazine reported: "Professor Tombaugh is closemouthed about his results. He won't say whether or not any small natural satellites have been discovered. He does say, however, that newspaper reports of 18 months ago announcing the discovery of natural satellites at 400 and 600 miles out are not correct. He adds that there is no connection between the search program and the reports of so-called flying saucers."

At a meteor conference in Los Angeles in 1957, Tombaugh reiterated that his four-year search for "natural satellites" had been unsuccessful. In 1959, Tombaugh was to issue a final report stating that nothing had been found in his search. His personal 16-inch telescope was reassembled and dedicated on September 17, 2009, at Rancho Hidalgo, New Mexico (near Animas, New Mexico), adjacent to Astronomy's new observatory.

== Other ventures ==
During World War II he taught naval personnel navigation at Northern Arizona University. He worked at White Sands Missile Range in the early 1950s, and taught astronomy at New Mexico State University from 1955 until his retirement in 1973. In 1980 he was inducted into the International Space Hall of Fame. In 1991, he received the American Academy of Achievement's Golden Plate Award presented by Awards Council member Glenn T. Seaborg.

== Later life ==
Direct visual observation became rare in astronomy. By 1965, Robert S. Richardson called Tombaugh one of two great living experienced visual observers as talented as Percival Lowell or Giovanni Schiaparelli. In 1980, Tombaugh and Patrick Moore wrote a book Out of the Darkness: The Planet Pluto. In August 1992, JPL scientist Robert Staehle called Tombaugh, requesting permission to visit his planet. "I told him he was welcome to it," Tombaugh later remembered, "though he's got to go one long, cold trip." The call eventually led to the launch of the New Horizons space probe to Pluto in 2006. Following the passage of Pluto by New Horizons on July 14, 2015, the "Heart of Pluto" was named Tombaugh Regio.

== Personal life ==
Clyde Tombaugh had five siblings. Through the daughter of his youngest brother, Robert, he is the great-uncle of Los Angeles Dodgers pitcher Clayton Kershaw. He married Patricia Edson in 1934. They had two children, Annette and Alden.

Tombaugh was an active Unitarian Universalist, and he and his wife helped found the Unitarian Universalist Church of Las Cruces, New Mexico.

== Death ==
Tombaugh died on January 17, 1997, in Las Cruces, New Mexico, at the age of 90, and he was cremated. A small portion of his ashes was placed aboard the New Horizons spacecraft. The container includes the inscription: "Interred herein are remains of American Clyde W. Tombaugh, discoverer of Pluto and the Solar System's 'third zone'. Adelle and Muron's boy, Patricia's husband, Annette and Alden's father, astronomer, teacher, punster and friend: Clyde W. Tombaugh (1906–1997)". Tombaugh was survived by his wife, Patricia (1912–2012), and their children, Annette and Alden.

== In popular culture ==
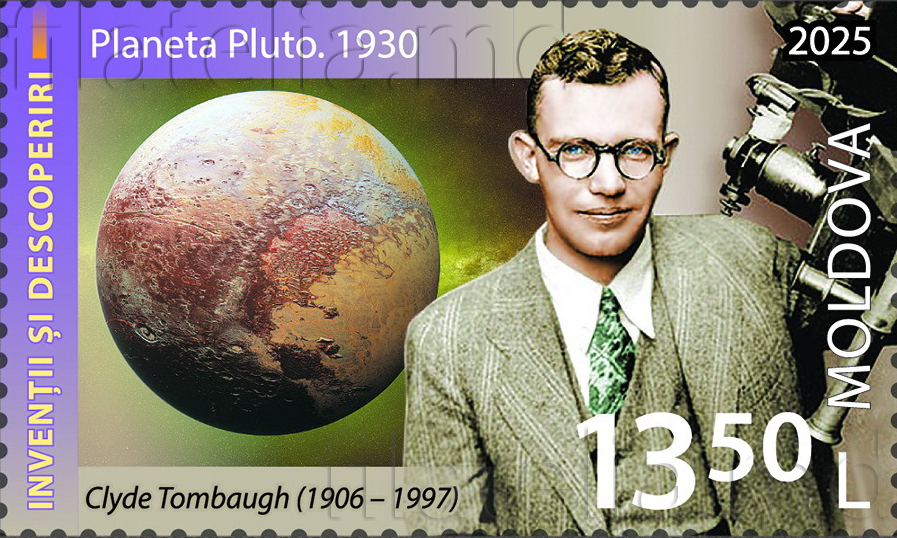
Tombaugh on a 2025 stamp of Moldova

- Clyde Tombaugh's fame for his discovery of Pluto sufficiently qualified him to be a contestant on the October 24, 1956, episode of the game show I've Got A Secret.
- The 2006 release The Avalanche by musical artist Sufjan Stevens contains an instrumental track titled "For Clyde Tombaugh".
- The ninth episode of the fourth season of Fargo featured a visit to a memorial marking the site of Tombaugh's boyhood home.
- Robert Heinlein's 1958 juvenile science fiction novel Have Space Suit – Will Travel features a scientific base on Earth's moon called Tombaugh Station. When the hero arrives on Pluto, he reflects:

I had never been much interested in Pluto—too few facts and too much speculation, too far away and not desirable real estate. By comparison the Moon was a choice residential suburb. Professor Tombaugh (the one the station was named for) was working on a giant electronic telescope to photograph it, under a Guggenheim grant, but he had a special interest; he discovered Pluto years before I was born.

— Robert A. Heinlein, Have Space Suit – Will Travel, Ace paperback, p. 113

== See also ==
- List of astronomers
- Tombaugh (crater)
- Tombaugh Cliffs
- Tombaugh Regio

== Sources ==
- Falk, Dan, "More than a one-hit wonder", Astronomy, February 2006, 40–45.
- David H. Levy Clyde Tombaugh: Discoverer of the Planet Pluto (Tucson, Ariz.: University of Arizona Press, 1991). ISBN 0816511489; also Sky Publishing Corporation, March 2006.
