= Pluto =

Largest dwarf planet in the Solar System

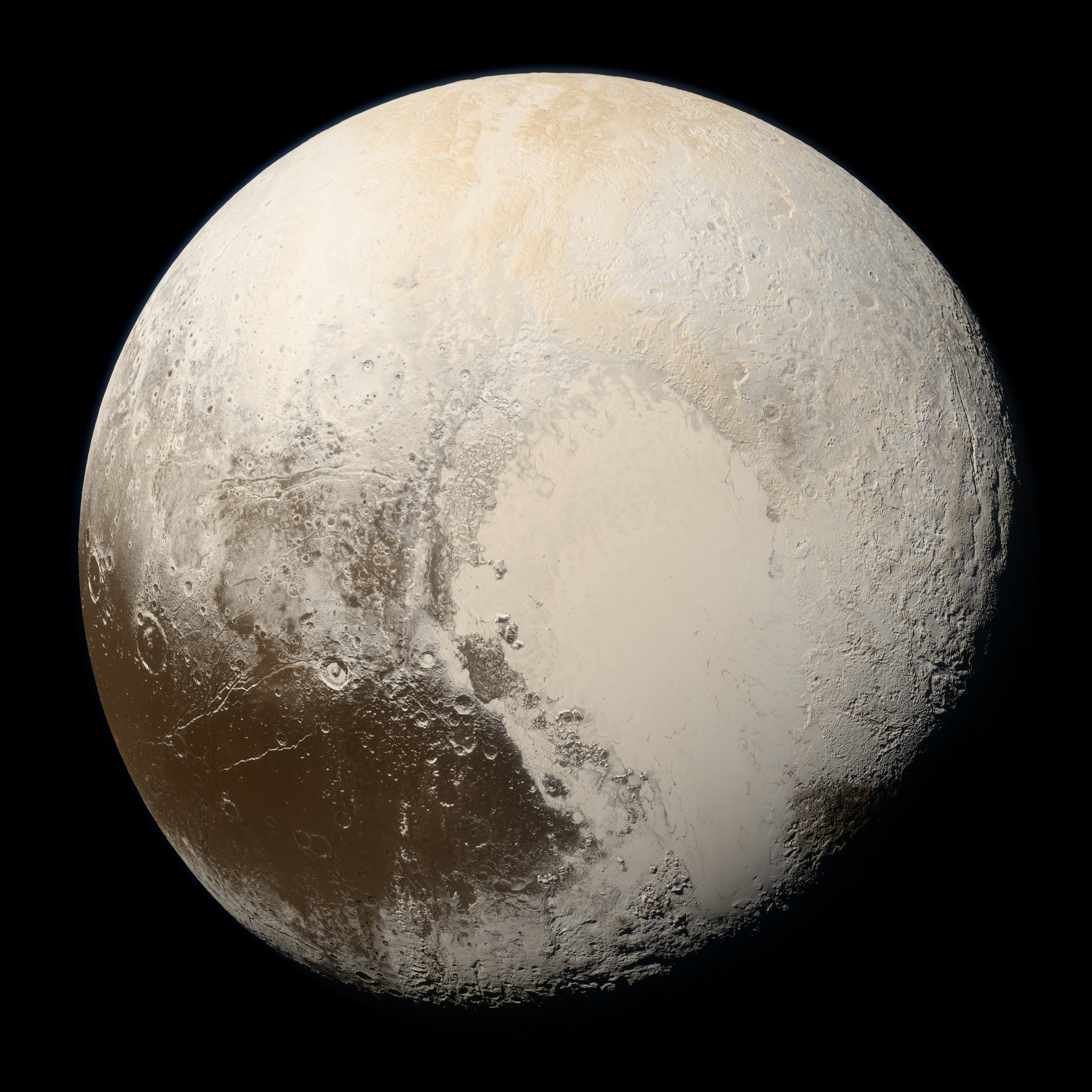
- Pluto in true color as imaged by Ralph aboard the New Horizons spacecraft from a distance of 35,445 km (22,025 mi) on July 14, 2015

Discovery
- Discovered by: Clyde W. Tombaugh
- Discovery site: Lowell Observatory
- Discovery date: February 18, 1930

Designations
- Pronunciation: /ˈpluːtoʊ/
- Named after: Pluto
- Alternative designations: (134340) Pluto
- Minor planet category: Dwarf planet; Trans-Neptunian object; Kuiper belt object; Plutino
- Adjectives: Plutonian /pluːˈtoʊniən/
- Symbol: or

Orbital characteristics (Note: The mean elements here are from the Theory of the Outer Planets (TOP2013) solution by the Institut de mécanique céleste et de calcul des éphémérides (IMCCE). They refer to the standard equinox J2000, the barycenter of the Solar System, and the epoch J2000.)
- Epoch J2000
- Earliest precovery date: August 20, 1909
- Aphelion: 49.305 AU; (7.37593 billion km); February 2114
- Perihelion: 29.658 AU; (4.43682 billion km); (September 5, 1989)
- Semi-major axis: 39.482 AU; (5.90638 billion km)
- Eccentricity: 0.2488
- Orbital period (sidereal): 247.94 years; 90,560 d
- Orbital period (synodic): 366.73 days
- Average orbital speed: 4.743 km/s
- Mean anomaly: 14.53 deg
- Inclination: 17.16°; (11.88° to Sun's equator)
- Longitude of ascending node: 110.299°
- Argument of perihelion: 113.834°
- Known satellites: 5
- Uranus MOID: 12 AU (1.80 billion km)
- Neptune MOID: 2.46 AU (368 million km) (Note: A strong 3:2 resonance with Neptune prevents Neptune+Pluto from getting closer than 17 AU (2.5 billion km). Pluto actually gets closer to Uranus than it does Neptune.)

Physical characteristics
- Dimensions: 2,376.6±1.6 km (observations consistent with a sphere, predicted deviations too small to be observed)
- Mean radius: 1,188.3±0.8 km; 0.1868 Earths
- Flattening: <1%
- Surface area: 1.774443×10^{7} km^{2} (Note: Surface area derived from the radius r: $4\pi r^2$.); 0.035 Earths
- Volume: (7.057±0.004)×10^{9} km^{3} (Note: Volume v derived from the radius r: $4\pi r^3/3$.); 0.00651 Earths
- Mass: (1.3025±0.0006)×10^{22} kg; 0.00218 Earths; 0.177 Moons
- Mean density: 1.853±0.004 g/cm^{3}
- Equatorial surface gravity: 0.620 m/s^{2} (0.0632 g_{0}) (Note: Surface gravity derived from the mass M, the gravitational constant G and the radius r: $GM/r^2$.)
- Equatorial escape velocity: 1.212 km/s (Note: Escape velocity derived from the mass M, the gravitational constant G and the radius r: $\sqrt{2GM/r}$.)
- Synodic rotation period: −6.38680 d; −6 d, 9 h, 17 m, 00 s
- Sidereal rotation period: −6.387222 d; −6 d, 9 h, 17 m, 36 s
- Equatorial rotation velocity: 13.53 m/s
- Axial tilt: 119.51° (to orbit)
- North pole right ascension: 132.993°
- North pole declination: −6.163°
- Geometric albedo: 0.52 geometric (locally 0.08–1.0); 0.72 ± 0.07 Bond
Surface temp.	min	mean	max
Kelvin	33 K	44 K (−229 °C)	55 K
- Apparent magnitude: 13.65 to 16.3 (mean is 15.1)
- Absolute magnitude (H): −0.55
- Angular diameter: 0.06″ to 0.11″ (Note: Based on geometry of minimum and maximum distance from Earth and Pluto radius in the factsheet)

Atmosphere
- Surface pressure: 1.0 Pa (2015) (9.9×10^{−6} atm)
- Composition by volume: Nitrogen, methane, carbon monoxide

Pluto (minor-planet number 134340) is a dwarf planet in the Kuiper belt, a ring of bodies beyond the orbit of Neptune. It is the ninth-largest and tenth-most-massive known object to directly orbit the Sun. It is the largest known trans-Neptunian object by volume by a small margin, but is less massive than Eris, which is denser, making it the second most massive trans-Neptunian object. Like other Kuiper belt objects, Pluto is made primarily of ice and rock and is much smaller than the inner planets. Pluto has roughly one-sixth the mass of the Moon and one-third of its volume. Originally considered a planet, its status was changed when astronomers adopted a new definition of the word with new criteria.

Pluto has a moderately eccentric and inclined orbit, ranging from 30 to 49 astronomical units (4.5 to 7.3 billion kilometres; 2.8 to 4.6 billion miles) from the Sun. Light from the Sun takes 5.5 hours to reach Pluto at its orbital distance of 39.5 AU (5.91 billion km; 3.67 billion mi). Pluto's eccentric orbit periodically brings it closer to the Sun than Neptune, but a stable orbital resonance prevents them from colliding.

Pluto has five known moons: Charon (the largest and the diameter of which is just over half that of Pluto), Styx, Nix, Kerberos, and Hydra. Pluto and Charon are sometimes considered a binary system because the barycenter of their orbits (that is, their center of mass) does not lie within either body, and they are tidally locked. New Horizons was the first spacecraft to visit Pluto and its moons, making a flyby on July 14, 2015, and taking detailed measurements and observations.

Pluto was discovered in 1930 by Clyde W. Tombaugh, making it the first known object in the Kuiper belt. It was immediately hailed as the ninth planet, but its planetary status was questioned when it was found to be much smaller than expected. These doubts increased following the discovery of additional objects in the Kuiper belt starting in the 1990s, particularly the more massive scattered disk object Eris in 2005. In 2006, the International Astronomical Union (IAU) formally redefined the term planet to exclude dwarf planets such as Pluto. Many planetary astronomers, however, continue to consider Pluto and other dwarf planets to be planets.

== History ==
=== Discovery ===
In the 1840s, Urbain Le Verrier used Newtonian mechanics to predict the position of the then-undiscovered planet Neptune after analyzing perturbations in the orbit of Uranus. Subsequent observations of Neptune in the late 19th century led astronomers to speculate that Uranus's orbit was being disturbed by another planet besides Neptune.

In 1906, Percival Lowell—a wealthy Bostonian who had founded Lowell Observatory in Flagstaff, Arizona, in 1894—started an extensive project in search of a possible ninth planet, which he termed "Planet X". In 1909, Lowell and William H. Pickering suggested several possible celestial coordinates for such a planet. Lowell and his observatory conducted his search, using mathematical calculations made by Elizabeth Williams, until his death in 1916, but to no avail. Unknown to Lowell, his surveys had captured two faint images of Pluto on March 19 and April 7, 1915, but they were not recognized for what they were. There are fourteen other known precovery observations, with the earliest made by the Yerkes Observatory on August 20, 1909.

Percival's widow, Constance Lowell, entered into a ten-year legal battle with the Lowell Observatory over her husband's legacy, and the search for Planet X did not resume until 1929. Vesto Melvin Slipher, the observatory director, gave the job of locating Planet X to 23-year-old Clyde Tombaugh, who had just arrived at the observatory after Slipher had been impressed by a sample of his astronomical drawings.

Tombaugh's task was to systematically image the night sky in pairs of photographs, then examine each pair and determine whether any objects had shifted position. Using a blink comparator, he rapidly shifted back and forth between views of each of the plates to create the illusion of movement of any objects that had changed position or appearance between photographs. On February 18, 1930, after nearly a year's search, Tombaugh discovered a possible moving object on photographic plates taken on January 23 and 29. A lesser-quality photograph taken on January 21 helped confirm the movement. After the observatory obtained further confirmatory photographs, news of the discovery was telegraphed to the Harvard College Observatory on March 13, 1930.

The object was immediately hailed as the ninth planet. However, its planetary status was questioned when it was found to be much smaller than expected.

One Plutonian year corresponds to 247.94 Earth years; thus, in 2178, Pluto will complete its first orbit since its discovery.

=== Name ===
The name Pluto came from the Roman god of the underworld; and it is also an epithet for Hades (the Greek equivalent of Pluto).

Upon the announcement of the discovery, Lowell Observatory received over a thousand suggestions for names. Three names topped the list: Minerva, Pluto and Cronus. 'Minerva' was the Lowell staff's first choice but was rejected because it had already been used for an asteroid; Cronus was disfavored because it was promoted by an unpopular and egocentric astronomer, Thomas Jefferson Jackson See. A vote was then taken and 'Pluto' was the unanimous choice. To make sure the name stuck, and that the planet would not suffer changes in its name as Uranus had, Lowell Observatory proposed the name to the American Astronomical Society and the Royal Astronomical Society; both approved it unanimously. The name was published on May 1, 1930.

The name Pluto had received some 150 nominations among the letters and telegrams sent to Lowell. The first (Note: A French astronomer had suggested the name Pluto for Planet X in 1919, but there is no indication that the Lowell staff knew of this.) had been from Venetia Burney (1918–2009), an eleven-year-old schoolgirl in Oxford, England, who was interested in classical mythology. She had suggested it to her grandfather Falconer Madan when he read the news of Pluto's discovery to his family over breakfast; Madan passed the suggestion to astronomy professor Herbert Hall Turner, who cabled it to colleagues at Lowell on March 16, three days after the announcement.

The name 'Pluto' was mythologically appropriate: the god Pluto was one of six surviving children of Saturn, and the others had already all been chosen as names of major or minor planets (his brothers Jupiter and Neptune, and his sisters Ceres, Juno and Vesta). Both the god and the planet inhabited "gloomy" regions, and the god was able to make himself invisible, as the planet had been for so long. The choice was further helped by the fact that the first two letters of Pluto were the initials of Percival Lowell; indeed, 'Percival' had been one of the more popular suggestions for a name for the new planet.

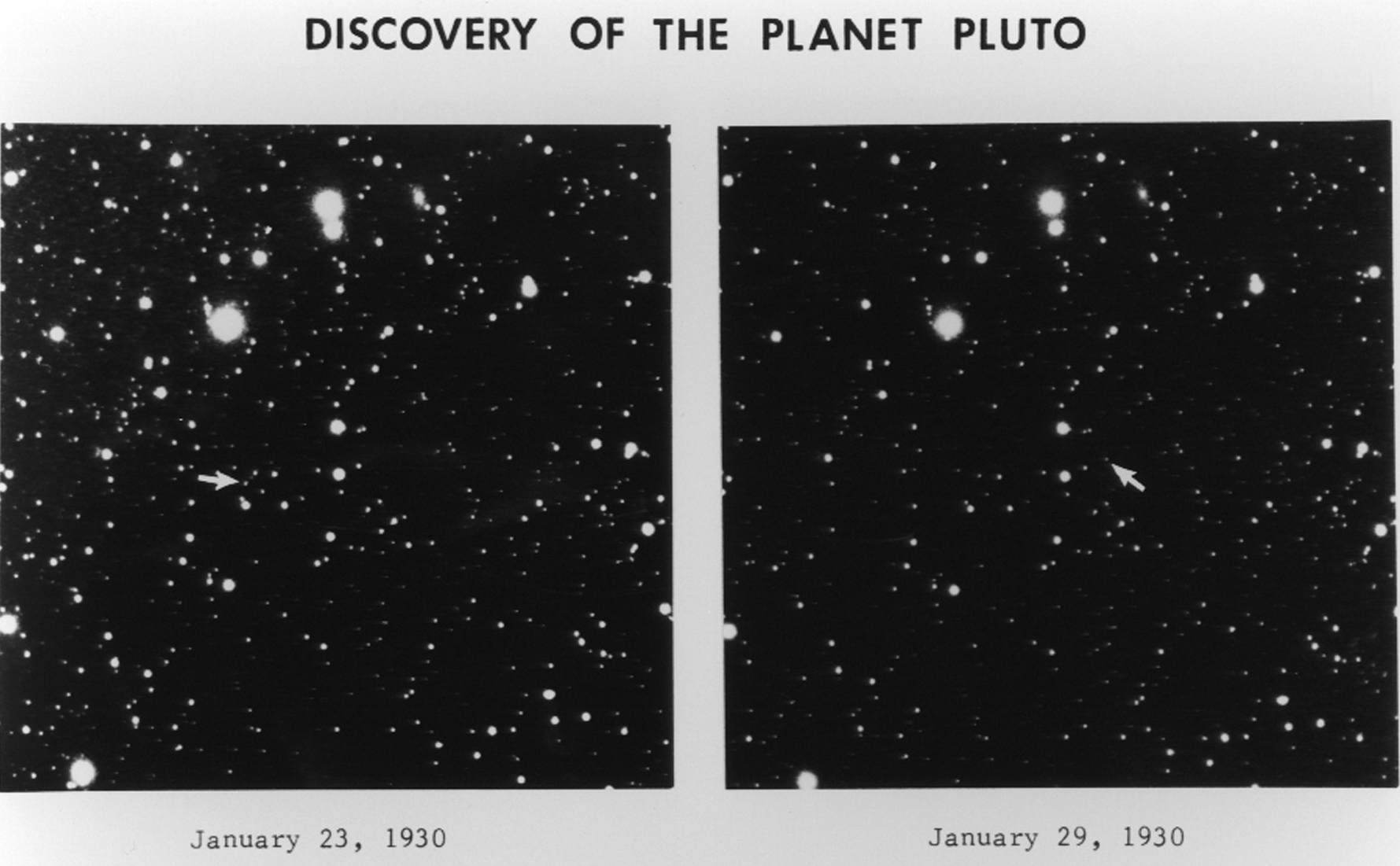
Discovery photographs of Pluto

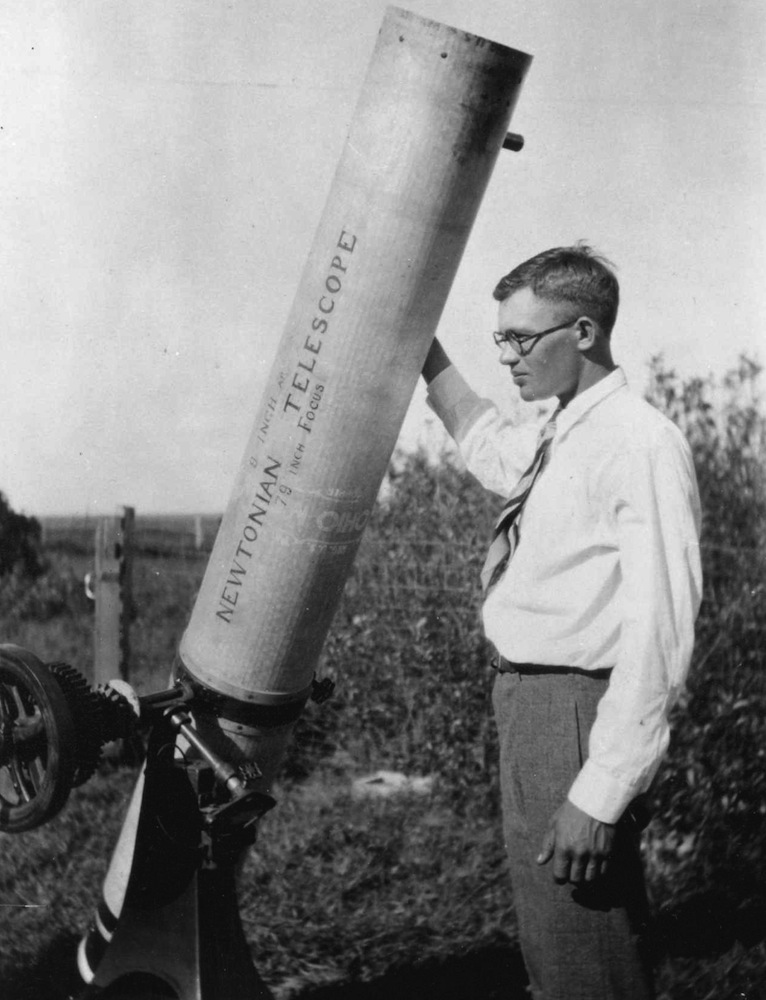
Clyde Tombaugh, in Kansas

=== Symbol ===
Once named, Pluto's planetary symbol ⟨⟩ was then created as a monogram of the letters "PL". This symbol is rarely used in astronomy anymore, (Note: For example, ⟨♇⟩ (in Unicode: U+2647 ♇ PLUTO) occurs in a table of the planets identified by their symbols in a 2004 article written before the 2006 IAU definition, but not in a graph of planets, dwarf planets and moons from 2016, where only the eight IAU planets are identified by their symbols. (Planetary symbols in general are uncommon in astronomy, and are discouraged by the IAU.)) though it is still common in astrology. However, the most common astrological symbol for Pluto, occasionally used in astronomy as well, is an orb (possibly representing Pluto's invisibility cap) over Pluto's bident ⟨⟩, which dates to the early 1930s. (Note: The bident symbol (U+2BD3 ⯓ PLUTO FORM TWO) has seen some astronomical use as well since the IAU decision on dwarf planets, for example in a public-education poster on dwarf planets published by the NASA/JPL Dawn mission in 2015, in which each of the five dwarf planets announced by the IAU receives a symbol. There are in addition several other symbols for Pluto found in astrological sources, including three accepted by Unicode:, U+2BD4 ⯔ PLUTO FORM THREE, used principally in southern Europe; /, U+2BD6 ⯖ PLUTO FORM FIVE (found in various orientations, showing Pluto's orbit cutting across that of Neptune), used principally in northern Europe; and, U+2BD5 ⯕ PLUTO FORM FOUR, used in Uranian astrology.)

The name 'Pluto' was soon embraced by wider culture. In 1930, Walt Disney was apparently inspired by it when he introduced for Mickey Mouse a canine companion named Pluto, although Disney animator Ben Sharpsteen could not confirm why the name was given. In 1941, Glenn T. Seaborg named the newly created element plutonium after Pluto, in keeping with the tradition of naming elements after newly discovered planets, following uranium, which was named after Uranus, and neptunium, which was named after Neptune.

Most languages use the name "Pluto" in various transliterations. (Note: The equivalence is less close in languages whose phonology differs widely from Greek's, such as Somali Buluuto and Navajo Tłóotoo.) In Japanese, Houei Nojiri suggested the calque Meiōsei (冥王星, "Star of the King (God) of the Underworld"), and this was borrowed into Chinese and Korean. Some languages of India use the name Pluto, but others, such as Hindi, use the name of Yama, the God of Death in Hinduism. Polynesian languages also tend to use the indigenous god of the underworld, as in Māori Whiro. Vietnamese does not follow the Chinese usage due to a phonological constraint: the Sino-Vietnamese word 冥 minh "dark" is homophonous with 明 minh "bright". Instead, Vietnamese uses Yama, which is also a Buddhist deity, in the form of Sao Diêm Vương 星閻王 "Yama's Star", derived from Chinese 閻王 Yán Wáng / Yìhm Wòhng "King Yama".

=== Planet X disproved ===
Once Pluto was found, its faintness and lack of a viewable disc cast doubt on the idea that it was Lowell's Planet X. Estimates of Pluto's mass were revised downward throughout the 20th century.

Mass estimates for Pluto
Year	Mass	Estimate by
1915	7 Earths	Lowell (prediction for Planet X)
1931	1 Earth	Nicholson & Mayall
1948	0.1 (1/10) Earth	Kuiper
1971	0.11 (1/9) Earth	Seidelmann, Klepczynski, Duncombe, & Jackson
1976	less than 0.01 (1/100) Earth; 0.002–0.005 (1/200–1/500) Earth	Cruikshank, Pilcher, & Morrison
1978	0.0017 (1/588) Earth	Christy & Harrington
2006	0.00218 (1/459) Earth	Buie et al.

Astronomers initially calculated its mass based on its presumed effect on Neptune and Uranus. In 1931, Pluto was calculated to be roughly the mass of Earth, with further calculations in 1948 bringing the mass down to roughly that of Mars. In 1950, Kuiper observed Pluto's disk for the first time and estimated that its radius is around 2,950 km, or slightly smaller than Mars; the non-observation of a predicted stellar occultation in 1965 affirmed this constraint, setting an upper limit of 3,400 km. A value of 0.11±0.02 Earth masses was found by Seidelmann and colleagues in 1971, based on the assumption that Pluto was perturbing the orbit of Neptune. In 1976, Dale Cruikshank, Carl Pilcher and David Morrison of the University of Hawaiʻi found evidence that Pluto's surface was covered in methane ice; based on this, they were able to calculate Pluto's albedo for the first time. They concluded that Pluto had to be exceptionally bright for its size, with a geometric albedo between 0.4 and 0.6, and therefore 1,400–1,650 km in radius, smaller than even the Moon. It could not be more than 1 percent the mass of Earth. Cruikshank and colleagues pointed out that Pluto's mass, which they estimated to be a few thousandths the mass of the Earth, was insufficient to have any appreciable effect on the orbits of Uranus or Neptune, and they acknowledged that Tombaugh's discovery was the result of a thorough search rather than any kind of prediction.

In 1978, the discovery of Pluto's moon Charon allowed the measurement of Pluto's mass for the first time: roughly 0.2% that of Earth, and far too small to account for the discrepancies in the orbit of Uranus. Subsequent searches for an alternative Planet X, notably by Robert Sutton Harrington, failed. In 1992, Myles Standish used data from Voyager 2's flyby of Neptune in 1989, which had revised the estimates of Neptune's mass downward by 0.5%—an amount comparable to the mass of Mars—to recalculate its gravitational effect on Uranus. With the new figures added in, the discrepancies, and with them the need for a Planet X, vanished.

As of 2000 the majority of scientists agreed that Planet X, as Lowell defined it, does not exist. Lowell had made a prediction of Planet X's orbit and position in 1915 that was fairly close to Pluto's actual orbit and its position at that time. Ernest W. Brown concluded soon after Pluto's discovery that this was a coincidence.

=== Classification ===
From 1992 onward, many bodies were discovered orbiting in the same volume as Pluto, showing that Pluto is part of a population of objects called the Kuiper belt. This made its official status as a planet controversial, with many questioning whether Pluto should be considered together with or separately from its surrounding population. Museum and planetarium directors occasionally created controversy by omitting Pluto from planetary models of the Solar System. In February 2000 the Hayden Planetarium in New York City displayed a Solar System model of only eight planets, which made headlines almost a year later.

Ceres, Pallas, Juno and Vesta lost their planet status among most astronomers after the discovery of many other asteroids in the 1840s. On the other hand, planetary geologists often regarded Ceres, and less often Pallas and Vesta, as being different from smaller asteroids because they were large enough to have undergone geological evolution. Although the first Kuiper belt objects discovered were quite small, objects increasingly closer in size to Pluto were soon discovered, some large enough (like Pluto itself) to satisfy geological but not dynamical ideas of planethood.

In 1998, Brian G. Marsden of Harvard University's Minor Planet Center suggested that Pluto be given the minor planet number 10000 while still retaining its official position as a planet. The prospect of Pluto's "demotion" created a public outcry, and in response the International Astronomical Union (IAU) clarified that it was not at that time proposing to remove Pluto from the planet list.

In the early 2000's, astronomers at Caltech led by Michael E. Brown undertook a wide survey of the skies using digital detection technology, finding numerous Trans-Neptunian objects. Many of these objects were initially measured as larger than or equal in size to Pluto, igniting a debate over whether or not to consider them planets. Later, estimates were revised down due to higher than expected albedos.

The debate became unavoidable when, in July 2005, these astronomers announced the discovery of a new object, Eris, which was substantially more massive than Pluto and the most massive object discovered in the Solar System since Triton in 1846. The press initially called it the tenth planet, although there was no official consensus at the time on whether to call it a planet. Others in the astronomical community considered the discovery the strongest argument for reclassifying Pluto as a minor planet.

==== IAU classification ====
The debate came to a head in August 2006 during the triennial meeting of the IAU, when Uruguayan astronomers Julio Ángel Fernández and Gonzalo Tancredi first proposed the new definition for the term "planet". According to their proposal, there are three conditions for an object in the Solar System to be considered a planet:

- The object must be in orbit around the Sun.
- The object must be massive enough to be rounded by its own gravity. More specifically, its own gravity should pull it into a shape defined by hydrostatic equilibrium.
- It must have cleared the neighborhood around its orbit.

Pluto fails to meet the third condition. Its mass is substantially less than the combined mass of the other objects in its orbit: 0.07 times, in contrast to Earth, which is 1.7 million times the remaining mass in its orbit (excluding the moon). The IAU further decided that bodies that, like Pluto, meet criteria 1 and 2, but do not meet criterion 3 would be called dwarf planets. In September 2006, the IAU included Pluto, and Eris and its moon Dysnomia, in their Minor Planet Catalogue, giving them the official minor-planet designations "(134340) Pluto", "(136199) Eris", and "(136199) Eris I Dysnomia". Had Pluto been included upon its discovery in 1930, it would have likely been designated 1164, following 1163 Saga, which was discovered a month earlier.

There has been some resistance within the astronomical community toward the reclassification, and in particular planetary scientists often continue to reject it, considering Pluto, Charon, and Eris to be planets for the same reason they do so for Ceres. In effect, this amounts to accepting only the second clause of the IAU definition. Alan Stern, principal investigator with NASA's New Horizons mission to Pluto, derided the IAU resolution. He also stated that because less than five percent of astronomers voted for it, the decision was not representative of the entire astronomical community. Marc W. Buie, then at the Lowell Observatory, petitioned against the definition. Others have supported the IAU, for example Mike Brown, the astronomer who discovered Eris.

Public reception to the IAU decision was mixed. A resolution introduced in the California State Assembly facetiously called the IAU decision a "scientific heresy". The New Mexico House of Representatives passed a resolution in honor of Clyde Tombaugh, the discoverer of Pluto and a longtime resident of that state, that declared that Pluto will always be considered a planet while in New Mexican skies and that March 13, 2007, was Pluto Planet Day. The Illinois Senate passed a similar resolution in 2009 on the basis that Tombaugh was born in Illinois. The resolution asserted that Pluto was "unfairly downgraded to a 'dwarf' planet" by the IAU."

Some members of the public have also rejected the change, citing the disagreement within the scientific community on the issue, or for sentimental reasons, maintaining that they have always known Pluto as a planet and will continue to do so regardless of the IAU decision. In 2006, in its 17th annual words-of-the-year vote, the American Dialect Society voted plutoed as the word of the year. To "pluto" is to "demote or devalue someone or something". In April 2024, Arizona (where Pluto was first discovered in 1930) passed a law naming Pluto as the official state planet.

Researchers on both sides of the debate gathered in August 2008, at the Johns Hopkins University Applied Physics Laboratory for a conference that included back-to-back talks on the IAU definition of a planet. Entitled "The Great Planet Debate", the conference published a post-conference press release indicating that scientists could not come to a consensus about the definition of planet. In June 2008, the IAU had announced in a press release that the term "plutoid" would henceforth be used to refer to Pluto and other planetary-mass objects that have an orbital semi-major axis greater than that of Neptune, though the term has not seen significant use.

== Orbit ==
An animation of Pluto's orbit from 1850 to 2097 Sun · Saturn · Uranus · Neptune · Pluto

Pluto's orbital period is about 248 years. Its orbital characteristics are substantially different from those of the planets, which follow nearly circular orbits around the Sun close to a flat reference plane called the ecliptic. In contrast, Pluto's orbit is moderately inclined relative to the ecliptic (over 17°) and moderately eccentric (elliptical). This eccentricity means a small region of Pluto's orbit lies closer to the Sun than Neptune's. The Pluto–Charon barycenter came to perihelion on September 5, 1989, (Note: The discovery of Charon in 1978 allowed astronomers to accurately calculate the mass of the Plutonian system. But it did not indicate the two bodies' individual masses, which could only be estimated after other moons of Pluto were discovered in late 2005. As a result, because Pluto came to perihelion in 1989, most Pluto perihelion date estimates are based on the Pluto–Charon barycenter. Charon came to perihelion 4 September 1989. The Pluto–Charon barycenter came to perihelion 5 September 1989. Pluto came to perihelion 8 September 1989.) and was last closer to the Sun than Neptune between February 7, 1979, and February 11, 1999.

Although the 3:2 resonance with Neptune (see below) is maintained, Pluto's inclination and eccentricity behave in a chaotic manner. Computer simulations can be used to predict its position for several million years (both forward and backward in time), but after intervals much longer than the Lyapunov time of 10–20 million years, calculations become unreliable: Pluto is sensitive to immeasurably small details of the Solar System, hard-to-predict factors that will gradually change Pluto's position in its orbit.

The semi-major axis of Pluto's orbit varies between about 39.3 and 39.6 AU with a period of about 19,951 years, corresponding to an orbital period varying between 246 and 249 years. The semi-major axis and period are presently getting longer.

=== Relationship with Neptune ===
Orbit of Pluto – ecliptic view. This "side view" of Pluto's orbit (in red) shows its large inclination to the ecliptic. Neptune is seen orbiting close to the ecliptic.

Despite Pluto's orbit appearing to cross that of Neptune when viewed from north or south of the Solar System, the two objects' orbits do not intersect. When Pluto is closest to the Sun, and close to Neptune's orbit as viewed from such a position, it is also the farthest north of Neptune's path. Pluto's orbit passes about 8 AU north of that of Neptune, preventing a collision. (Note: Because of the eccentricity of Pluto's orbit, some have theorized that it was once a satellite of Neptune.)

This alone is not enough to protect Pluto; perturbations from the planets (especially Neptune) could alter Pluto's orbit (such as its orbital precession) over millions of years so that a collision could happen. However, Pluto is also protected by its 3:2 orbital resonance with Neptune: for every two orbits that Pluto makes around the Sun, Neptune makes three, in a frame of reference that rotates at the rate that Pluto's perihelion precesses (about 0.97×10^{−4} degrees per year).

Each cycle lasts about 495 years. There are many other objects in this same resonance, called plutinos. At present, in each 495-year cycle, the first time Pluto is at perihelion (such as in 1989), Neptune is 57° ahead of Pluto. By Pluto's second passage through perihelion, Neptune will have completed a further one and a half of its own orbits, and will be 123° behind Pluto. Pluto and Neptune's minimum separation is over 17 AU, which is greater than Pluto's minimum separation from Uranus (11 AU). The minimum separation between Pluto and Neptune actually occurs near the time of Pluto's aphelion.

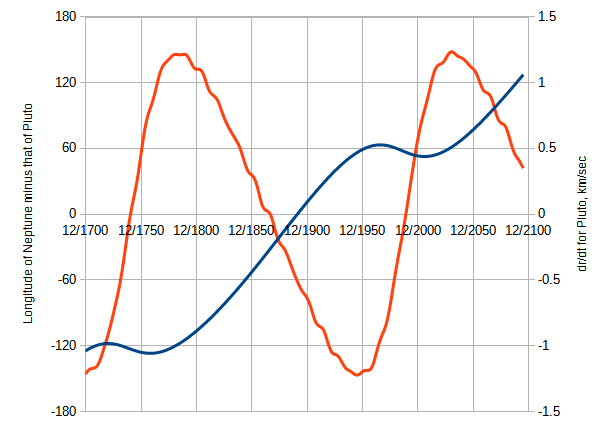
The ecliptic longitude of Neptune minus that of Pluto (blue), and rate of change of Pluto's distance from the Sun (red). The red curve crosses zero at perihelion and aphelion.

The 3:2 resonance between the two bodies is highly stable and has been preserved over millions of years. This prevents their orbits from changing relative to one another, so the two bodies can never pass near each other. Even if Pluto's orbit were not inclined, the two bodies could never collide.

When Pluto's period is slightly different from 3/2 of Neptune's, the pattern of its distance from Neptune will drift. Near perihelion Pluto moves interior to Neptune's orbit and is therefore moving faster, so during the first of two orbits in the 495-year cycle, it is approaching Neptune from behind. At present it remains between 50° and 65° behind Neptune for 100 years (e.g. 1937–2036).

The gravitational pull between the two causes angular momentum to be transferred to Pluto. This situation moves Pluto into a slightly larger orbit, where it has a slightly longer period, according to Kepler's third law. After several such repetitions, Pluto is sufficiently delayed that at the second perihelion of each cycle it will not be far ahead of Neptune coming behind it, and Neptune will start to decrease Pluto's period again. The whole cycle takes about 20,000 years to complete.

==== Other factors ====
Numerical studies have shown that over millions of years, the general nature of the alignment between the orbits of Pluto and Neptune does not change. There are several other resonances and interactions that enhance Pluto's stability. These arise principally from two additional mechanisms (besides the 3:2 mean-motion resonance).

First, Pluto's argument of perihelion, the angle between the point where it crosses the ecliptic (or the invariant plane) and the point where it is closest to the Sun, librates around 90°. This means that when Pluto is closest to the Sun, it is at its farthest north of the plane of the Solar System, preventing encounters with Neptune. This is a consequence of the Kozai mechanism, which relates the eccentricity of an orbit to its inclination to a larger perturbing body—in this case, Neptune. Relative to Neptune, the amplitude of libration is 38°, and so the angular separation of Pluto's perihelion to the orbit of Neptune is always greater than 52° (90°–38°). The closest such angular separation occurs every 10,000 years.

Second, the longitudes of ascending nodes of the two bodies—the points where they cross the invariant plane—are in near-resonance with the above libration. When the two longitudes are the same—that is, when one could draw a straight line through both nodes and the Sun—Pluto's perihelion lies exactly at 90°, and hence it comes closest to the Sun when it is furthest north of Neptune's orbit. This is known as the 1:1 superresonance. All the Jovian planets (Jupiter, Saturn, Uranus, and Neptune) play a role in the creation of the superresonance.

== Rotation ==
A rotation movie of Pluto based on images from NASA's New Horizons

Pluto's rotation period, its day, is equal to 6.387 Earth days. Like Uranus and 2 Pallas, Pluto rotates on its "side" in its orbital plane, with an axial tilt of 120°, and so its seasonal variation is extreme; at its solstices, one-fourth of its surface is in continuous daylight, whereas another fourth is in continuous darkness. The reason for this unusual orientation has been debated. Research from the University of Arizona has suggested that it may be due to the way that a body's spin will always adjust to minimize energy. This could mean a body reorienting itself to put extraneous mass near the equator and regions lacking mass tend towards the poles. This is called polar wander.

According to a paper released from the University of Arizona, this could be caused by masses of frozen nitrogen building up in shadowed areas of the dwarf planet. These masses would cause the body to reorient itself, leading to its unusual axial tilt of 120°. The buildup of nitrogen is due to Pluto's vast distance from the Sun. At the equator, temperatures can drop to −240 °C (−400.0 °F; 33.1 K), causing nitrogen to freeze as water would freeze on Earth. The same polar wandering effect seen on Pluto would be observed on Earth were the Antarctic ice sheet several times larger.

== Geology ==
=== Surface ===
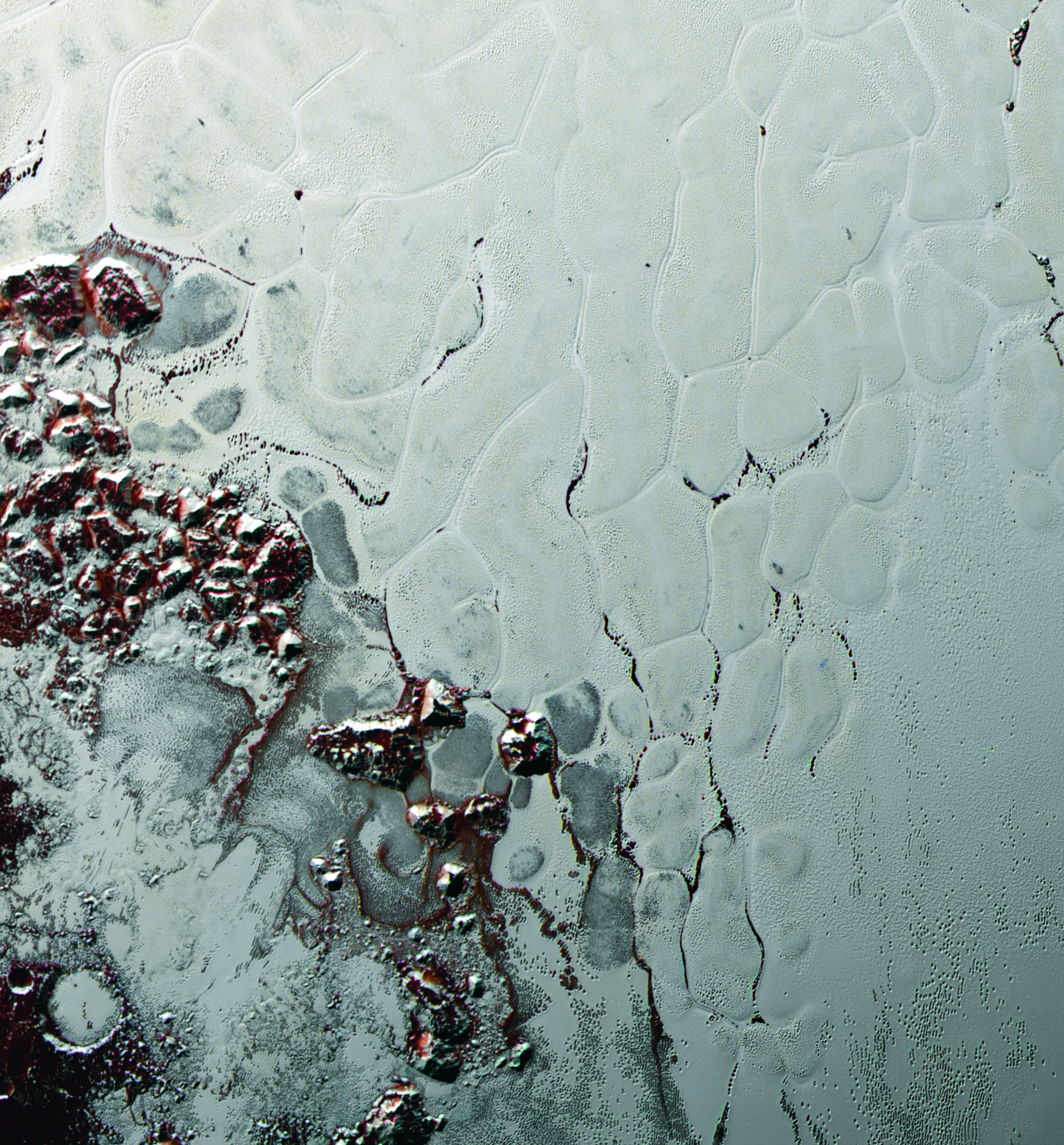
Sputnik Planitia is covered with churning nitrogen ice "cells" that are geologically young and turning over due to convection.

The plains on Pluto's surface are composed of more than 98 percent nitrogen ice, with traces of methane and carbon monoxide. Nitrogen and carbon monoxide are most abundant on the anti-Charon face of Pluto (around 180° longitude, where Tombaugh Regio's western lobe, Sputnik Planitia, is located), whereas methane is most abundant near 300° east. The mountains are made of water ice. Pluto's surface is quite varied, with large differences in topography, brightness and color.

Pluto is one of the most contrastive bodies in the Solar System, with as much contrast as Saturn's moon Iapetus. The color varies from charcoal black, to dark orange and white. Pluto's color is more similar to that of Io with slightly more orange and significantly less red than Mars. Notable geographical features include Tombaugh Regio, or the "Heart" (a large bright area on the side opposite Charon), Belton Regio, or the "Whale" (a large dark area on the trailing hemisphere), and the "Brass Knuckles" (a series of equatorial dark areas on the leading hemisphere).

Sputnik Planitia, the western lobe of the "Heart", is a 1,000 km-wide 3 km-deep impact basin partially flooded with frozen nitrogen and carbon monoxide ices, divided into polygonal cells, which are interpreted as convection cells that carry floating blocks of water ice crust and sublimation pits towards their margins; there are obvious signs of glacial flows both into and out of the basin. It has no craters that were visible to New Horizons, indicating that its surface is less than 10 million years old. Latest studies have shown that the surface has an age of 180000+90000
−40000 years. The New Horizons science team summarized initial findings as "Pluto displays a surprisingly wide variety of geological landforms, including those resulting from glaciological and surface–atmosphere interactions as well as impact, tectonic, possible cryovolcanic, and mass-wasting processes."

In Western parts of Sputnik Planitia there are fields of transverse dunes formed by the winds blowing from the center of Sputnik Planitia in the direction of surrounding mountains. The dune wavelengths are in the range of 0.4–1 km and likely consist of methane particles 200–300 μm in size.

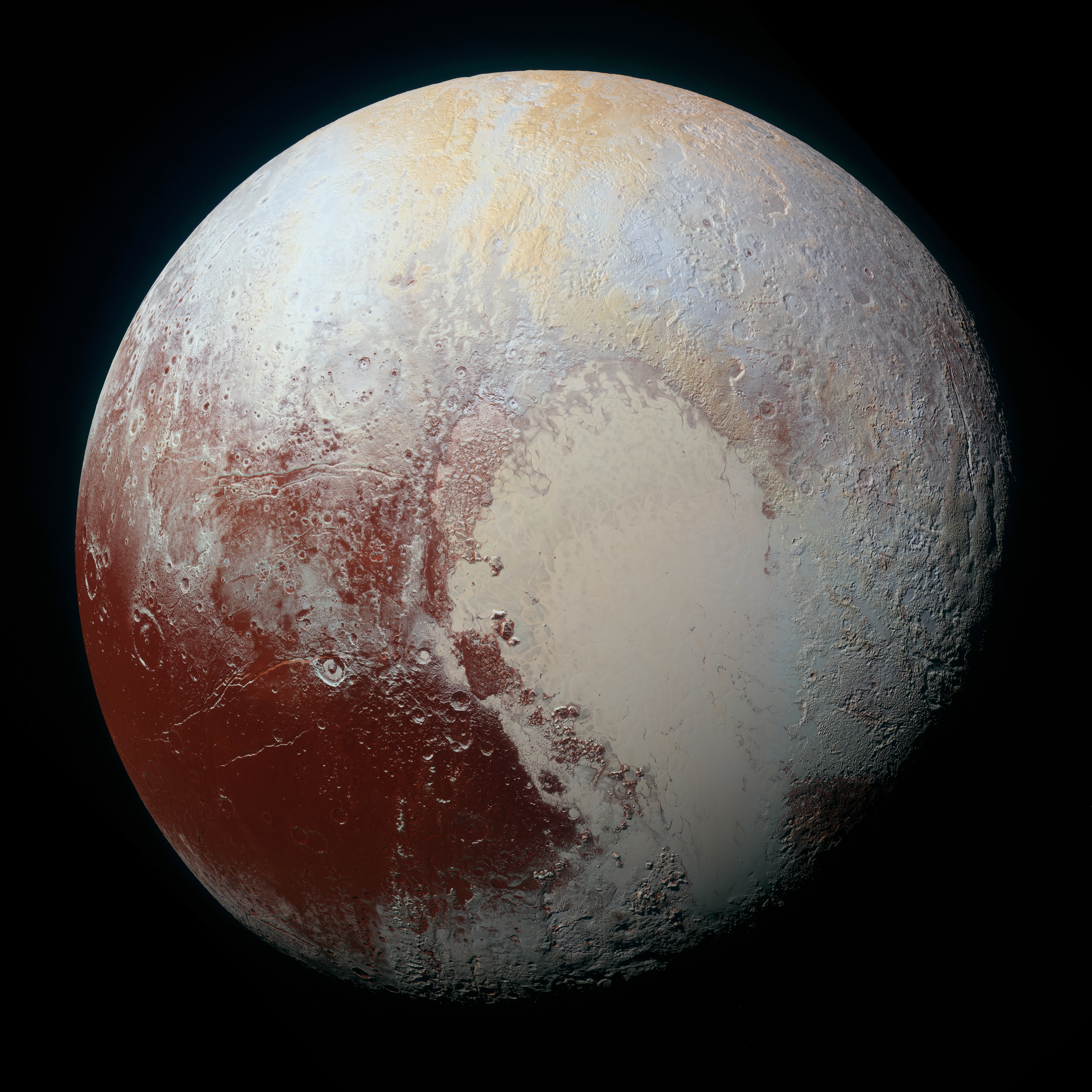
A multispectral Visual Imaging Camera image of Pluto in enhanced color to bring out differences in surface composition

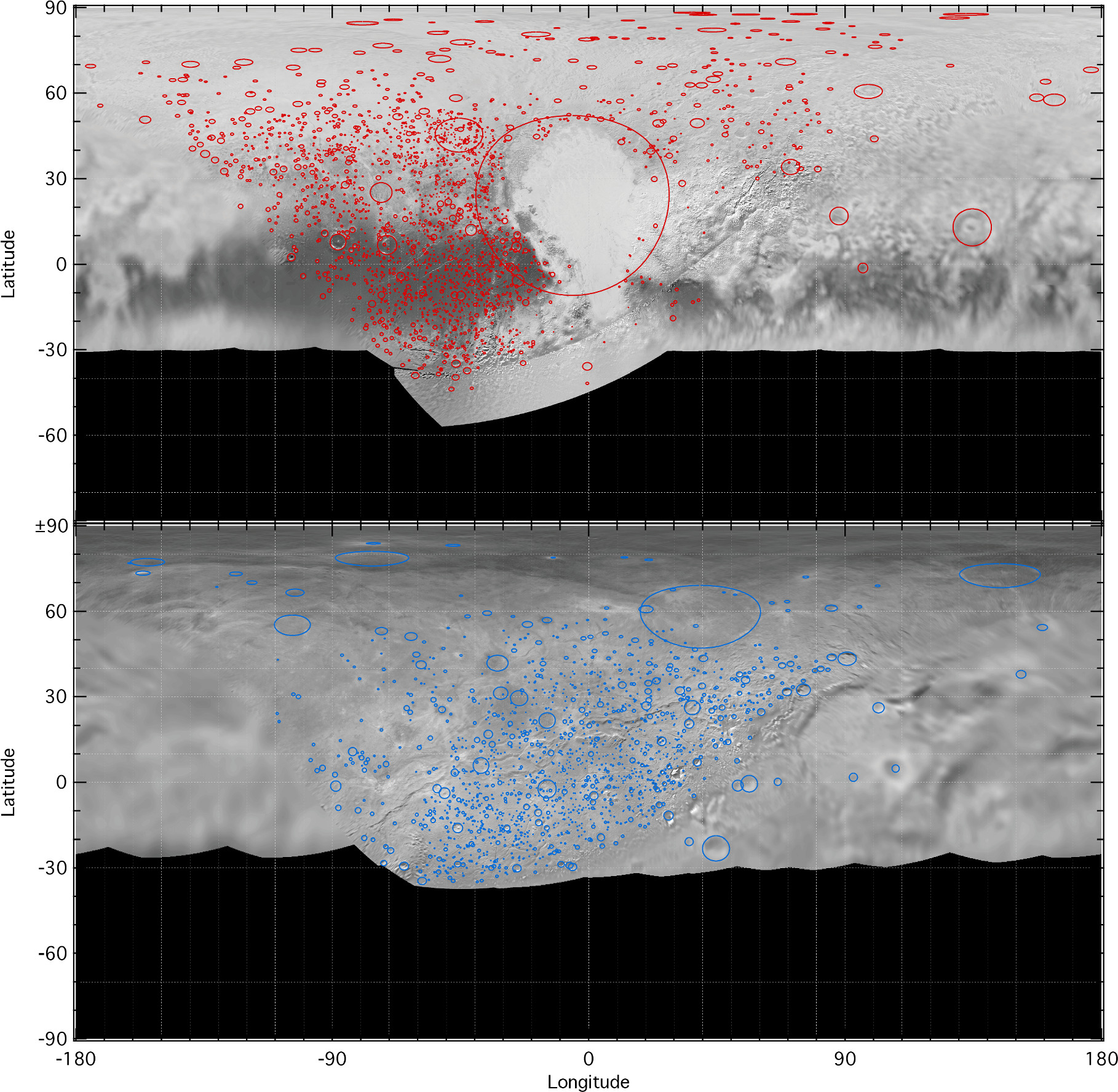
The distribution of numerous impact craters and basins on both Pluto and Charon. The variation in density (with none found in Sputnik Planitia) indicates a long history of varying geological activity. Precisely for this reason, the confidence of numerous craters on Pluto remain uncertain. The lack of craters on the left and right of each map is due to low-resolution coverage of those anti-encounter regions.

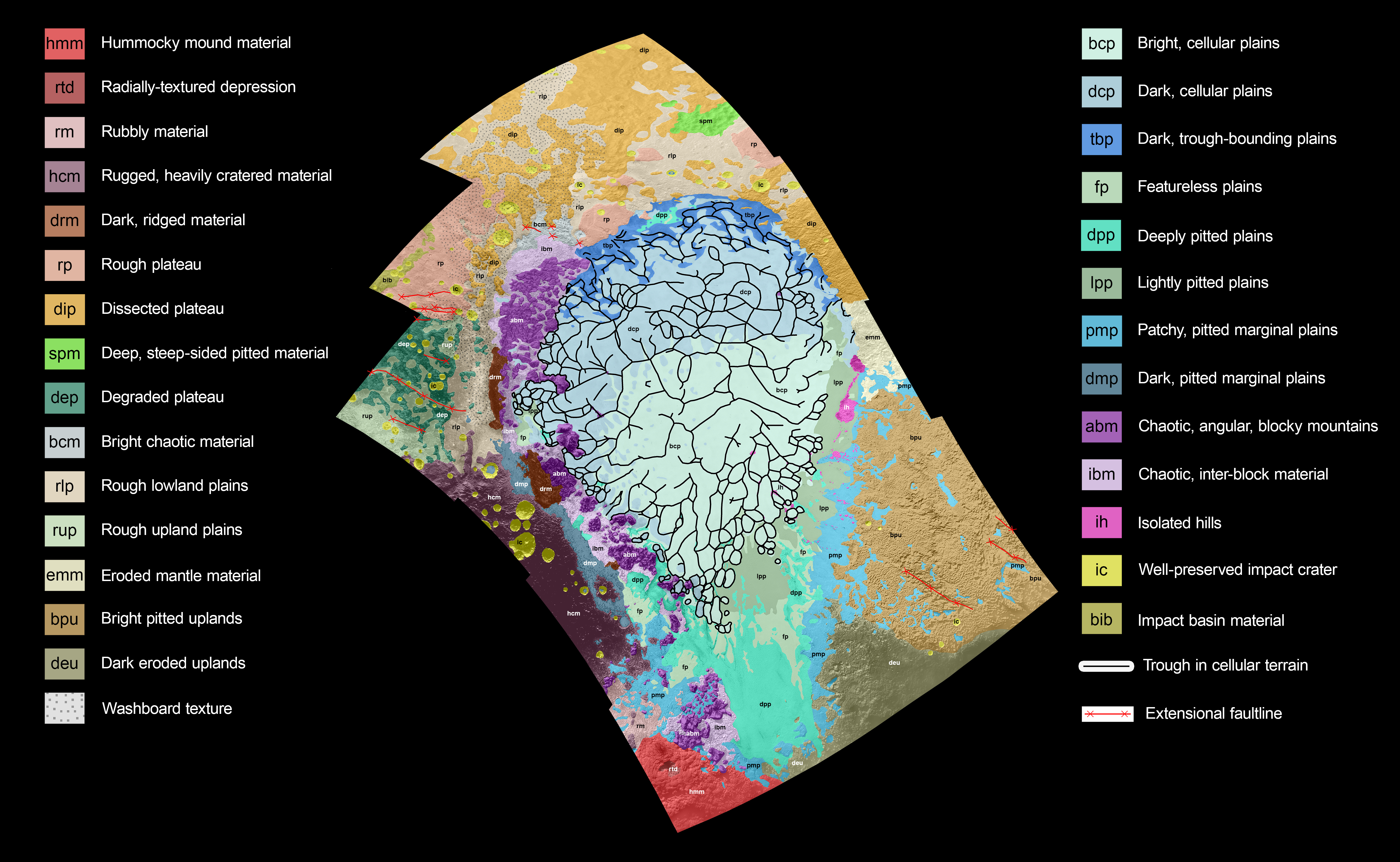
A geologic map of Sputnik Planitia and surroundings (context), with convection cell margins outlined in black

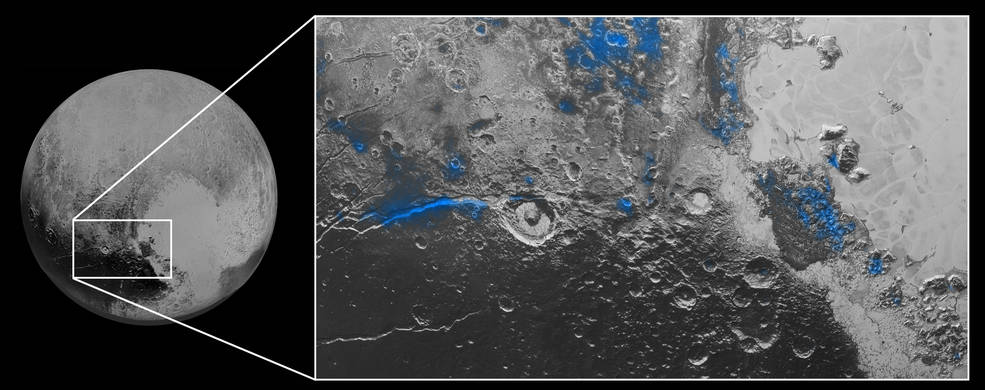
Regions where water ice has been detected (blue regions)

=== Internal structure ===
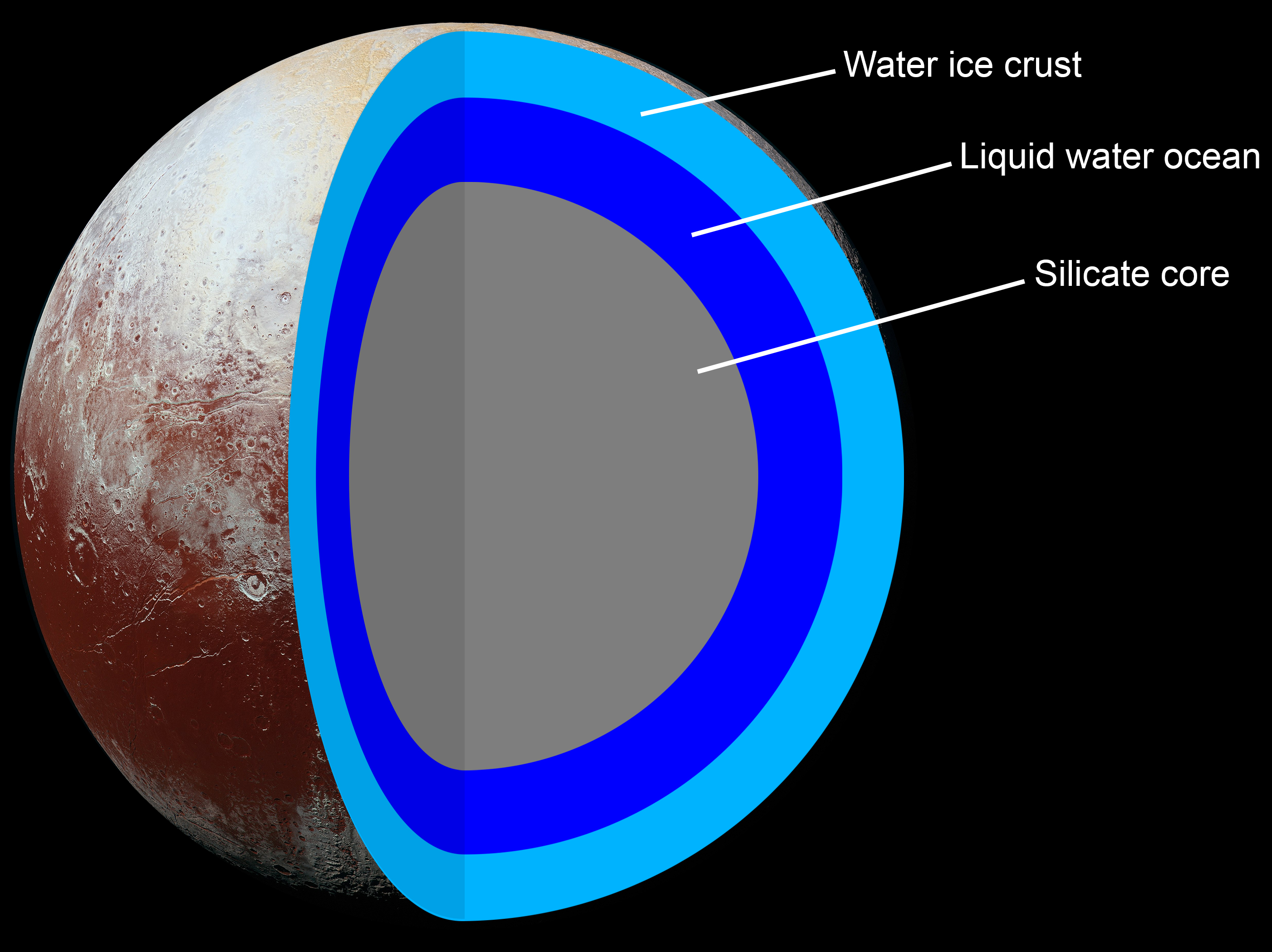
A model of the internal structure of Pluto.: Water ice crust; Liquid water ocean; Silicate core

Pluto's density is 1.853±0.004 g/cm^{3}. Because the decay of radioactive elements would eventually heat the ices enough for the rock to separate from them, scientists expect that Pluto's internal structure is differentiated, with the rocky material having settled into a dense core surrounded by a mantle of water ice. The pre–New Horizons estimate for the diameter of the core is 1700 km, 70% of Pluto's diameter.

It is possible that such heating continues, creating a subsurface ocean of liquid water 100 to 180 km thick at the core–mantle boundary. In September 2016, scientists at Brown University simulated the impact thought to have formed Sputnik Planitia, and showed that it might have been the result of liquid water upweling from below after the collision, implying the existence of a subsurface ocean at least 100 km deep.

In June 2020, astronomers reported evidence that Pluto may have had a subsurface ocean, and consequently may have been habitable, when it was first formed. In March 2022, a team of researchers proposed that the mountains Wright Mons and Piccard Mons are actually a merger of many smaller cryovolcanic domes, suggesting a source of heat on the body at levels previously thought not possible.

== Mass and size ==
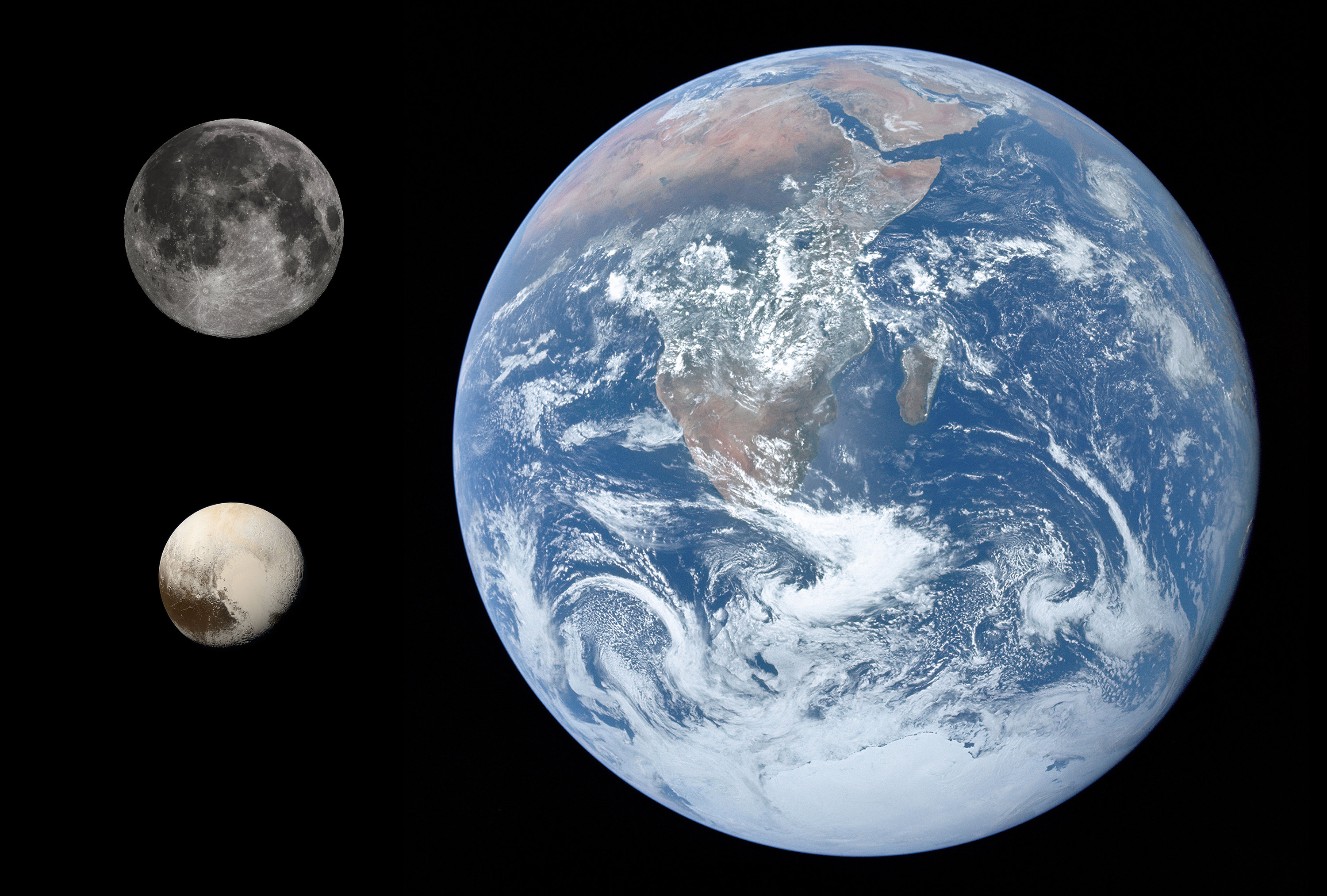
Pluto (bottom left) compared in size to the Earth and the Moon

Pluto's diameter is 2,376.6±1.6 km and its mass is (1.303±0.003)×10^{22} kg, 17.7% that of the Moon (0.22% that of Earth). Its surface area is 1.774443×10^{7} km^{2}, or slightly bigger than Russia. Its surface gravity is 0.063 g (compared to 1 g for Earth and 0.17 g for the Moon). This gives Pluto an escape velocity of 4,363.2 km per hour / 2,711.167 miles per hour (as compared to Earth's 40,270 km per hour / 25,020 miles per hour). Pluto is more than twice the diameter and a dozen times the mass of Ceres, the largest object in the asteroid belt. It is less massive than the dwarf planet Eris, a trans-Neptunian object discovered in 2005, though Pluto has a larger diameter of 2,376.6 km compared to Eris's approximate diameter of 2,326 km.

1. Triton 21.39
2. Eris 16.38
3. Pluto 13.03
4. Haumea 3.95
5. Makemake 2.69
6. Gonggong 1.75
7. Charon 1.59
8. Quaoar 1.21
The mass of Pluto compared to other dwarf planets (Eris, Haumea, Makemake, Gonggong and Quaoar, plus Pluto's moon Charon and the former dwarf planet Triton (Neptune I). The unit of mass is ×10^{21} kg.

With less than 0.2 lunar masses, Pluto is much less massive than the terrestrial planets, and also less massive than seven moons: Ganymede, Titan, Callisto, Io, the Moon, Europa, and Triton. The discovery of Pluto's satellite Charon in 1978 enabled a determination of the mass of the Pluto–Charon system by application of Newton's formulation of Kepler's third law. Observations of Pluto in occultation with Charon allowed scientists to establish Pluto's diameter more accurately, whereas the invention of adaptive optics allowed them to determine its shape more accurately.

Determinations of Pluto's size have been complicated by its atmosphere and hydrocarbon haze. In March 2014, Lellouch, de Bergh et al. published findings regarding methane mixing ratios in Pluto's atmosphere consistent with a Plutonian diameter greater than 2,360 km, with a "best guess" of 2,368 km. On July 13, 2015, images from NASA's New Horizons mission Long Range Reconnaissance Imager (LORRI), along with data from the other instruments, determined Pluto's diameter to be 2,370 km (1,473 mi), which was later revised to be 2,372 km (1,474 mi) on July 24, and later to 2374±8 km. Using radio occultation data from the New Horizons Radio Science Experiment (REX), the diameter was found to be 2,376.6±1.6 km.

== Atmosphere ==
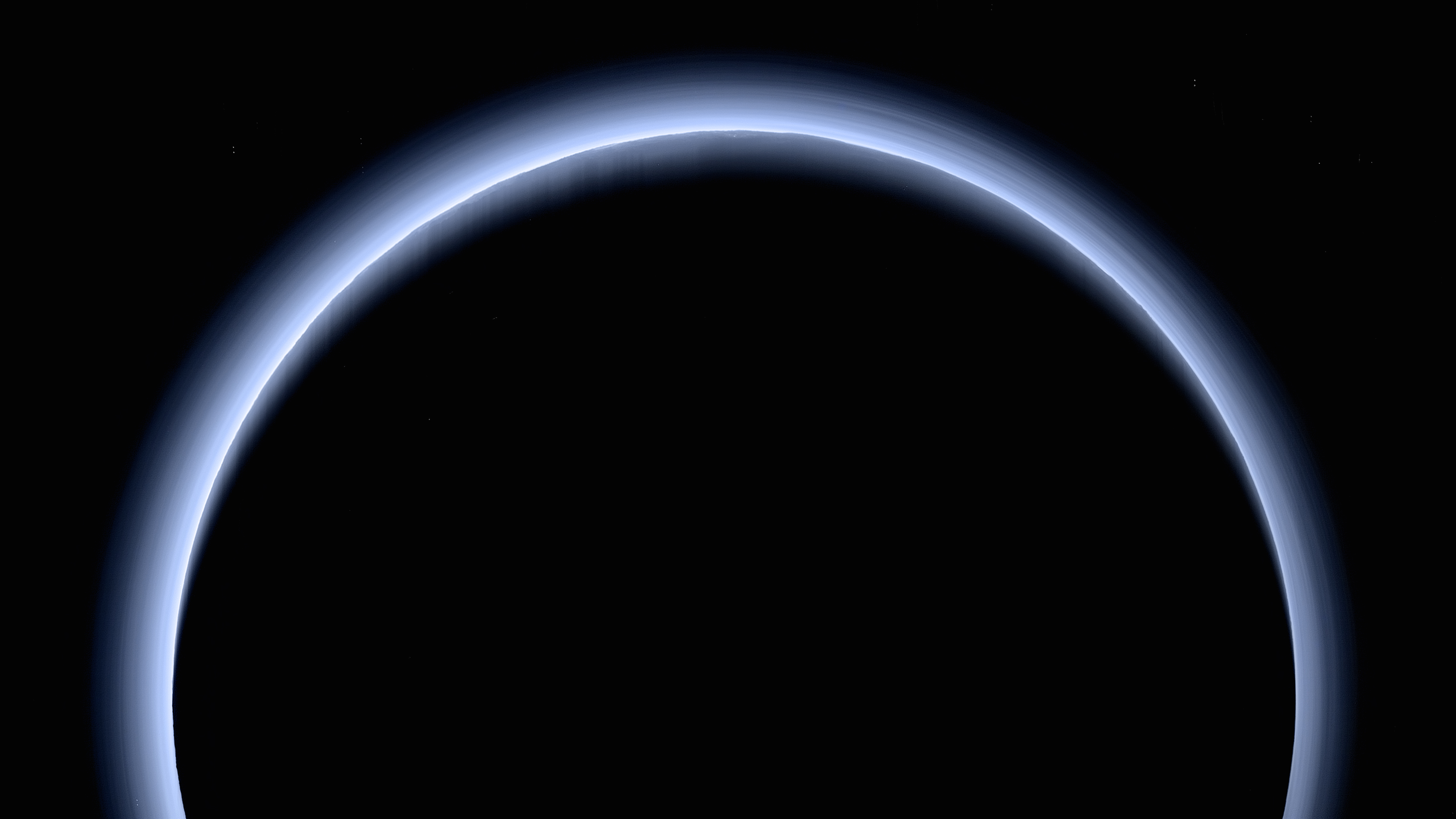
A near-true-color image taken by New Horizons after its flyby. Numerous layers of blue haze float in Pluto's atmosphere. Along and near the limb, mountains and their shadows are visible.

Pluto has a tenuous atmosphere consisting of nitrogen (N_{2}), methane (CH_{4}), and carbon monoxide (CO), which are in equilibrium with their ices on Pluto's surface. According to the measurements by New Horizons, the surface pressure is about 1 Pa (10 μbar), roughly one million to 100,000 times less than Earth's atmospheric pressure. It was initially thought that, as Pluto moves away from the Sun, its atmosphere should gradually freeze onto the surface; studies of New Horizons data and ground-based occultations show that Pluto's atmospheric density increases, and that it likely remains gaseous throughout Pluto's orbit.

New Horizons observations showed that atmospheric escape of nitrogen to be 10,000 times less than expected. Alan Stern has contended that even a small increase in Pluto's surface temperature can lead to exponential increases in Pluto's atmospheric density; from 18 hPa to as much as 280 hPa (three times that of Mars to a quarter that of the Earth). At such densities, nitrogen could flow across the surface as liquid. Just like sweat cools the body as it evaporates from the skin, the sublimation of Pluto's atmosphere cools its surface. Pluto has no or almost no troposphere; observations by New Horizons suggest only a thin tropospheric boundary layer. Its thickness in the place of measurement was 4 km, and the temperature was 37±3 K. The layer is not continuous.

In July 2019, an occultation by Pluto showed that its atmospheric pressure, against expectations, had fallen by 20% since 2016. In 2021, astronomers at the Southwest Research Institute confirmed the result using data from an occultation in 2018, which showed that light was appearing less gradually from behind Pluto's disc, indicating a thinning atmosphere. However, a 2026 study of ten occultations from 2017 to 2023 showed the pressure actually stayed the same between 2015 and 2021 before dropping in 2022. The atmosphere pressure at 1275 km decreased 7%±6%, and it dropped 16%±2% for pressure at 1215 km when including haze.

The presence of methane, a powerful greenhouse gas, in Pluto's atmosphere creates a temperature inversion, with the average temperature of its atmosphere tens of degrees warmer than its surface, though observations by New Horizons have revealed Pluto's upper atmosphere to be far colder than expected (70 K, as opposed to about 100 K). Pluto's atmosphere is divided into roughly 20 regularly spaced haze layers up to 150 km high, thought to be the result of pressure waves created by airflow across Pluto's mountains.

== Natural satellites ==
An oblique view of the Pluto–Charon system, showing that Pluto orbits a point outside itself. The two bodies are mutually tidally locked.

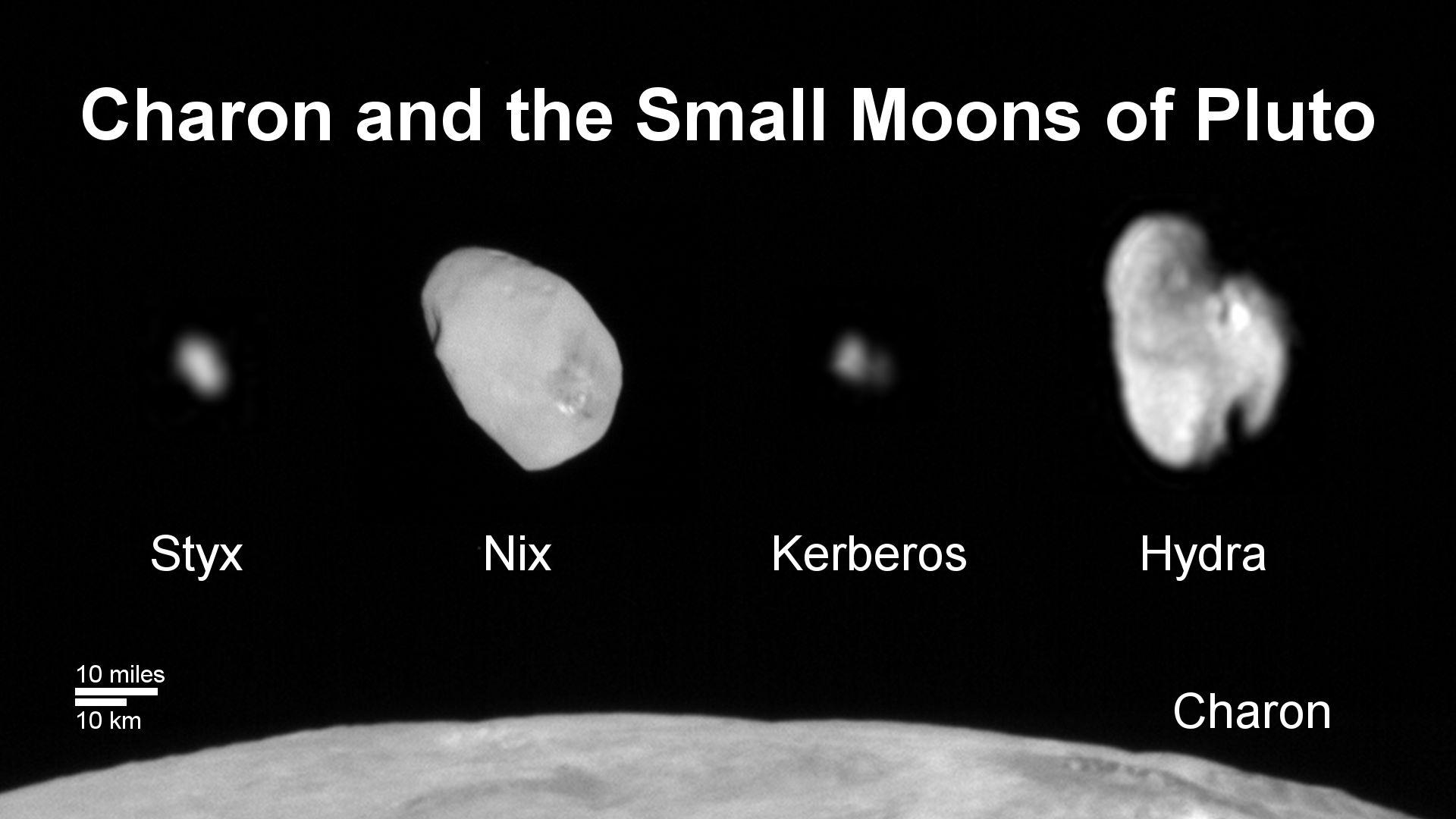
Five known moons of Pluto to scale

Pluto has five known natural satellites. The largest and closest to Pluto is Charon. First identified in 1978 by astronomer James Christy, Charon is the only moon of Pluto that may be in hydrostatic equilibrium. Charon's mass is sufficient to cause the barycenter of the Pluto–Charon system to be outside Pluto. Beyond Charon there are four much smaller circumbinary moons. In order of distance from Pluto they are Styx, Nix, Kerberos, and Hydra. Nix and Hydra were both discovered in 2005, Kerberos was discovered in 2011, and Styx was discovered in 2012. The satellites' orbits are circular (eccentricity < 0.006) and coplanar with Pluto's equator (inclination < 1°), and therefore tilted approximately 120° relative to Pluto's orbit. The Plutonian system is highly compact: the five known satellites orbit within the inner 3% of the region where prograde orbits would be stable.

The Pluto–Charon system is one of the few in the Solar System whose barycenter lies outside the primary body; the Patroclus–Menoetius and Antiope systems are some smaller examples, and the Sun–Jupiter system is the only larger one. The similarity in size of Charon and Pluto has prompted some astronomers to call it a double dwarf planet. The system is also unusual among planetary systems in that each is tidally locked to the other, which means that Pluto and Charon always have the same hemisphere facing each other — a property confirmed to be shared by only one other known system, Eris and Dysnomia, with Orcus and Vanth being possible candidates. From any position on either body, the other is always at the same position in the sky, or always obscured. This also means that the rotation period of each is equal to the time it takes the entire system to rotate around its barycenter.

Pluto's moons are hypothesized to have been formed by a collision between Pluto and a similar-sized body, early in the history of the Solar System. The collision released material that consolidated into the moons around Pluto.

=== Quasi-satellite ===
In 2012, it was calculated that 15810 Arawn could be a quasi-satellite of Pluto, a specific type of co-orbital configuration. According to the calculations, the object would be a quasi-satellite of Pluto for about 350,000 years out of every two-million-year period. Measurements made by the New Horizons spacecraft in 2015 made it possible to calculate the orbit of Arawn more accurately, and confirmed the earlier ones. However, it is not agreed upon among astronomers whether Arawn should be classified as a quasi-satellite of Pluto based on its orbital dynamics, since its orbit is primarily controlled by Neptune with only occasional perturbations by Pluto.

== Origin ==
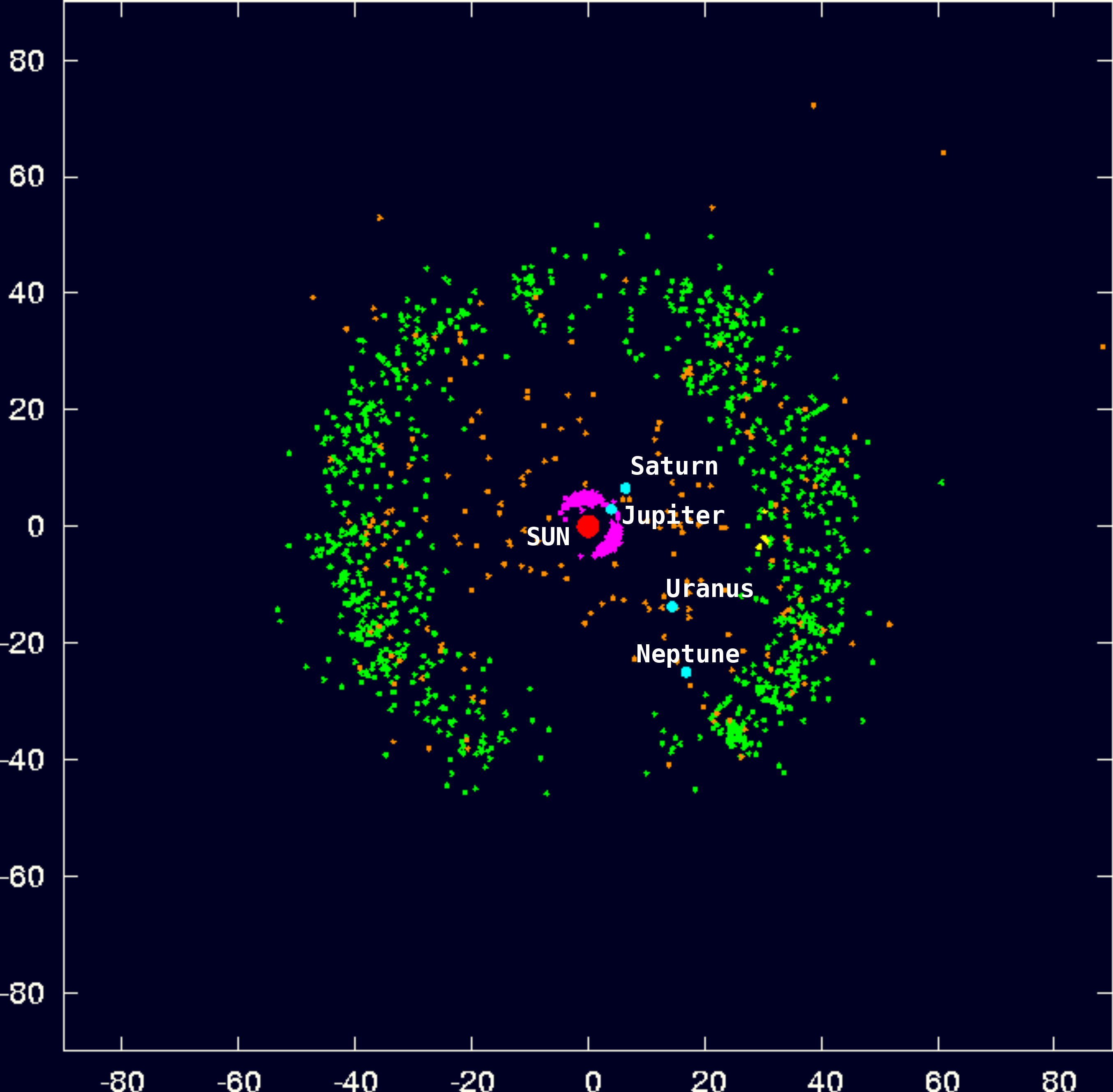
Plot of the known Kuiper belt objects, set against the four giant planets

Pluto's origin and identity had long puzzled astronomers. One early hypothesis was that Pluto was an escaped moon of Neptune knocked out of orbit by Neptune's largest moon, Triton. This idea was eventually rejected after dynamical studies showed it to be impossible because Pluto never approaches Neptune in its orbit.

Pluto's true place in the Solar System began to reveal itself only in 1992, when astronomers began to find small icy objects beyond Neptune that were similar to Pluto not only in orbit but also in size and composition. This trans-Neptunian population is thought to be the source of many short-period comets. Pluto is the largest member of the Kuiper belt, (Note: The dwarf planet Eris is roughly the same size as Pluto, about 2330 km; Eris is 28% more massive than Pluto. Eris is a scattered-disc object, often considered a distinct population from Kuiper-belt objects like Pluto; Pluto is the largest body in the Kuiper belt proper, which excludes the scattered-disc objects.) a stable belt of objects located between 30 and 50 AU from the Sun. As of 2011, surveys of the Kuiper belt to magnitude 21 were nearly complete and any remaining Pluto-sized objects are expected to be beyond 100 AU from the Sun.

Like other Kuiper-belt objects (KBOs), Pluto shares features with comets; for example, the solar wind is gradually blowing Pluto's surface into space. It has been claimed that if Pluto were placed as near to the Sun as Earth, it would develop a tail, as comets do. This claim has been disputed with the argument that Pluto's escape velocity is too high for this to happen. It has been proposed that Pluto may have formed as a result of the agglomeration of numerous comets and Kuiper-belt objects.

Though Pluto is the largest Kuiper belt object discovered, Neptune's moon Triton, which is larger than Pluto, is similar to it both geologically and atmospherically, and is thought to be a captured Kuiper belt object. Eris (see above) is about the same size as Pluto (though more massive) but is not strictly considered a member of the Kuiper belt population. Rather, it is considered a member of a linked population called the scattered disc.

Like other members of the Kuiper belt, Pluto is thought to be a residual planetesimal; a component of the original protoplanetary disc around the Sun that failed to fully coalesce into a full-fledged planet. Most astronomers agree that Pluto owes its position to a sudden migration undergone by Neptune early in the Solar System's formation. As Neptune migrated outward, it approached the objects in the proto-Kuiper belt, setting one in orbit around itself (Triton), locking others into resonances, and knocking others into chaotic orbits. The objects in the scattered disc, a dynamically unstable region overlapping the Kuiper belt, are thought to have been placed in their positions by interactions with Neptune's migrating resonances.

A 2004 computer model by Alessandro Morbidelli of the Observatoire de la Côte d'Azur in Nice suggested that the migration of Neptune into the Kuiper belt may have been triggered by the formation of a 1:2 resonance between Jupiter and Saturn, which created a gravitational push that propelled both Uranus and Neptune into higher orbits and caused them to switch places, ultimately doubling Neptune's distance from the Sun. The resultant expulsion of objects from the proto-Kuiper belt could also explain the Late Heavy Bombardment 600 million years after the Solar System's formation and the origin of the Jupiter trojans. It is possible that Pluto had a near-circular orbit about 33 AU from the Sun before Neptune's migration perturbed it into a resonant capture. The Nice model requires that there were about a thousand Pluto-sized bodies in the original planetesimal disk, which included Triton and Eris.

== Observation and exploration ==
=== Observation ===
Computer-generated rotating image of Pluto based on observations by the Hubble Space Telescope in 2002–2003

Pluto's distance from Earth makes its in-depth study and exploration difficult. Pluto's visual apparent magnitude averages 15.1, brightening to 13.65 at perihelion. To see it, a telescope is required; around 30 cm (12 in) aperture being desirable. It looks star-like and without a visible disk even in large telescopes, because its angular diameter is maximum 0.11".

The earliest maps of Pluto, made in the late 1980s, were brightness maps created from close observations of eclipses by its largest moon, Charon. Observations were made of the change in the total average brightness of the Pluto–Charon system during the eclipses. For example, eclipsing a bright spot on Pluto makes a bigger total brightness change than eclipsing a dark spot. Computer processing of many such observations can be used to create a brightness map. This method can also track changes in brightness over time.

Better maps were produced from images taken by the Hubble Space Telescope (HST), which offered higher resolution, and showed considerably more detail, resolving variations several hundred kilometers across, including polar regions and large bright spots. These maps were produced by complex computer processing, which finds the best-fit projected maps for the few pixels of the Hubble images. These remained the most detailed maps of Pluto until the flyby of New Horizons in July 2015, because the two cameras on the HST used for these maps were no longer in service.

=== Exploration ===
Pluto and Charon seen orbiting each other by New Horizons

Rotation animation of Pluto, compiled from LORRI images, from 28 May to 3 June.

The New Horizons spacecraft, which flew by Pluto in July 2015, is the first and so far only attempt to explore Pluto directly. Launched in 2006, it captured its first (distant) images of Pluto in late September 2006 during a test of the Long Range Reconnaissance Imager. The images, taken from a distance of approximately 4.2 billion kilometers, confirmed the spacecraft's ability to track distant targets, critical for maneuvering toward Pluto and other Kuiper belt objects. In early 2007, the craft made use of a gravity assist from Jupiter.

New Horizons made its closest approach to Pluto on July 14, 2015, after a 3,462-day journey across the Solar System. Scientific observations of Pluto began five months before the closest approach and continued for at least a month after the encounter. Observations were conducted using a remote sensing package that included imaging instruments and a radio science investigation tool, as well as spectroscopic and other experiments. The scientific goals of New Horizons were to characterize the global geology and morphology of Pluto and its moon Charon, map their surface composition, and analyze Pluto's neutral atmosphere and its escape rate. On October 25, 2016, at 05:48 pm ET, the last bit of data (of a total of 50 billion bits of data; or 6.25 gigabytes) was received from New Horizons from its close encounter with Pluto.

Since the New Horizons flyby, scientists have advocated for an orbiter mission that would return to Pluto to fulfill new science objectives. They include mapping the surface at 9.1 m (30 ft) per pixel, observations of Pluto's smaller satellites, observations of how Pluto changes as it rotates on its axis, investigations of a possible subsurface ocean, and topographic mapping of Pluto's regions that are covered in long-term darkness due to its axial tilt. The last objective could be accomplished using laser pulses to generate a complete topographic map of Pluto.

New Horizons principal investigator Alan Stern has advocated for a Cassini-style orbiter that would launch around 2030 (the 100th anniversary of Pluto's discovery) and use Charon's gravity to adjust its orbit as needed to fulfill science objectives after arriving at the Pluto system. The orbiter could then use Charon's gravity to leave the Pluto system and study more KBOs after all Pluto science objectives are completed. A conceptual study funded by the NASA Innovative Advanced Concepts (NIAC) program describes a fusion-enabled Pluto orbiter and lander based on the Princeton field-reversed configuration reactor.

New Horizons imaged all of Pluto's northern hemisphere, and the equatorial regions down to about 30° South. Higher southern latitudes have only been observed, at very low resolution, from Earth. Images from the Hubble Space Telescope in 1996 cover 85% of Pluto and show large albedo features down to about 75° South. This is enough to show the extent of the temperate-zone maculae. Later images had slightly better resolution, due to minor improvements in Hubble instrumentation. The equatorial region of the sub-Charon hemisphere of Pluto has only been imaged at low resolution, as New Horizons made its closest approach to the anti-Charon hemisphere.

Some albedo variations in the higher southern latitudes could be detected by New Horizons using Charon-shine (light reflected off Charon). The south polar region seems to be darker than the north polar region, but there is a high-albedo region in the southern hemisphere that may be a regional nitrogen or methane ice deposit.

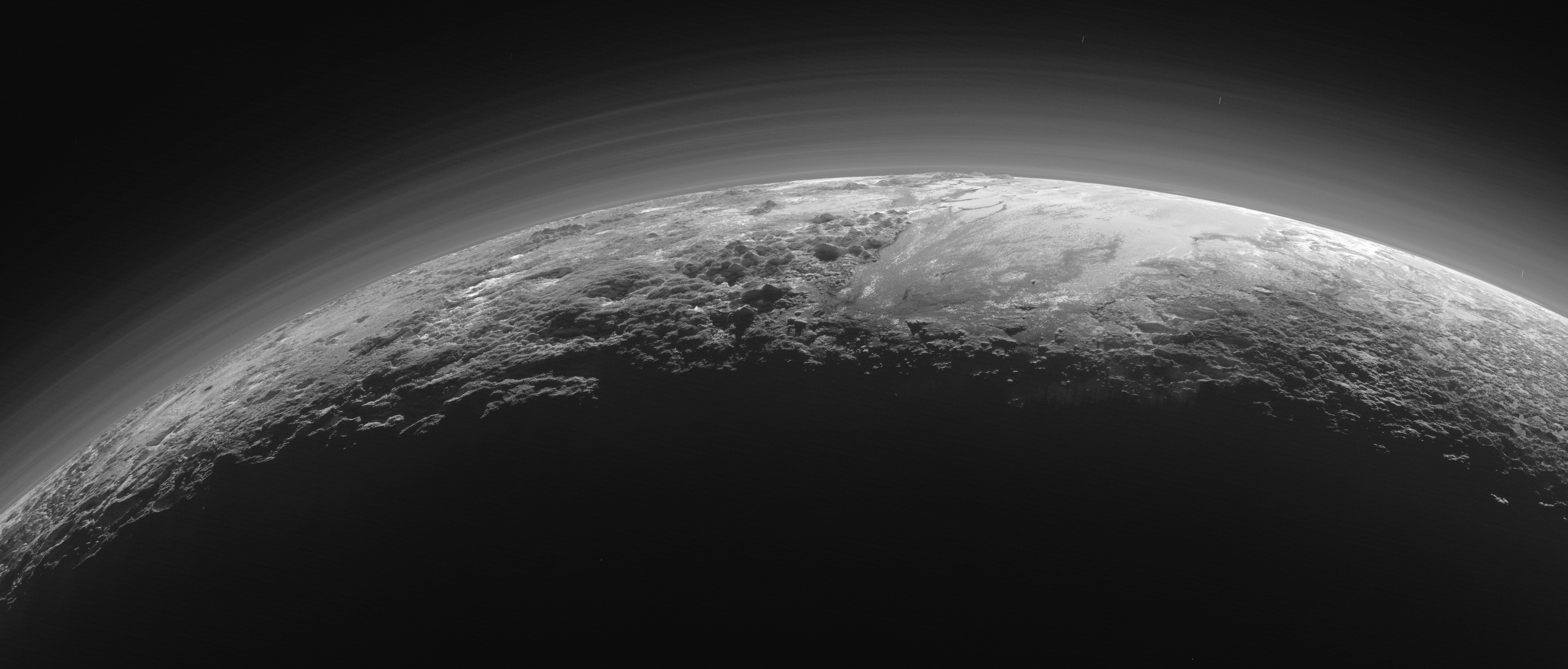
A panoramic view of Pluto's icy mountains and flat ice plains. Imaged by New Horizons, 15 minutes after its closest approach to Pluto. Distinct haze layers in Pluto's atmosphere can be seen backlit by the Sun.

== See also ==
- How I Killed Pluto and Why It Had It Coming
- List of geological features on Pluto
- Pluto in astrology
- Pluto in fiction
- Statistics of planets in the Solar System
