= Lyons-Decatur Northeast Schools =

School district in Nebraska, United States

Address
- 400 South 5th Street Lyons, Nebraska, 68038; United States

District information
- Motto: "Empower All Students to Achieve"
- Grades: PK-12
- Superintendent: Fred Hansen

Students and staff
- Enrollment: 292 (as of 2007-08)
- Staff: 22.8 (FTE) (as of 2007-08)
- Student–teacher ratio: 10.6 (as of 2007-08)
- Athletic conference: East Husker
- District mascot: Cougar
- Colors: Maroon, gold, and white

Other information
- Website: www.lyonsdecaturschools.org

Lyons-Decatur Northeast Schools is a public school district in Lyons, Nebraska, United States. It is a consolidated school encompassing the Communities of Decatur and Lyons, which are located in Burt County in northeast Nebraska. It is a class D1 school. Its mascot is the Cougar.

== History ==
The Lyons-Decatur Northeast Schools was created through a merger of the Lyons and Decatur districts in 1984.

The district implemented a 1-to-1 laptop initiative in 2008. All students in classes 10-12 had their own Macintosh laptops as of the 2009–10 school year; in the 2010-11 year this was expanded to all students in grades 9–12.

== Boundary ==
The largest share of the district is in Burt County, where it includes Decatur and Lyons. It has all of Logan Township, much of Decatur and Everett townships, and parts of Bell Creek, Oakland, Quinnebaugh, and Silver Creek townships.

A portion of the district lies in Cuming County, taking sections of Garfield Township and Neligh Township.

A portion of the district lies in Thurston County. There, it covers most of Anderson Township and portions of Dawes Township.

== Campus ==
The K-12 school location in Lyons was built in 1963, with additions in 1978 and 1996.

== Extracurricular activities ==
Student groups and activities include drama, FBLA, FFA, music, speech, student council, and yearbook.

The school's teams, known as the Lyons-Decatur Cougars, compete in Nebraska School Activities Association size classification D in the East Husker conference. Teams are fielded in basketball, football, golf, track, and volleyball.
