= Arizona (disambiguation) =

Arizona is a southwestern state in the United States of America.

Arizona may also refer to:

== Places ==
- Arizona, San Luis, Argentina
- Arizona, Manitoba, Canada, a locality
- Arizona, Atlántida, Honduras, a municipality
- Arizona City, Arizona, United States census-designated place
- Arizona, Louisiana, United States, an unincorporated community
- Arizona, Nebraska, United States, an unincorporated community
- Arizona Township, Burt County, Nebraska, United States
- 793 Arizona, an asteroid
- Arizona Market, a market in Brčko District, Bosnia and Herzegovina

== Former territorial designations ==
- Arizona Department, a department of the Second Mexican Empire, immediately south of the territory, 1863–1867
- Arizona Territory, a territory of the Confederate States, 1861–1865
- Arizona Territory, a territory of the United States, 1863–1912

== Ships ==
- USS Arizona (1858), launched 1859, served in the American Civil War
- USS Arizona (1869), a steam frigate launched in 1865
- USS Arizona (BB-39), a battleship sunk in the attack on Pearl Harbor
- SS Arizona, a British passenger liner and holder of the eastbound Atlantic Record in 1879

== Films ==
- Arizona (1913 film), silent film starring Robert Broderick
- Arizona (1918 film), silent film featuring Douglas Fairbanks
- Arizona (1931 film), starring John Wayne
- Arizona (1940 film), starring Jean Arthur and William Holden
- Arizona (2018 film), starring Danny McBride

== Theatre ==
- Arizona (play), an 1899 play written by Augustus Thomas

== Music ==
- Arizona (American band) (stylized as A R I Z O N A), American rock and electropop band from New Jersey
- Arizona (British band), Eurodance musical project from England
- "Arizona" (song), a 1970 song by Mark Lindsay
- "Arizona", a 1981 country and western hit by Rex Allen and Rex Allen, Jr. used as the Alternate State Anthem of Arizona; see state songs of Arizona
- "Arizona", a song from the 1982 album Blackout by Scorpions
- "Arizona", a track on the 2007 album Because of the Times by Kings of Leon
- "Arizona", a song from the 2008 album Hold On Tight by Hey Monday
- "Arizona", a song from the 2009 album The New Way Out by Rustic Overtones
- "Arizona", a song from the 2009 album Reality Killed the Video Star by Robbie Williams

== People ==
- Arizona Barker (1873–1935), American criminal
- Arizona Brandy, Filipino drag queen
- Arizona John Burke (1842–1917), American publicist, manager, and press agent
- Arizona Charlie (1860–1932), American showman and sharpshooter
- Arizona Dranes (1889/1891–1963), American singer
- Arizona Fleming (1884–1976), American business owner
- Arizona Muse (born 1988), American model
- Arizona Reid (born 1986), Israeli National League basketball player
- Arizona Cleaver Stemons (1898–1980), American social worker
- Arizona Zervas (born 1995), American musician

== Other ==
- Arizona (snake), a genus of snakes
- Arizona (Lucky Luke), a Lucky Luke comic
- Talbot Arizona, a car model based on the Peugeot 309
- Arizona, one of the main characters of the video game Them's Fightin' Herds.
- AriZona Beverage Company, American producer of ready-to-drink beverages

== See also ==
- Arizona Beverage Company, a producer of tea drinks in the United States, the United Kingdom, Canada and Mexico
- University of Arizona, a public research university located in Tucson, Arizona, United States
  - Arizona Wildcats, the athletic program of the University of Arizona
