= Riverside Township, Illinois =

Riverside Township, Illinois may refer to:

- Riverside Township, Adams County, Illinois
- Riverside Township, Cook County, Illinois

== See also ==
- Riverside Township (disambiguation)
