= Riverside Township, Nebraska =

Riverside Township, Nebraska may refer to the following places:

- Riverside Township, Burt County, Nebraska
- Riverside Township, Gage County, Nebraska

See also

- Riverside Township (disambiguation)
- Riverdale Township, Buffalo County, Nebraska
