= Craig Township =

Craig Township may refer to one of the following places within the United States:

- Craig Township, Switzerland County, Indiana
- Craig Township, Burt County, Nebraska
