= North Quincy =

North Quincy may refer to one of the following places:

- North Quincy (Quincy, Massachusetts) a neighborhood in Quincy, Massachusetts.
  - North Quincy station a station on the Red line subway
  - North Quincy High School
- North Quincy, Illinois an unincorporated community located north of Quincy, Illinois
