= Jan Millsapps =

American novelist and filmmaker (born 1950)

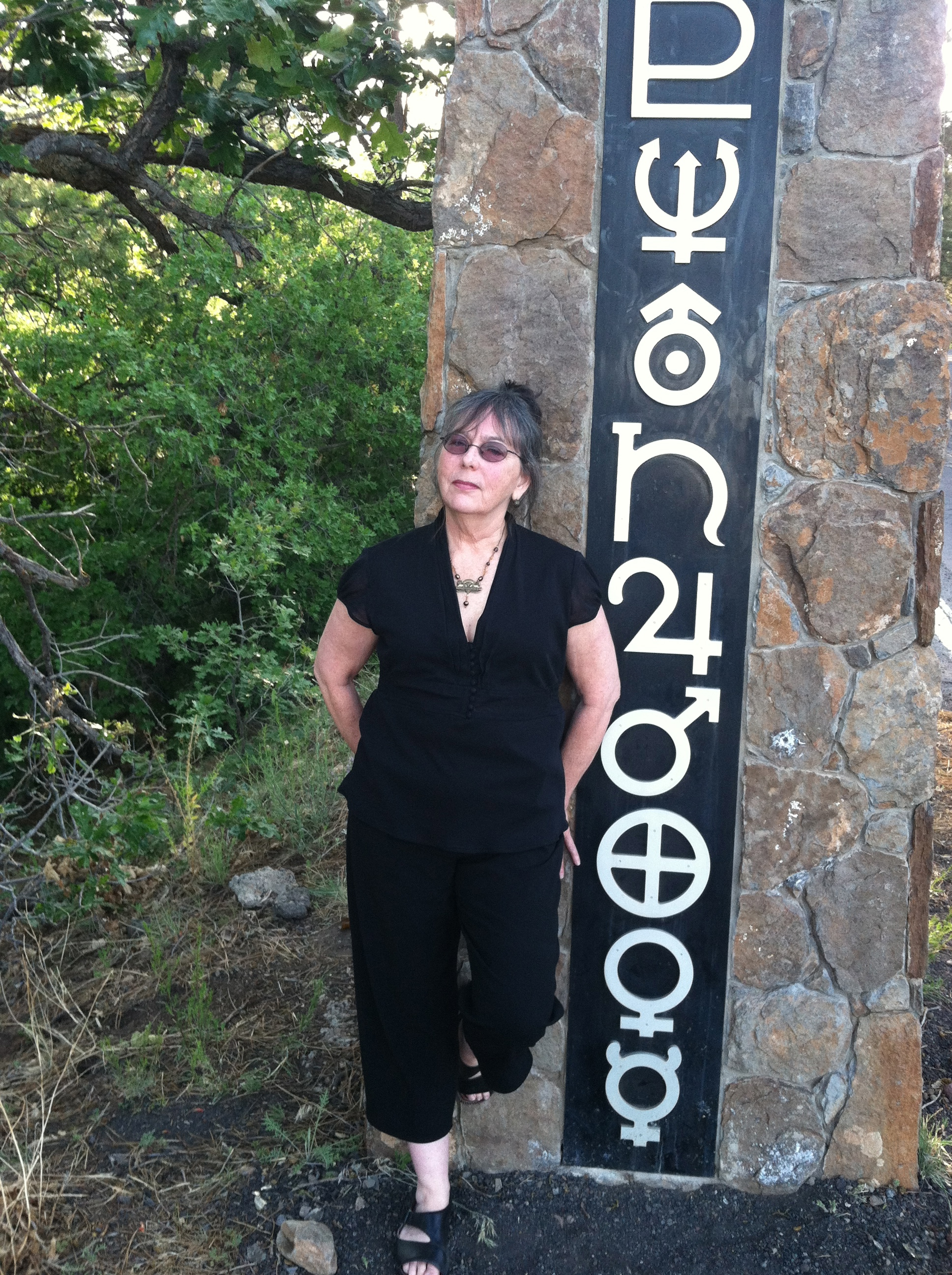
- Millsapps at Lowell Observatory in Flagstaff, Arizona on June 4, 2012
- Born: February 26, 1950 (age 76) Concord, North Carolina, U.S.
- Occupation: Filmmaker; writer
- Education: University of North Carolina at Charlotte (BA); Winthrop University (MA); University of South Carolina (PhD)
- Genre: Fiction
- Spouse: Phill Sawyer

Website
- janmillsapps.com

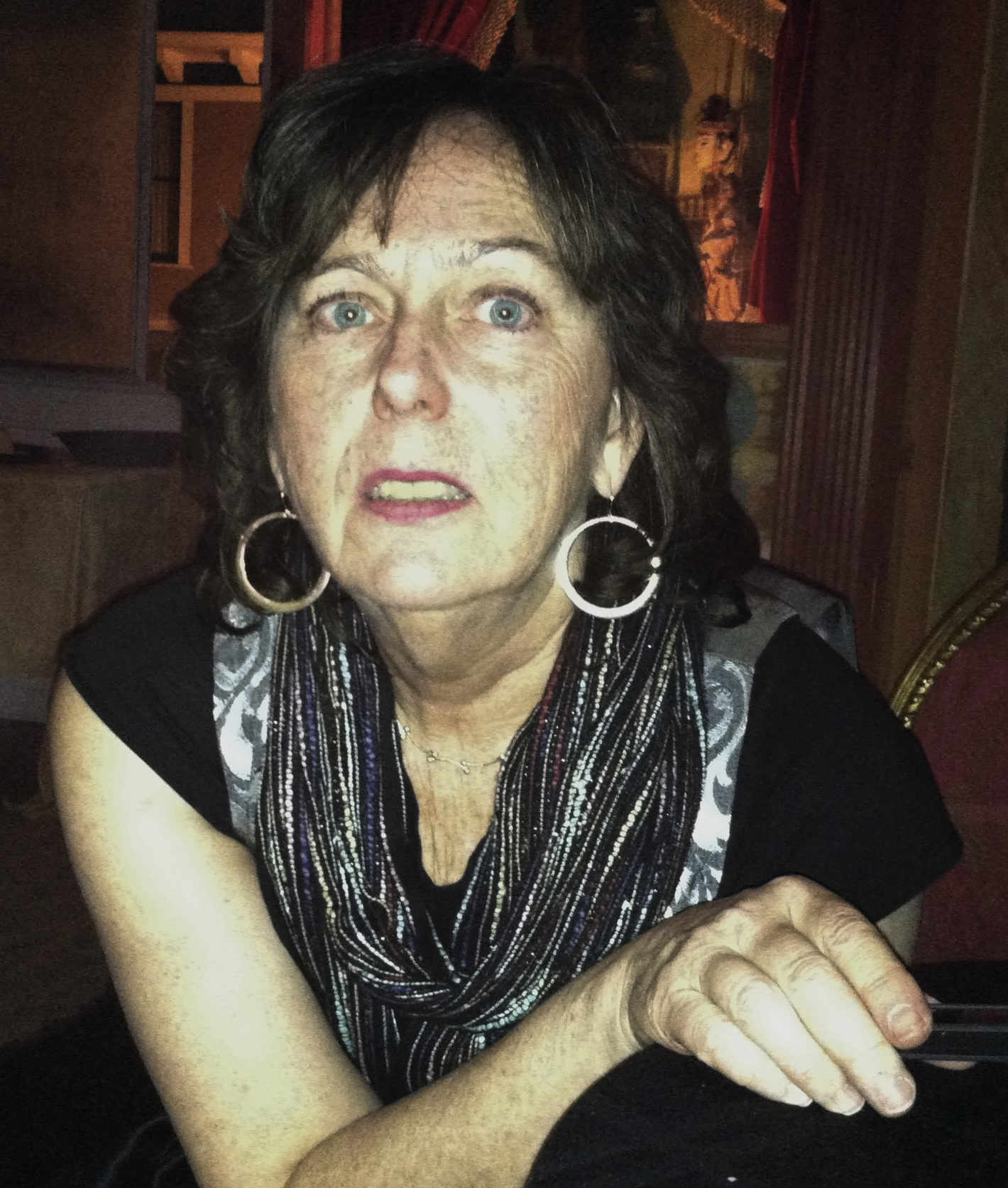
Jan Millsapps in VIP lounge at Jefferson Starship event in Mill Valley, CA, on March 21, 2011

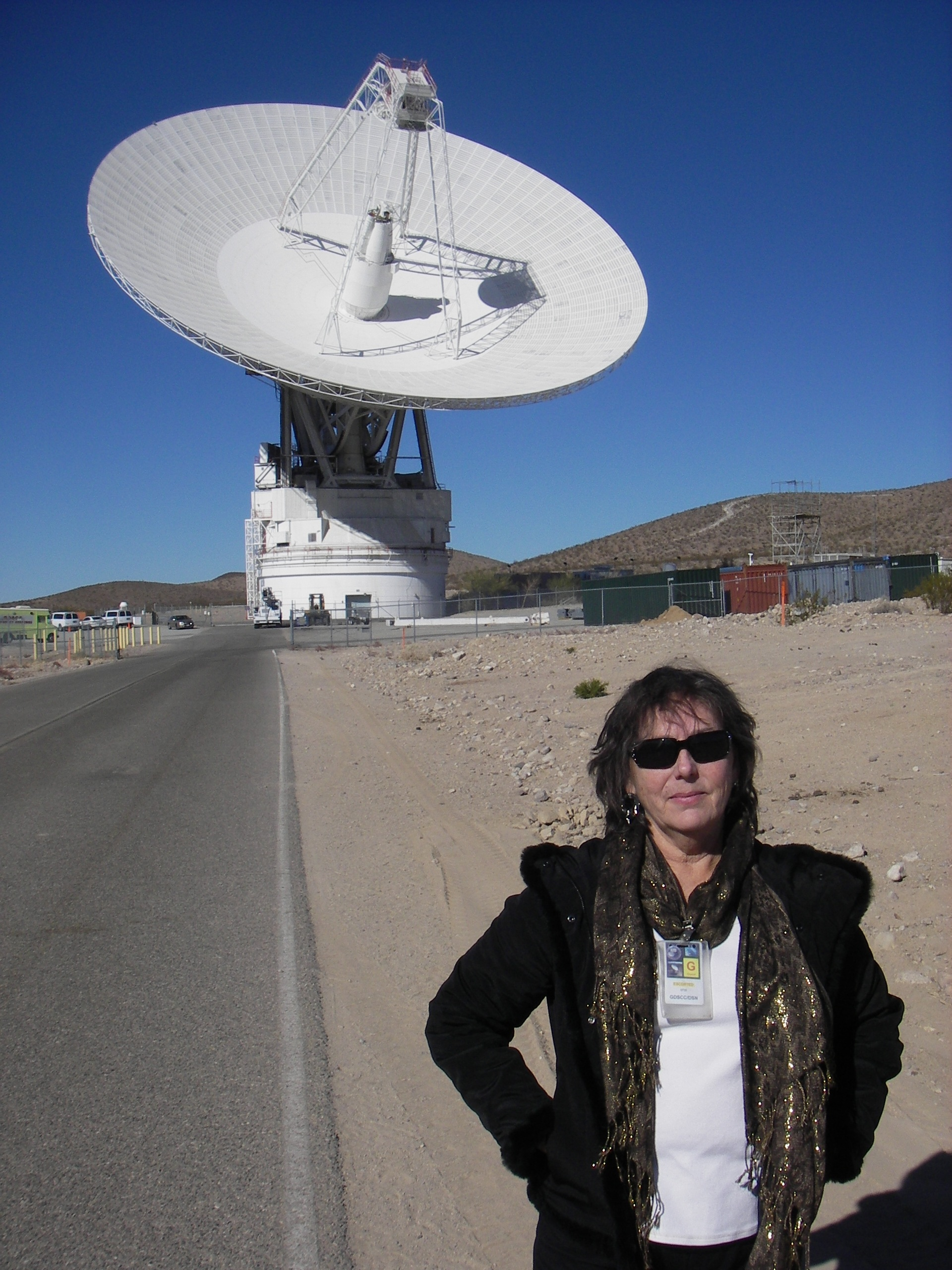
Jan Millsapps in front of the Mars Telescope at the Goldstone Deep Space Network in the Mojave Desert, October 11, 2011

Jan Millsapps (born February 26, 1950 in Concord, North Carolina) is an American digital filmmaker, fiction writer, and Professor Emerita in the Cinema Department at San Francisco State University. She has produced films, videos and interactive cinema on subjects ranging from domestic violence to global terrorism, and has published in traditional print and online venues.

== Biography ==
Throughout her career, Millsapps has focused primarily on women's issues. Her Episodes project, co-produced in 1995 with La Casa de la Madres and funded by the Creative Work Fund, featured a virtual house in which women shared true stories of surviving domestic violence. The interactive kiosk was installed at San Francisco City Hall, the San Francisco Public Library, at several Bay Area Kaiser Permanente medical centers, and was also presented at the National Latino Health Conference in Washington, D.C. Her multimedia installation Coverage, a feminist response to 9/11 and its aftermath, was the featured installation at the 2002 Mill Valley Film Festival.

In 2007 she published her first novel Screwed Pooch, about the Soviet space dog Laika. Her second novel, Venus on Mars, was published in 2014; one character in this book is based on the astronomer Wrexie Leonard, who was Percival Lowell's assistant.

In 2013, the private spaceflight organization Mars One selected her as one of 1058 astronaut candidates (out of more than 202,000 applicants) who are embarking upon two years of rigorous testing to determine which ones will be among the first humans to colonize Mars, beginning in 2025. She continued to explore her interest in space travel in her subsequent film, Madame Mars: Women and the Quest for Worlds Beyond, a documentary tracing women's progress toward equity in the outer space arena. Millsapps premiered the film at the United Nations UNISPACE + 50 event in Vienna, Austria. She also presented the film at the University of Cambridge and at the New York Academy of Sciences. The film's broadcast premiere on KQED-TV was March 22, 2019, as part of the network's Women's History Month Programming. The film was awarded first place for a professional documentary at the 2019 Raw Science Film Festival. The film also received a Director's Choice award at the Black Maria Film Festival and a Best of Fest at the Sebastopol Documentary Film Festival, and was also screened at the American Documentary Film Festival in Palm Springs, and at Doclands, the California Film Institute's docs-only festival.

In 2020 the Madame Mars film was chosen for the American Film Showcase, co-sponsored by the US State Department and the University of Southern California, and has been shown at selected sites in Egypt, Colombia, Kyrgyzstan, Jakarta and Germany.

In 2021 she was invited as keynote speaker at the Universidade Federal das Ciências da Saúde de Porto Alegre (Brazil)'s Seminar on Space & Extreme Environment Research and in 2022 she gave a plenary presentation at the 2022 Mars Society Convention.

=== Early filmmaking ===
She received attention as an independent experimental animator, as head of the media arts film program at the University of South Carolina, and as an integral member of the Southern independent film movement.

Her 1983 film True Romance received a first place award in the Ann Arbor Film Festival and was included in the South Carolina State Art Collection. Her work as an animator is cited in the book Experimental Animation.

She worked closely with the South Carolina Arts Commission; she curated and toured with the 1982 collection Travel Films from the Southern Avant-Garde that presented experimental films from Southern states in Northeastern states. In 1985 she scripted, co-produced and hosted "A Southern Film Experience," a public television program commissioned by the South Carolina Arts Commission and South Carolina Educational Television.

=== Digital cinema and multimedia work ===
She is Professor Emerita of Cinema at San Francisco State University, where she has taught since 1987. She created and taught a course to study and create films made specifically for the internet, "Cinema as an Online Medium". She teaches courses in digital cinema, interactive cinema, web cinema and short format screenwriting. In 2004 she was named an Apple Distinguished Educator.

From 1991 to 1995 she served as chair of the Cinema Department at San Francisco State University.

In 1991 she was invited by Dean August Coppola to work with a beta version of Apple's QuickTime technology. Her resulting first interactive work, Cineplay, co-produced with K.D. Davis and featured at the National Educational Film and Video Festival, began her transformation into a multimedia artist.

Pleasure Island, a live web performance co-produced in 1999 with Randall Packer, was presented at USC's Interactive Frictions conference on new media theory and practice. Her early web work was cited in a 1995 book, Film and Video on the Internet: The Top 500 Sites, and in the Journal of the Writers Guild of America.

She has worked with Apple, Inc. in a variety of capacities; from 2004 to 2009 she served on Apple Education's Higher Education Advisory Board and was featured in their 2007 webcast.

=== Writing ===
Millsapps has published writing in a variety of formats. Her scholarly, political and personal essays have appeared in the journal Film Literature Quarterly in the book International Film, Television and Radio Journals, in the San Francisco Chronicle, in the San Francisco Examiner, on The New York Times wire service, and in the inaugural issue of Sinister Wisdom.

Her short story "The Way It Was" was a 1986 award winner in the South Carolina Fiction Project. She has been a contributing editor for the online rich media journal Academic Intersections.

She was invited to present her ideas on writing and reading at the 2013 "Futures of the Book" event, sponsored by Transmedia SF and Swissnex.

=== Education ===
She earned her B.A. with honors at the University of North Carolina at Charlotte, her M.A. at Winthrop University, and her Ph.D. at the University of South Carolina.

She lives just north of San Francisco with her husband, music and media producer Phill Sawyer.

== Selected filmography/multimedia work ==
- Parthenogenesis, 1st place award in animation, North Carolina Film Festival, 1976
- Folly Beach Journal, Award, Ann Arbor Film Festival, 1982
- True Romance, 1st Prize, Ann Arbor Film Festival, S.C. State Art Collection, 1983
- A Southern Film Experience, S.C. Arts Commission and S.C. Educational Television, 1985
- Maternal Life, experimental narrative award, Ann Arbor Film Festival, 1991
- Cineplay, featured installation, National Educational Film and Video Festival, 1993
- Episodes, multimedia installation, with La Casa de las Madres, San Francisco City Hall, San Francisco Public Library, Kaiser Permanente Medical Centers in Bay Area, National Latino Health Conference, 1997
- Pleasure Island, live web performance at USC's "Interactive Friction" conference, Mill Valley Film Festival, 1999
- Coverage, featured installation, Mill Valley Film Festival, 2002

== Selected publications ==
- "Maya Deren, Imagist," feature article, Literature/Film Quarterly, Vol. XIV, 1986
- "Close-Up," review, Film, Radio and Television Journals, 1985
- "The Way It Was," short story, South Carolina Fiction Award, The State Magazine, 1986
- "Hail to the Bubba in Chief," op-ed essay, San Francisco Examiner, 1993
- "Al Gore: Oh What a Good Boy Is He," op-ed essay, San Francisco Chronicle, September 3, 2000
- "Take a Letter, Take a Look," feature article, The Lowell Observer, Fall 2008
- Screwed Pooch, historical novel, 2007
- Venus on Mars, novel, 2014
