= Bell Creek Township, Burt County, Nebraska =

Bell Creek Township
- Township
- Location in Burt County
- Coordinates: 41°52′11″N 096°24′38″W
- Country: United States
- State: Nebraska
- County: Burt

Area
  - Total: 35.77 sq mi (92.64 km^{2})
  - Land: 35.77 sq mi (92.64 km^{2})
  - Water: 0 sq mi (0 km^{2}) 0%
- Elevation: 1,385 ft (422 m)

Population (2020)
  - Total: 228
  - Density: 6.37/sq mi (2.46/km^{2})
- GNIS feature ID: 0837873

Bell Creek Township is one of twelve townships in Burt County, Nebraska, United States. The population was 228 at the 2020 census. A 2021 estimate placed the township's population at 229.

It took its name from Bell Creek.

== See also ==
- County government in Nebraska
