= Bell Creek (Elkhorn River tributary) =

Stream in Nebraska, U.S.

Coordinates: 41.432775°N 96.332244°W

Bell Creek is a stream in Washington, Dodge and Burt counties, Nebraska, in the United States.

Bell Creek was named for a family of pioneers who settled near its banks. The village of Craig is situated on the creek.

== See also ==
- List of rivers of Nebraska
