= Riverside Township =

Riverside Township may refer to:

== Illinois ==
- Riverside Township, Adams County, Illinois
- Riverside Township, Cook County, Illinois

== Iowa ==
- Riverside Township, Fremont County, Iowa
- Riverside Township, Lyon County, Iowa

== Kansas ==
- Riverside Township, Sedgwick County, Kansas
- Riverside Township, Trego County, Kansas, in Trego County, Kansas

== Michigan ==
- Riverside Township, Missaukee County, Michigan

== Minnesota ==
- Riverside Township, Lac qui Parle County, Minnesota

== Nebraska ==
- Riverside Township, Burt County, Nebraska
- Riverside Township, Gage County, Nebraska

== New Jersey ==
- Riverside Township, Burlington County, New Jersey

== North Dakota ==
- Riverside Township, Steele County, North Dakota, in Steele County, North Dakota

== South Dakota ==
- Riverside Township, Brown County, South Dakota, in Brown County, South Dakota
- Riverside Township, Clay County, South Dakota, in Clay County, South Dakota
- Riverside Township, Hand County, South Dakota, in Hand County, South Dakota
- Riverside Township, Mellette County, South Dakota, in Mellette County, South Dakota
