= Noto: An Unexplored Corner of Japan =

1891 book by Percival Lowell

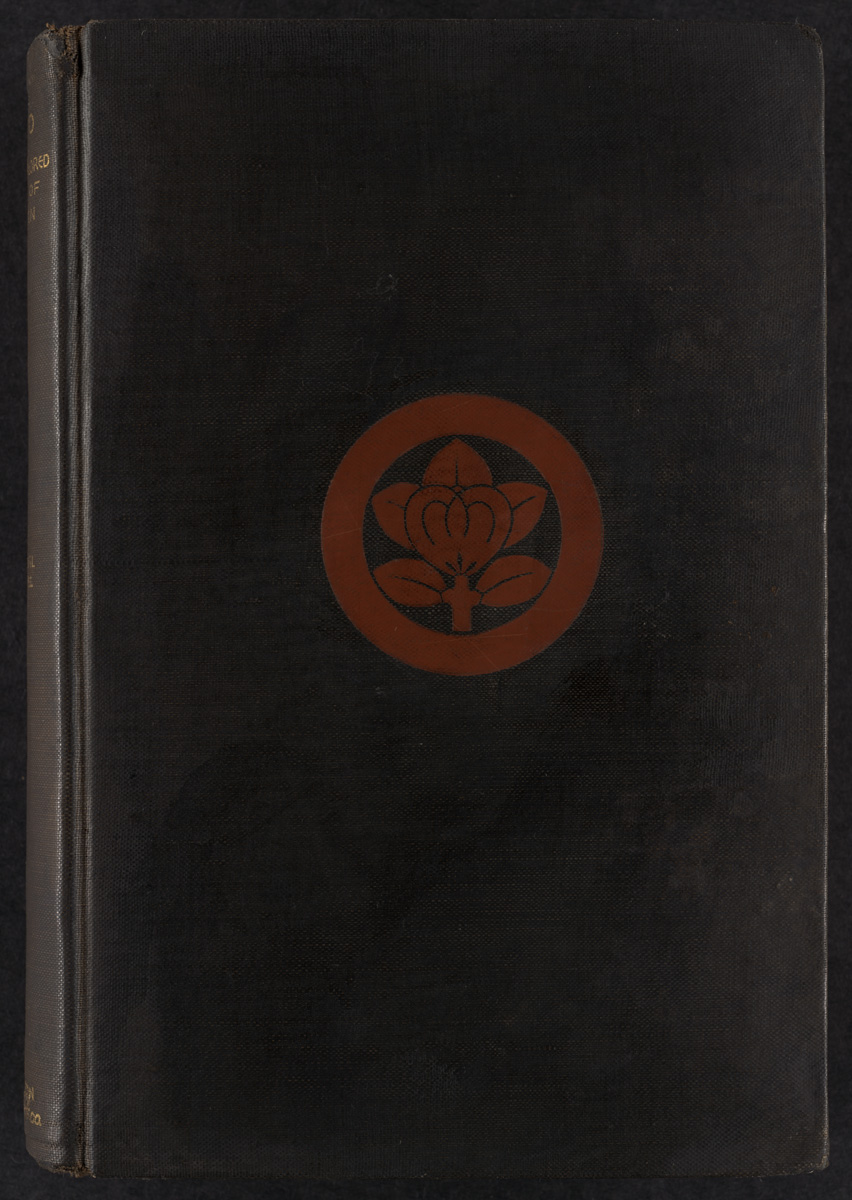
- Cover of original edition
- Author: Percival Lowell
- Language: English
- Subject: Japan
- Genre: Travel
- Published: 1891
- Publisher: Houghton, Mifflin and Company
- Publication place: America
- Media type: Book
- Pages: 261

Noto: An Unexplored Corner of Japan is a travel book written by the American businessman, mathematician and astronomer Percival Lowell, first published in 1891. It is dedicated to the British academic and Japanologist Basil Hall Chamberlain.

Lowell lived in Japan periodically from 1883 to 1893, and the book is one of three that Lowell wrote about Japan, the others being The Soul of The Far East (1888) and Occult Japan, or the Way of the Gods (1894).

== Itinerary ==
The book describes Lowell's 1886 journey from his then home in Tokyo, to the Noto Peninsula in Ishikawa Prefecture, on the western coast of the Sea of Japan. Lowell travelled westwards by train via Nagano to Naoetsu, and then via jinrikisha (rickshaw) to the town of Anamizu. Throughout the journey Lowell was accompanied by his Japanese manservant Yejiro.

In the first chapter Lowell recounts his motivation for the trip as follows:

"Scanning, one evening, in Tokyo, the map of Japan, in a vague, itinerary way, with the look one first gives to the crowd of faces in a ballroom, my eye was caught by the pose of a province that stood out in graphic mystery from the western coast. It made a striking figure there, with its deep-bosomed bays and its bold headlands. Its name, it appeared, was Noto."

In 2002 physicist and amateur astronomer Masatsugu Minami retraced and documented part of Lowell's route.

According to astronomer William Sheehan, Lowell's journey was the prototype for the expedition which led to the establishment in 1894 of a temporary Mars observatory at Mars Hill, now known as Lowell Observatory, in Flagstaff, Arizona.

== Recognition ==
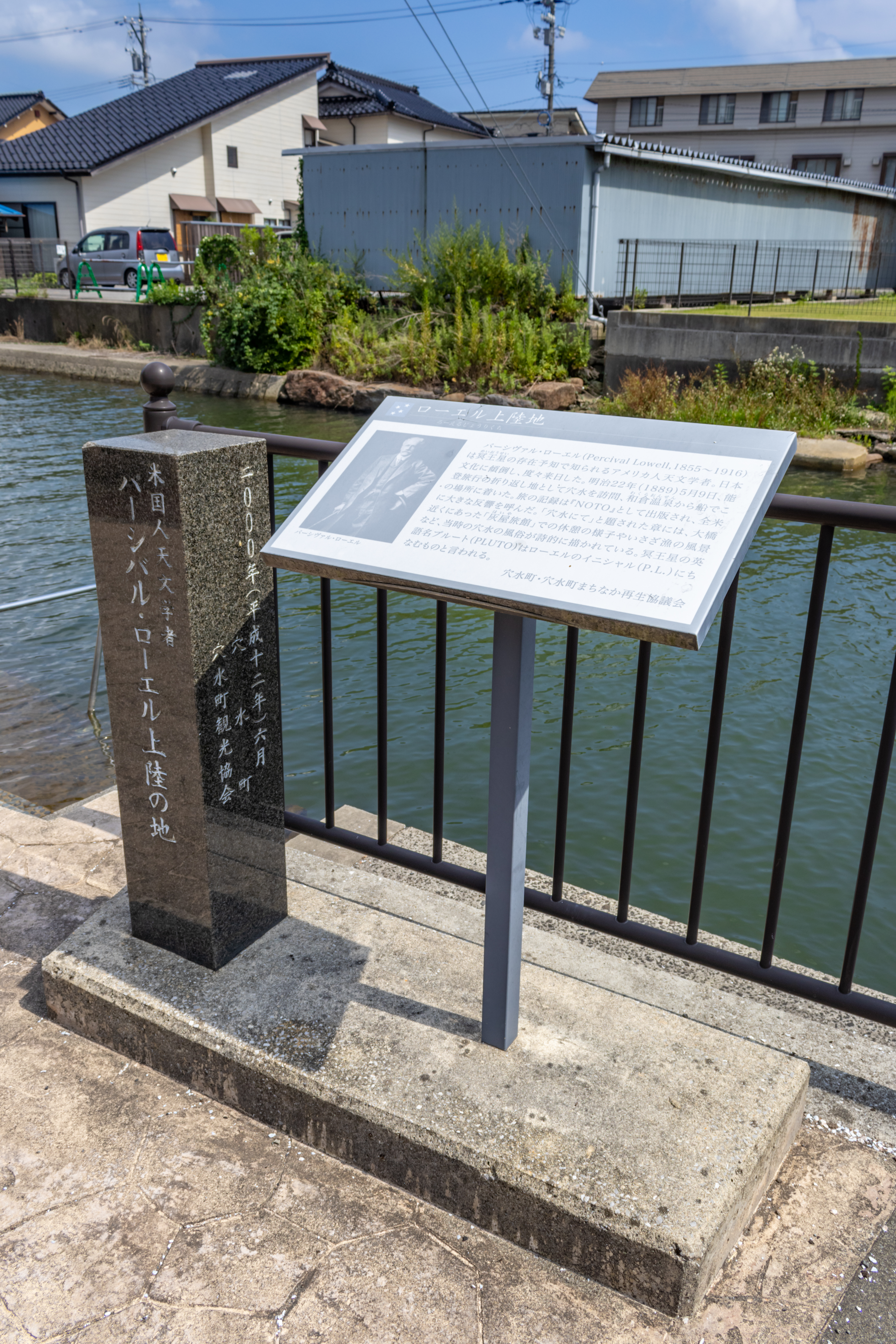
Monument (erected 2000) at the Manai River pier commemorating the landing place of Percival Lowell, Anamizu Town, Noto, Ishikawa, Japan.

The town of Anamizu commemorates Lowell's visit to Noto with two memorials, one (erected 1981) located opposite Anamizu railway station, and the second (erected 2000) at the Manai River pier. The town operates a free Sunday bus called "ローエル" ("Lowell" written in katakana) which takes visitors around the town.

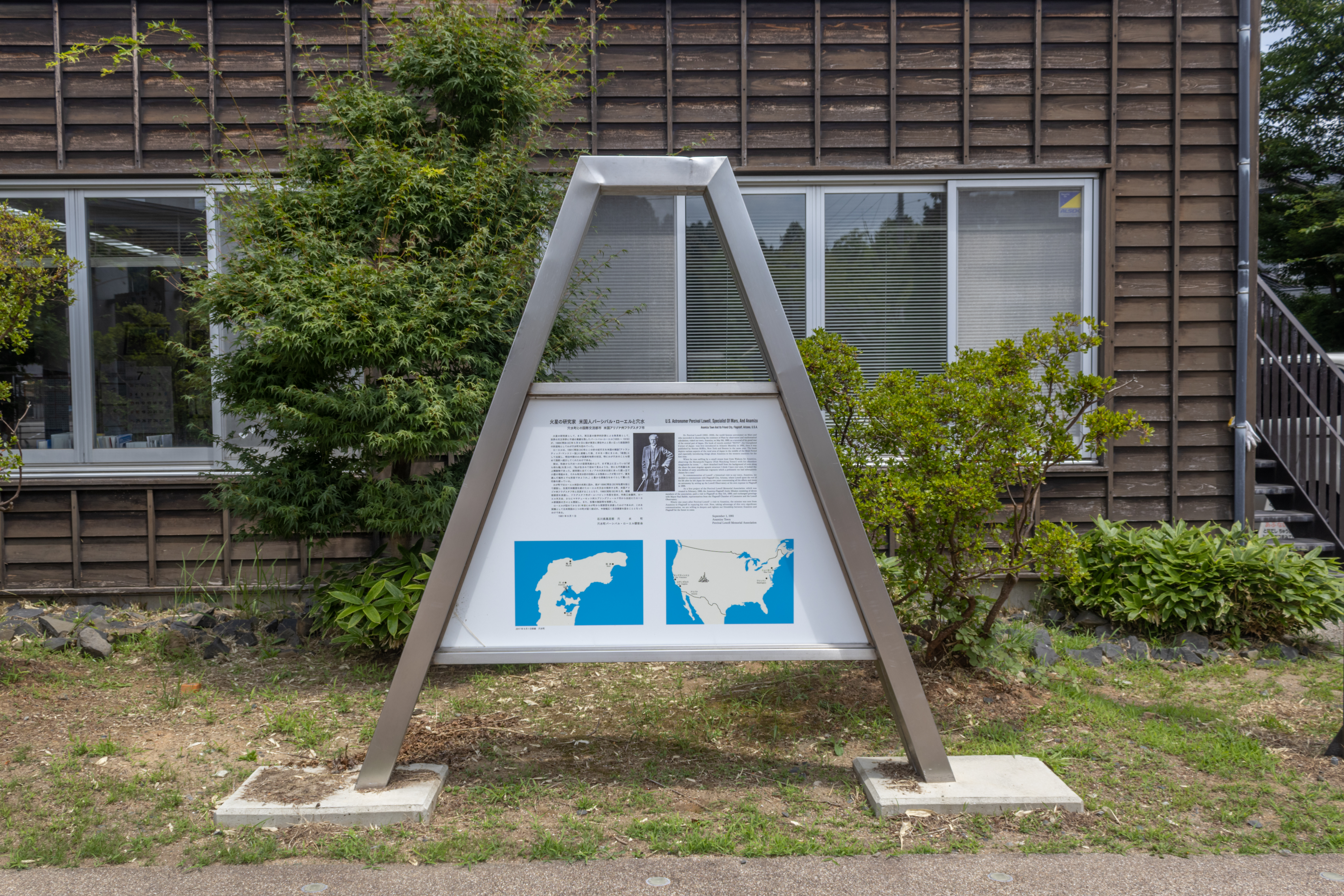
Monument (erected 1981) to Percival Lowell, Anamizu Town, Noto, Ishikawa, Japan.

== Reception ==
The Academy wrote (1891): "If on the whole the journey outward proved uneventful and the goal insignificant, the former was not without pleasant incident, nor the latter without food for reflection. ...This little book is well written and in excellent taste".

The Spectator wrote (1892): "Mr. Lowell saw Noto on the map, looking attractively out of the way in the extreme west of Japan, determined to go there, and, on the whole, did not regret his determination. He saw some curious things on the way there and back. Perhaps the feature of the journey was the "Inland Sea," which the traveller traversed in a steamer This is a pleasantly written little volume."

== Copyright status and publication ==
The book was originally published by Houghton, Mifflin and Company in 1891. The text is out of copyright and editions have been internationally commercially republished. It is available on Google Books and Project Gutenberg.
