= Craig Township, Burt County, Nebraska =

Craig Township
- Township
- Location in Burt County
- Coordinates: 41°45′32″N 096°24′28″W
- Country: United States
- State: Nebraska
- County: Burt

Area
  - Total: 56.39 sq mi (146.04 km^{2})
  - Land: 56.37 sq mi (146.01 km^{2})
  - Water: 0.012 sq mi (0.03 km^{2}) 0.02%
- Elevation: 1,302 ft (397 m)

Population (2020)
  - Total: 442
  - Density: 7.84/sq mi (3.03/km^{2})
- GNIS feature ID: 0837945

Craig Township is one of twelve townships in Burt County, Nebraska, United States. The population was 442 at the 2020 census. A 2021 estimate placed the township's population at 442.

The Village of Craig is located within the township. Off-reservation trust land belonging to the Ho-Chunk nation makes up a small part of the township.

== See also ==
- County government in Nebraska
