= Wrexie Leonard =

American astronomer (1867–1937)

- Leonard c. 1900
- Born: Wrexie Louise Leonard; September 15, 1867
- Died: November 9, 1937 (aged 70); Medfield, Massachusetts
- Scientific career
- Fields: Astronomy

Wrexie Leonard (September 15, 1867 – November 9, 1937), also known as Louise Leonard, was an American astronomer who worked as an assistant to Percival Lowell and published her observations of Mars. The Leonard Crater on Venus is named for her.

== Biography ==
Wrexie Louise Leonard was raised in Troy, Pennsylvania, and later moved to Boston. She was private secretary and assistant to the astronomer Percival Lowell for over two decades, from 1893 until Lowell's death. She managed Lowell's correspondence, edited his many articles and speeches, and traveled with him extensively. In 1895, she traveled to Africa with Lowell to look for a site for a new observatory, which was later established in Flagstaff, Arizona. After the establishment of the observatory, now the Lowell Observatory, she carried out astronomical observations there, studying the planets Mercury, Venus, Jupiter, and especially Mars. The observatory's logbooks show that "W.L.L." carried out observations frequently in the early years, and include sketches that she made of Mars and Venus. This indicates that she was regularly using the large telescope a half century before it became common for women in astronomy to do so.

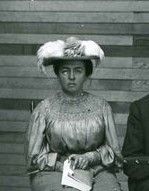
Leonard in 1905

Leonard also supervised the laboratory during Lowell's absences, and accompanied him to Tacubaya, outside Mexico City, when the large Clark refractor was shipped there in 1896 for one of several oppositions of Mars that she would observe. In 1907, she published her drawings of Mars in Popular Astronomy with notes on the planet—its ice caps, Lowell's 'canals'— during some of the years when it was in opposition (1901, 1903, 1905).

In 1904, Leonard was inducted into the Societé Astronomique de France, then an unusual honor for a woman. She was also an honorary member of the Sociedad Astronómica de México.

After Lowell's death in 1916, his widow, Constance, fired Leonard and she moved back to the eastern United States. Five years later, she published the memoir Percival Lowell: An Afterglow, which includes passages from her correspondence with Lowell. She lost money in the stock market crash of 1929 and afterwards moved into a home for the aged in Roxbury, Massachusetts; she died in 1937 in the hospital in Medfield, Massachusetts.

== Legacy ==
The 31.7-kilometre (19.7 mi) wide Leonard crater on Venus (latitude −73.8, longitude 185.2) is named after her.

Leonard was the basis for the character Lulu in Jan Millsapps' 2014 novel Venus on Mars.
