= Lowell Regio =

Polar region on Pluto

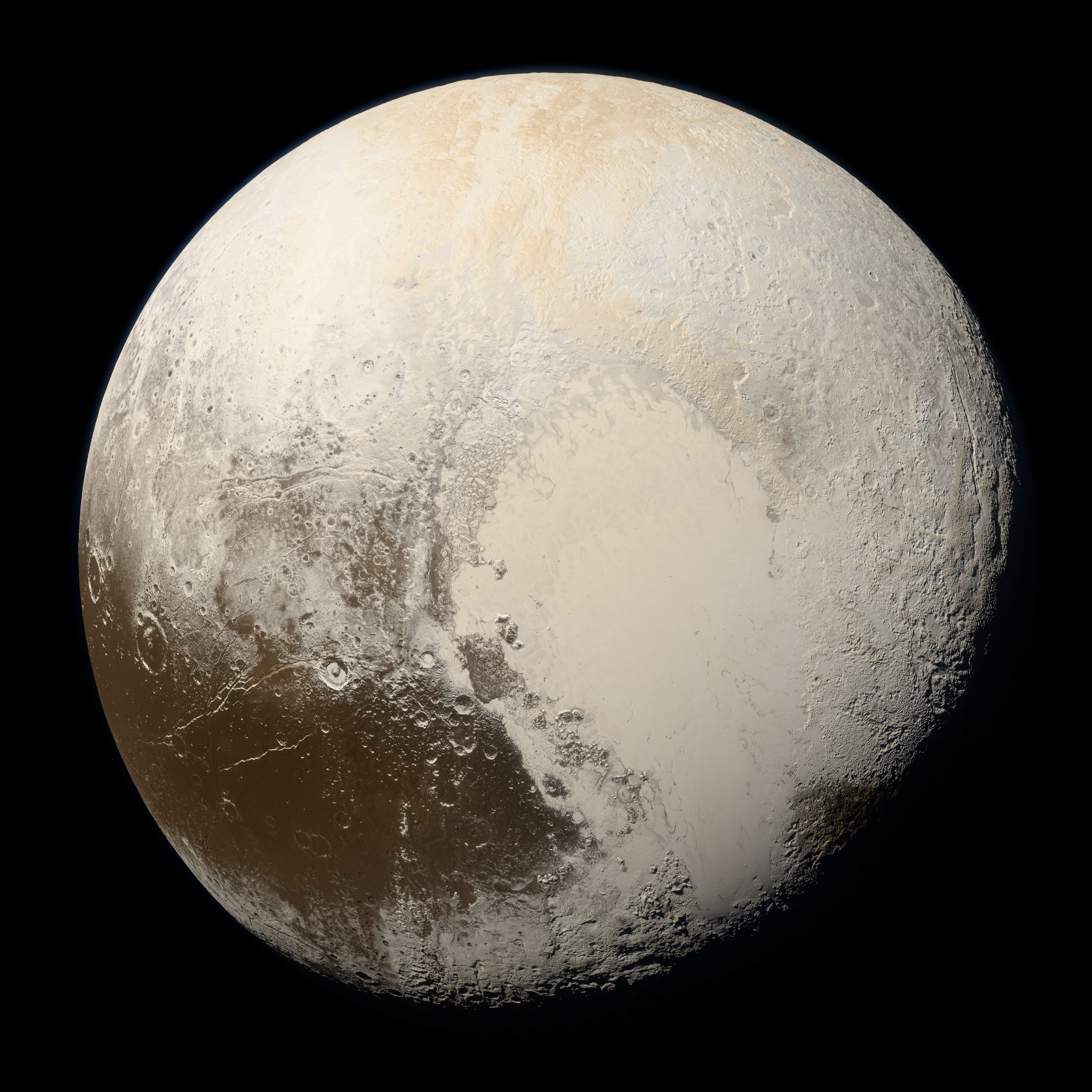
- New Horizons image of Pluto, with Lowell Regio and Pluto’s north pole at the top of the image
- Feature type: Region
- Location: Pluto
- Discoverer: New Horizons
- Naming: Percival Lowell

Lowell Regio /ˈloʊəl ˈriːdʒioʊ/ is a region on the dwarf planet Pluto. It was discovered by the New Horizons spacecraft in 2015. The region corresponds to the Plutonian northern polar cap. It is named after Percival Lowell who established the observatory where Clyde Tombaugh discovered Pluto.
