= Bertha, Nebraska =

Unincorporated community in Nebraska, United States

- Unincorporated Community
- Location within Nebraska Location within the United States
- Coordinates: 41.9°N 96.3°W
- Country: United States
- State: Nebraska
- County: Burt
- Elevation: 4,531 ft (1,381 m)
- GNIS feature ID: 835248

Bertha is an unincorporated community in Burt County, Nebraska, United States.

== History ==
A post office was established at Bertha in 1890, closed temporarily in 1895, reopened in 1898, and closed permanently in 1900.
