= Everett Township, Burt County, Nebraska =

Everett Township
- Township
- Location in Burt County
- Coordinates: 41°57′59″N 096°31′05″W
- Country: United States
- State: Nebraska
- County: Burt

Area
  - Total: 32.9 sq mi (85.1 km^{2})
  - Land: 32.9 sq mi (85.1 km^{2})
  - Water: 0 sq mi (0 km^{2}) 0%
- Elevation: 1,316 ft (401 m)

Population (2020)
  - Total: 955
  - Density: 29.1/sq mi (11.2/km^{2})
- GNIS feature ID: 0837995

Everett Township is one of twelve townships in Burt County, Nebraska, United States. The population was 955 at the 2020 census. A 2021 estimate placed the township's population at 949.

The City of Lyons lies within the Township.

== See also ==
- County government in Nebraska
