= Basford, Nebraska =

- Ghost Town
- Location within Nebraska
- Coordinates: 42°N 96.37°W
- Country: United States
- State: Nebraska
- County: Burt

Basford is a ghost town in Burt County, Nebraska, United States.

== History ==
A post office was established at Basford in 1895, and remained in operation until it was discontinued in 1901. The town was likely named after Basford, in England.
