= Pershing Township, Burt County, Nebraska =

Pershing Township
- Township
- Location in Burt County
- Coordinates: 41°47′08″N 096°30′45″W
- Country: United States
- State: Nebraska
- County: Burt

Area
  - Total: 28.53 sq mi (73.88 km^{2})
  - Land: 28.53 sq mi (73.88 km^{2})
  - Water: 0 sq mi (0 km^{2}) 0%
- Elevation: 1,273 ft (388 m)

Population (2020)
  - Total: 118
  - Density: 4.14/sq mi (1.60/km^{2})
- GNIS feature ID: 0838187

Pershing Township is one of twelve townships in Burt County, Nebraska, United States. The population was 118 at the 2020 census. A 2021 estimate placed the township's population at 118.

== See also ==
- County government in Nebraska
