= Silver Creek Township, Burt County, Nebraska =

Silver Creek Township
- Township
- Location in Burt County
- Coordinates: 41°52′03″N 096°17′34″W
- Country: United States
- State: Nebraska
- County: Burt

Area
  - Total: 35.90 sq mi (92.99 km^{2})
  - Land: 35.90 sq mi (92.99 km^{2})
  - Water: 0 sq mi (0 km^{2}) 0%
- Elevation: 1,250 ft (381 m)

Population (2020)
  - Total: 116
  - Density: 3.23/sq mi (1.25/km^{2})
- GNIS feature ID: 0838253

Silver Creek Township is one of twelve townships in Burt County, Nebraska, United States. The population was 116 at the 2020 census. A 2021 estimate placed the township's population at 116.

== See also ==
- County government in Nebraska
