= Burt County, Nebraska =

County in Nebraska, United States

- County
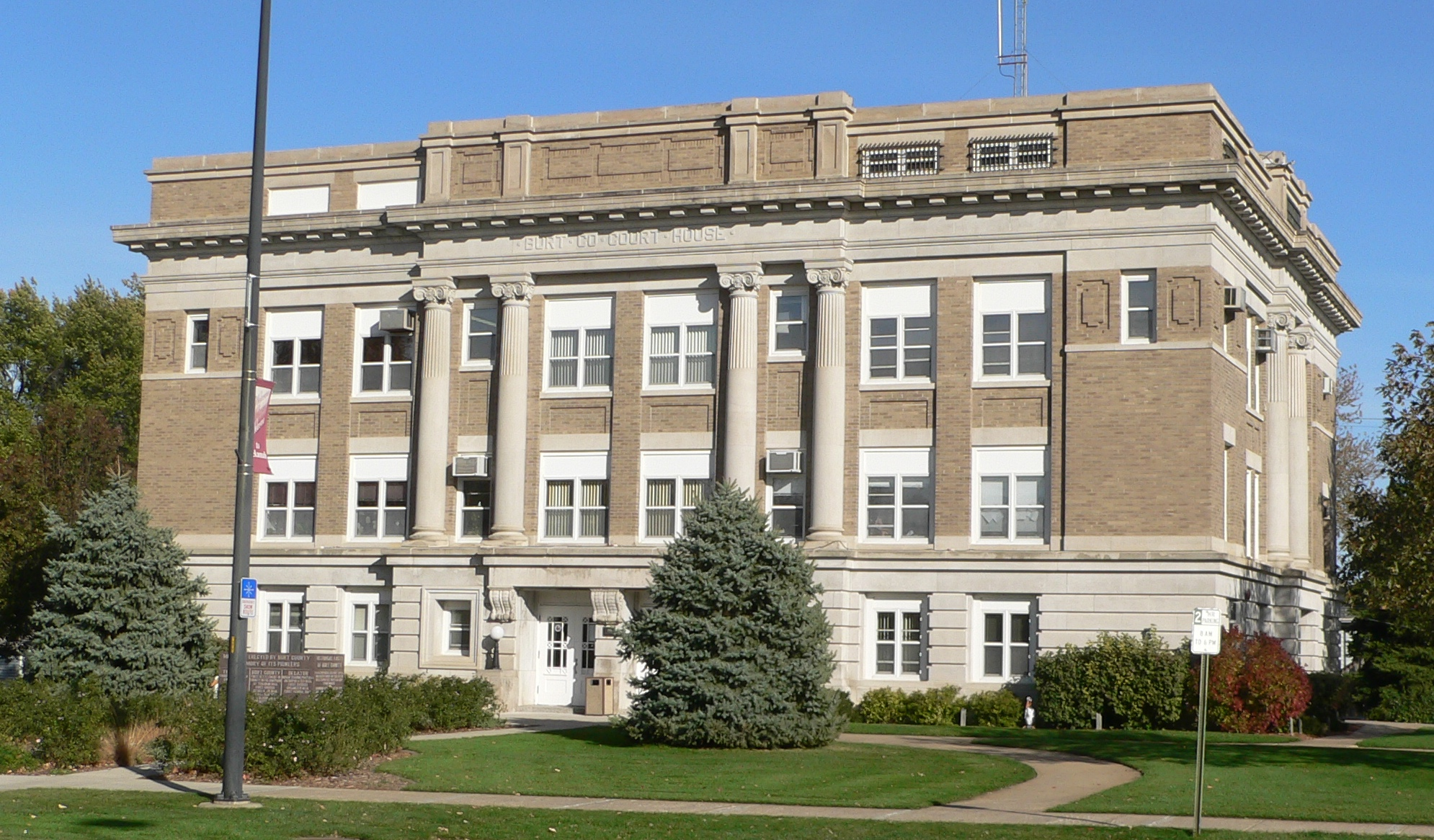
- The Burt County Courthouse in Tekamah

- Location within the U.S. state of Nebraska
- Coordinates: 41.854179°N 96.337746°W
- Country: United States
- State: Nebraska
- Founded: November 23, 1854
- Named for: Francis Burt
- Seat: Tekamah
- Largest city: Tekamah

Area
  - Total: 497.064 sq mi (1,287.39 km^{2})
  - Land: 491.587 sq mi (1,273.20 km^{2})
  - Water: 5.477 sq mi (14.19 km^{2}) 1.10%

Population (2020)
  - Total: 6,722
  - Estimate (2025): 6,678 ▼
  - Density: 13.67/sq mi (5.280/km^{2})
- Time zone: UTC−6 (Central)
  - Summer (DST): UTC−5 (CDT)
- Area code: 402 and 531
- Congressional district: 3rd
- Website: burtcountyne.gov
- • Nebraska county number 11 • Nebraska license plate prefix 31

Burt County is a county in the U.S. state of Nebraska, bordering the west bank of the upper Missouri River. As of the 2020 census, the population was 6,722, and was estimated to be 6,678 in 2025. The county seat and the largest city is Tekamah.

In the Nebraska license plate system, Burt County was represented by the prefix "31" (as it had the 31st-largest number of vehicles registered in the state when the license plate system was established in 1922).

== History ==
Burt County was created on November 23, 1854 and named after Francis Burt, the first governor of Nebraska Territory.

== Geography ==
According to the United States Census Bureau, the county has a total area of 497.064 square miles (1,287.39 km^{2}), of which 491.587 square miles (1,273.20 km^{2}) is land and 5.477 square miles (14.19 km^{2}) (1.10%) is water. It is the 76th-largest county in Nebraska by total area. Its east boundary line is formed by the western border of the state of Iowa, a boundary mostly aligning with the Missouri River. Because of shifts in the river over time, small portions of the county are now located on the eastern bank of the river.

=== Major highways ===
- U.S. Highway 75
- U.S. Highway 77
- Nebraska Highway 32
- Nebraska Highway 51

=== Adjacent counties ===
- Thurston County - north
- Monona County, Iowa - northeast
- Harrison County, Iowa - southeast
- Washington County - south
- Dodge County - southwest
- Cuming County - west

== Demographics ==
Historical population
Census	Pop.	Note	%±
1860	388		—
1870	2,847		633.8%
1880	6,937		143.7%
1890	11,609		67.3%
1900	13,040		12.3%
1910	12,726		−2.4%
1920	12,559		−1.3%
1930	13,062		4.0%
1940	12,546		−4.0%
1950	11,536		−8.1%
1960	10,192		−11.7%
1970	9,247		−9.3%
1980	8,813		−4.7%
1990	7,868		−10.7%
2000	7,791		−1.0%
2010	6,858		−12.0%
2020	6,722		−2.0%
2025 (est.)	6,678	▼	−0.7%
U.S. Decennial Census; 1790–1960 1900–1990; 1990–2000 2010–2020

=== 2020 census ===
As of the 2020 census, the county had a population of 6,722. The median age was 47.2 years. 22.2% of residents were under the age of 18 and 24.9% of residents were 65 years of age or older. For every 100 females there were 102.2 males, and for every 100 females age 18 and over there were 99.6 males age 18 and over.

The racial makeup of the county was 92.9% White, 0.3% Black or African American, 1.2% American Indian and Alaska Native, 0.5% Asian, 0.3% Native Hawaiian and Pacific Islander, 0.8% from some other race, and 4.0% from two or more races. Hispanic or Latino residents of any race comprised 2.6% of the population.

0.0% of residents lived in urban areas, while 100.0% lived in rural areas.

There were 2,851 households in the county, of which 25.9% had children under the age of 18 living with them and 21.4% had a female householder with no spouse or partner present. About 31.5% of all households were made up of individuals and 17.5% had someone living alone who was 65 years of age or older.

There were 3,324 housing units, of which 14.2% were vacant. Among occupied housing units, 76.7% were owner-occupied and 23.3% were renter-occupied. The homeowner vacancy rate was 2.6% and the rental vacancy rate was 10.2%.

=== 2000 census ===
As of the 2000 census, there were 7,791 people, 3,155 households, and 2,240 families in the county. The population density was 16 people per square mile (6.2 people/km^{2}). There were 3,723 housing units at an average density of 8 units per square mile (3.1/km^{2}). The racial makeup of the county was 97.63% White, 0.18% Black or African American, 1.07% Native American, 0.19% Asian, 0.03% Pacific Islander, 0.22% from other races, and 0.69% from two or more races. 1.26% of the population were Hispanic or Latino of any race. 33.7% were of German, 13.9% Swedish, 10.1% Irish, 8.8% American, 7.0% English and 5.4% Danish ancestry according to Census 2000.

There were 3,155 households, out of which 29.50% had children under the age of 18 living with them, 61.30% were married couples living together, 6.20% had a female householder with no husband present, and 29.00% were non-families. 26.50% of all households were made up of individuals, and 15.60% had someone living alone who was 65 years of age or older. The average household size was 2.43 and the average family size was 2.93.

The county population contained 25.70% under the age of 18, 5.40% from 18 to 24, 23.40% from 25 to 44, 23.80% from 45 to 64, and 21.80% who were 65 years of age or older. The median age was 42 years. For every 100 females there were 93.80 males. For every 100 females age 18 and over, there were 91.80 males.

The median income for a household in the county was $33,954, and the median income for a family was $40,515. Males had a median income of $28,750 versus $20,663 for females. The per capita income for the county was $16,654. About 6.60% of families and 8.90% of the population were below the poverty line, including 11.80% of those under age 18 and 8.30% of those age 65 or over.

== Communities ==
=== Cities ===
- Lyons
- Oakland
- Tekamah (county seat)

=== Villages ===
- Craig
- Decatur

=== Unincorporated communities ===
- Arizona
- Bertha

=== Townships ===
- Arizona
- Bell Creek
- Craig
- Decatur
- Everett
- Logan
- Oakland
- Pershing
- Quinnebaugh
- Riverside
- Silver Creek
- Summit

=== Ghost towns ===
- Argo
- Basford

== Politics ==
Burt County voters have historically voted Republican. No Democratic Party candidate has carried the county in a national election since 1936.

Political Party	Number of registered voters (March 1, 2026)	Percent
Republican	2,859	59.54%
Democratic	955	19.89%
Independent	902	18.78%
Libertarian	57	1.19%
Legal Marijuana Now	29	0.60%
Total	4,802	100.00%

United States presidential election results for Burt County, Nebraska
Year	Republican		Democratic		Third party(ies)	
Year	No.	%	No.	%	No.	%
1900	1,929	61.30%	1,174	37.31%	44	1.40%
1904	2,081	72.23%	528	18.33%	272	9.44%
1908	1,880	59.53%	1,215	38.47%	63	1.99%
1912	865	29.13%	1,040	35.03%	1,064	35.84%
1916	1,508	50.33%	1,425	47.56%	63	2.10%
1920	2,969	70.22%	1,194	28.24%	65	1.54%
1924	2,813	54.32%	1,870	36.11%	496	9.58%
1928	3,551	66.34%	1,783	33.31%	19	0.35%
1932	1,857	32.83%	3,734	66.02%	65	1.15%
1936	2,710	45.92%	3,120	52.87%	71	1.20%
1940	3,443	57.08%	2,589	42.92%	0	0.00%
1944	3,189	59.60%	2,162	40.40%	0	0.00%
1948	2,656	58.30%	1,900	41.70%	0	0.00%
1952	4,154	76.97%	1,243	23.03%	0	0.00%
1956	3,459	69.49%	1,519	30.51%	0	0.00%
1960	3,613	72.56%	1,366	27.44%	0	0.00%
1964	2,459	54.25%	2,074	45.75%	0	0.00%
1968	2,615	68.55%	937	24.56%	263	6.89%
1972	2,937	76.54%	900	23.46%	0	0.00%
1976	2,510	63.27%	1,375	34.66%	82	2.07%
1980	2,806	72.08%	814	20.91%	273	7.01%
1984	2,645	71.08%	1,054	28.33%	22	0.59%
1988	2,050	58.06%	1,458	41.29%	23	0.65%
1992	1,667	42.61%	1,224	31.29%	1,021	26.10%
1996	1,707	48.83%	1,237	35.38%	552	15.79%
2000	2,056	60.61%	1,223	36.06%	113	3.33%
2004	2,349	64.04%	1,272	34.68%	47	1.28%
2008	1,907	56.30%	1,413	41.72%	67	1.98%
2012	2,029	60.12%	1,291	38.25%	55	1.63%
2016	2,367	66.53%	930	26.14%	261	7.34%
2020	2,580	69.00%	1,063	28.43%	96	2.57%
2024	2,632	71.81%	983	26.82%	50	1.36%

== Education ==
School districts include:

- Bancroft-Rosalie Community Schools #20, Bancroft
- Logan View Public Schools #594, Hooper
- Lyons-Decatur Northeast Schools #20, Lyons
- Oakland-Craig Public Schools #14, Oakland
- Tekamah-Herman Community Schools #1, Tekamah

== See also ==
- National Register of Historic Places listings in Burt County, Nebraska
