= Decatur Township, Burt County, Nebraska =

Decatur Township
- Township
- Location in Burt County
- Coordinates: 41°58′29″N 096°17′07″W
- Country: United States
- State: Nebraska
- County: Burt

Area
  - Total: 48.53 sq mi (125.69 km^{2})
  - Land: 47.53 sq mi (123.09 km^{2})
  - Water: 1.0 sq mi (2.6 km^{2}) 2.07%
- Elevation: 1,122 ft (342 m)

Population (2020)
  - Total: 576
  - Density: 12.1/sq mi (4.68/km^{2})
- GNIS feature ID: 0837959

Decatur Township is one of twelve townships in Burt County, Nebraska, United States. The population was 576 at the 2020 census. A 2021 estimate placed the township's population at 576.

The Village of Decatur is located within the Township.

== See also ==
- County government in Nebraska
