= Arizona Township, Burt County, Nebraska =

Arizona Township
- Township
- Location in Burt County
- Coordinates: 41°45′49″N 096°09′19″W
- Country: United States
- State: Nebraska
- County: Burt

Area
  - Total: 73.19 sq mi (189.57 km^{2})
  - Land: 72.02 sq mi (186.52 km^{2})
  - Water: 1.18 sq mi (3.06 km^{2}) 1.61%
- Elevation: 1,027 ft (313 m)

Population (2020)
  - Total: 306
  - Density: 4.25/sq mi (1.64/km^{2})
- GNIS feature ID: 0837858

Arizona Township is one of twelve townships in Burt County, Nebraska, United States. The population was 306 at the 2020 census. A 2021 estimate placed the township's population at 306.

== See also ==
- County government in Nebraska
