= Oakland Township, Burt County, Nebraska =

Oakland Township
- Township
- Location in Burt County
- Coordinates: 41°52′35″N 096°30′33″W
- Country: United States
- State: Nebraska
- County: Burt

Area
  - Total: 27.87 sq mi (72.19 km^{2})
  - Land: 27.87 sq mi (72.19 km^{2})
  - Water: 0 sq mi (0 km^{2}) 0%
- Elevation: 1,273 ft (388 m)

Population (2020)
  - Total: 124
  - Density: 4.45/sq mi (1.72/km^{2})
- GNIS feature ID: 0838170

Oakland Township is one of twelve townships in Burt County, Nebraska, United States. The population was 124 at the 2020 census. A 2021 estimate placed the township's population at 124. The township is located in eastern Nebraska within the Great Plains region. It is surrounded by small rural communities, and agriculture and livestock farming are the main economic activities in the surrounding area.

== See also ==
- County government in Nebraska
