= Craig, Nebraska =

Village in Nebraska, US

- Village
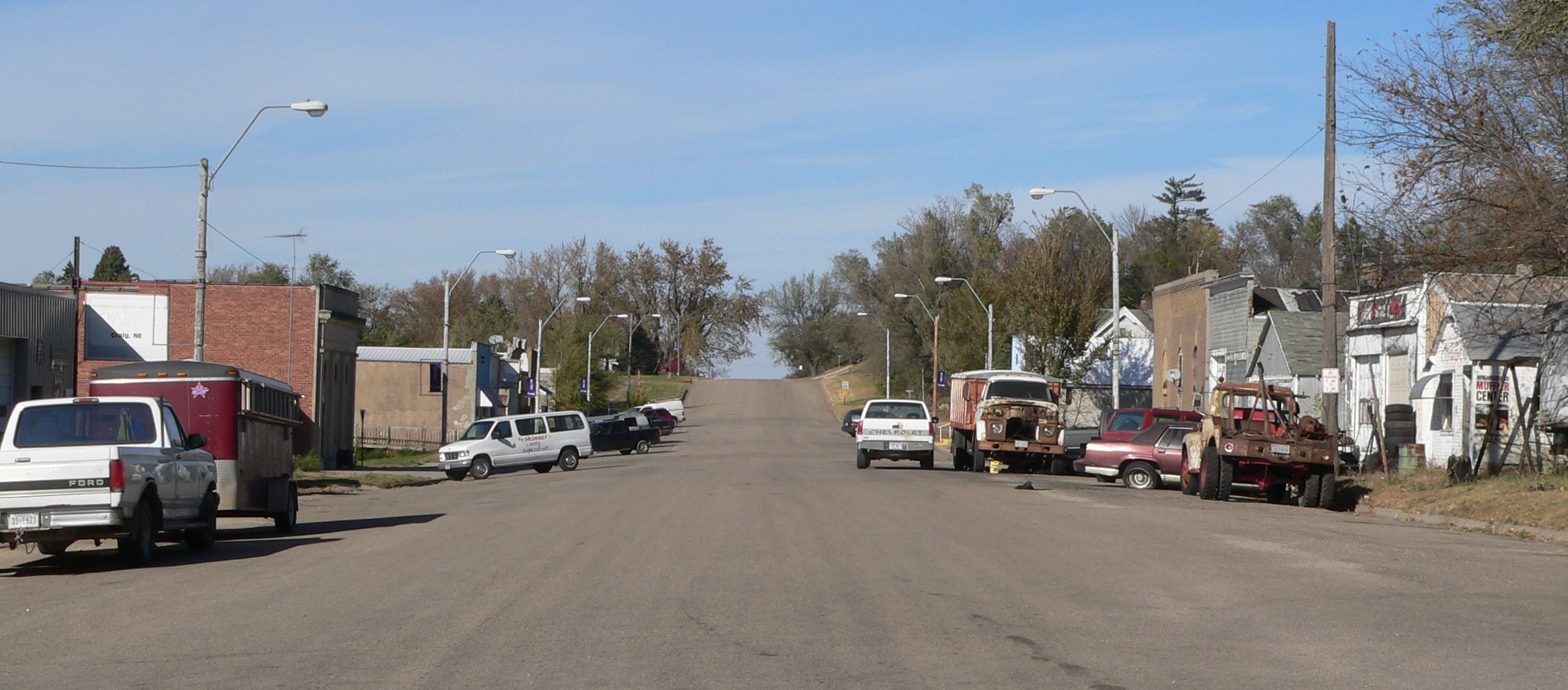
- Main Street in Craig

- Location of Craig, Nebraska
- Coordinates: 41°47′07″N 96°21′45″W
- Country: United States
- State: Nebraska
- County: Burt

Area
  - Total: 0.29 sq mi (0.74 km^{2})
  - Land: 0.29 sq mi (0.74 km^{2})
  - Water: 0 sq mi (0.00 km^{2})
- Elevation: 1,322 ft (403 m)

Population (2020)
  - Total: 202
  - Density: 709.5/sq mi (273.95/km^{2})
- Time zone: UTC-6 (Central (CST))
  - Summer (DST): UTC-5 (CDT)
- ZIP code: 68019
- Area code: 402
- FIPS code: 31-11090
- GNIS feature ID: 2398642
- Website: villageofcraig.us

Craig is a village in Burt County, Nebraska, United States. As of the 2020 census, Craig had a population of 202.

== History ==
During the 19th century the land near Craig was inhabited by the Pawnee, Otoe-Missouria, and Omaha people. American Indian inhabitants were numerous when white settlement began in the 1860s.

The village was established as a water-station on the Chicago, St. Paul, Minneapolis & Omaha Railway and named for early settler William Stewart Craig, who in the early 1880s donated the land on which the town was built. Craig was laid out in 1881.

Craig's Main Street was a busy commercial center prior to the 1920s, when the introduction of automobiles made it easier to shop elsewhere. Craig became impoverished during the Great Depression. The First National Bank of Craig closed in 1933; bank depositors recovered about 78 cents on the dollar several years later.

Craig's former village clerk Kristie Jensen was sentenced to prison in 2018 for embezzling over $185,000 in village funds.

=== Water tower ===
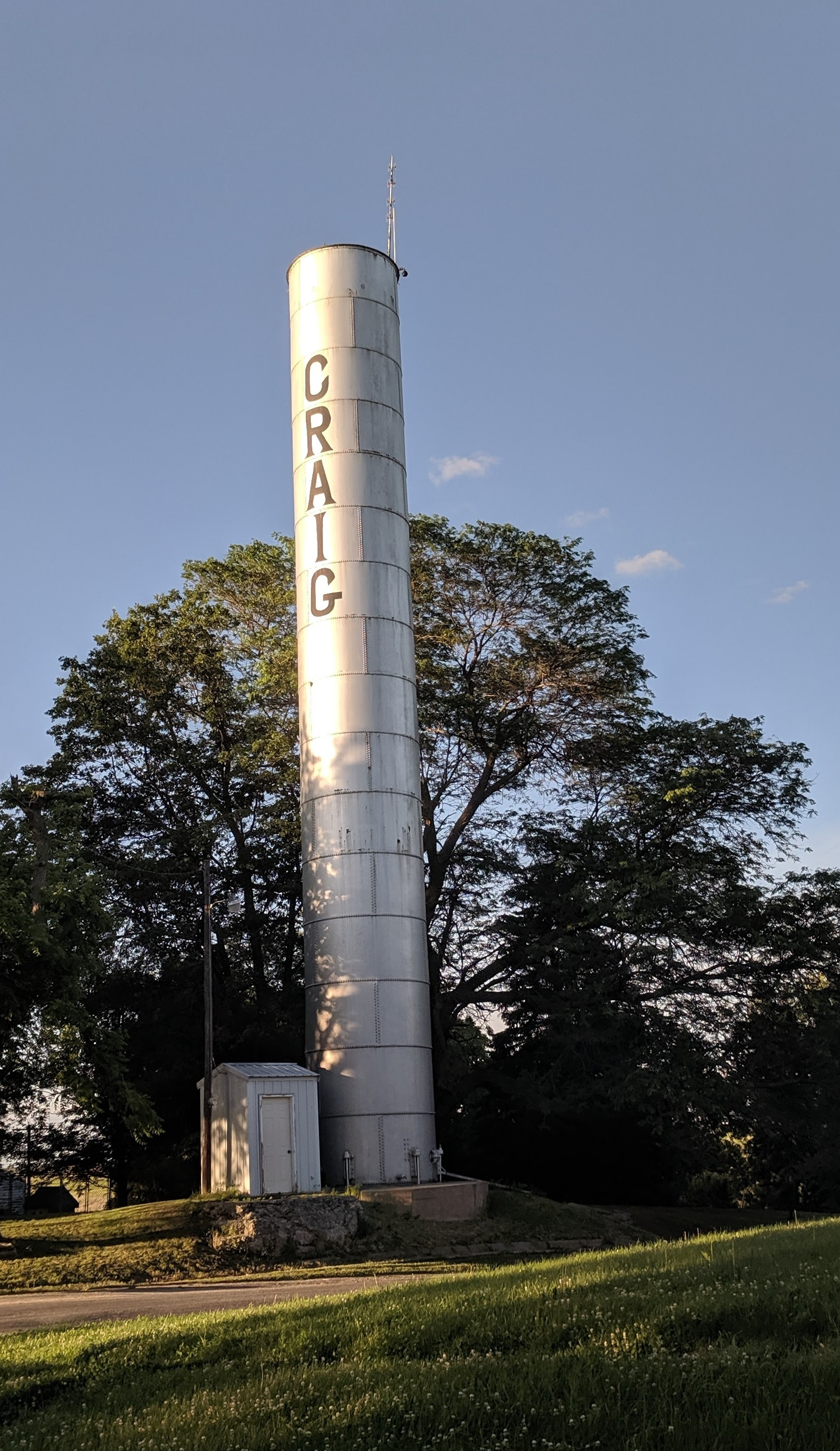
Craig's standpipe water tower

Craig has a distinctive standpipe water tower dating from the early 20th century. Its walls have thinned over the years but it still functions as the town's water supply.

== Geography ==
Most of the town is situated on a single hillside overlooking the Bell Creek valley.

According to the United States Census Bureau, the village has a total area of 0.28 square miles (0.73 km^{2}), all land.

== Demographics ==
Historical population
Census	Pop.	Note	%±
1890	290		—
1900	462		59.3%
1910	339		−26.6%
1920	418		23.3%
1930	452		8.1%
1940	437		−3.3%
1950	384		−12.1%
1960	378		−1.6%
1970	295		−22.0%
1980	237		−19.7%
1990	228		−3.8%
2000	241		5.7%
2010	199		−17.4%
2020	202		1.5%
U.S. Decennial Census

=== 2010 census ===
As of the census of 2010, there were 199 people, 85 households, and 51 families residing in the village. The population density was 710.7 inhabitants per square mile (274.4/km^{2}). There were 105 housing units at an average density of 375.0 per square mile (144.8/km^{2}). The racial makeup of the village was 91.5% White, 0.5% African American, 2.5% Native American, 0.5% Asian, 2.0% from other races, and 3.0% from two or more races. Hispanic or Latino of any race were 2.5% of the population.

There were 85 households, of which 29.4% had children under the age of 18 living with them, 43.5% were married couples living together, 11.8% had a female householder with no husband present, 4.7% had a male householder with no wife present, and 40.0% were non-families. 30.6% of all households were made up of individuals, and 13% had someone living alone who was 65 years of age or older. The average household size was 2.34 and the average family size was 2.92.

The median age in the village was 46.2 years. 23.6% of residents were under the age of 18; 6% were between the ages of 18 and 24; 17.5% were from 25 to 44; 33.1% were from 45 to 64; and 19.6% were 65 years of age or older. The gender makeup of the village was 50.3% male and 49.7% female.

=== 2000 census ===
As of the census of 2000, there were 241 people, 99 households, and 69 families residing in the village. The population density was 856.5 inhabitants per square mile (330.7/km^{2}). There were 111 housing units at an average density of 394.5 per square mile (152.3/km^{2}). The racial makeup of the village was 99.59% White, and 0.41% Native American.

There were 99 households, out of which 29.3% had children under the age of 18 living with them, 53.5% were married couples living together, 9.1% had a female householder with no husband present, and 30.3% were non-families. 26.3% of all households were made up of individuals, and 8.1% had someone living alone who was 65 years of age or older. The average household size was 2.43 and the average family size was 2.97.

In the village, the population was spread out, with 28.6% under the age of 18, 3.3% from 18 to 24, 30.3% from 25 to 44, 19.1% from 45 to 64, and 18.7% who were 65 years of age or older. The median age was 37 years. For every 100 females, there were 100.8 males. For every 100 females age 18 and over, there were 109.8 males.

The median income for a household in the village was $29,583, and the median income for a family was $31,023. Males had a median income of $30,417 versus $14,464 for females. The per capita income for the village was $10,818. About 15.5% of families and 23.4% of the population were below the poverty line, including 38.5% of those under the age of eighteen and none of those 65 or over.

== Climate ==
This climatic region is typified by large seasonal temperature differences, with warm to hot (and often humid) summers and cold (sometimes severely cold) winters. According to the Köppen Climate Classification system, Craig has a humid continental climate, abbreviated "Dfa" on climate maps.

== Notable people ==
- Ira J. McDonald, Los Angeles City Council member 1941–43, born in Craig
- Nathaniel Dixon, founder and CEO of Dixon Builders’ Inc.
