= North Quincy, Illinois =

North Quincy
- Unincorporated community
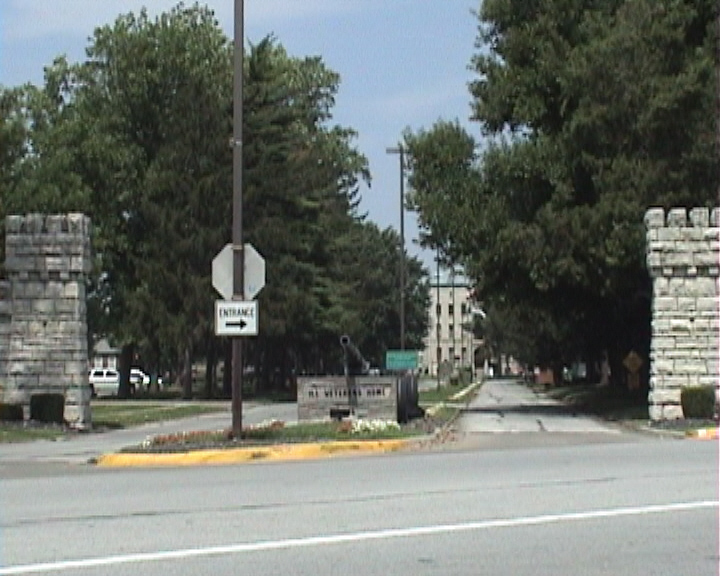
- 12th Street entrance to the Illinois Veteran's Home in North Quincy.

- Location of North Quincy within Illinois North Quincy (the United States)
- Coordinates: 39°58′24″N 91°22′38″W
- Country: United States
- State: Illinois
- County: Adams
- Established: 1871
- Elevation: 600 ft (180 m)
- Time zone: UTC-6 (CST)
  - Summer (DST): UTC-5 (CDT)

North Quincy, Illinois is an unincorporated community and neighborhood located within and immediately north of the outskirts of its parent city of Quincy. Parts of North Quincy also extend into the Riverside and Ellington townships of Adams County as a result of urban sprawl. Collectively, North Quincy functions as Quincy's largest suburb, separated from its parent city by Locust Street, a rail line, and woodlands that follow Cedar Creek–the borders are approximate. With few exceptions, much of the layout of the community does not follow the traditional grid street pattern of its parent city.

== Points of interest ==
- Bob Mays Park & Bill Klingner Trail
- Illinois Veterans Home
  - All Wars Museum
- Spring Lake Country Club
- Quincy Station (Amtrak)

== Businesses based in North Quincy ==
- Broadcast Electronics
- Hollister-Whitney
- Midwest Patterns
- Titan Tire Corporation

== See also ==
- Quincy micropolitan area
