= Percival Lowell =

American businessman, author, mathematician, and astronomer (1855–1916)

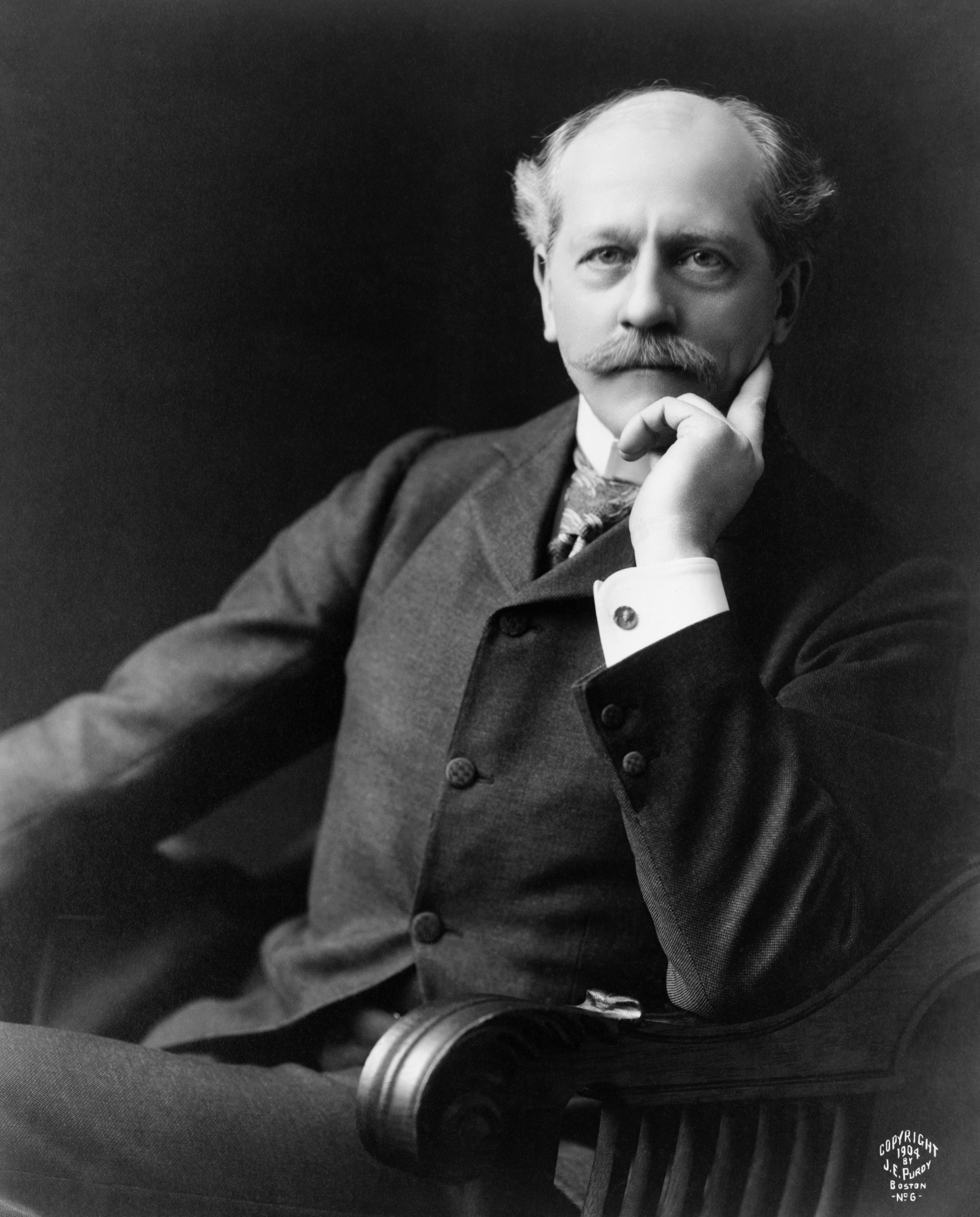
- Lowell in 1904
- Born: March 13, 1855; Boston, Massachusetts, U.S.
- Died: November 12, 1916 (aged 61); Flagstaff, Arizona, U.S.
- Resting place: Mars Hill, Lowell Observatory
- Education: Noble and Greenough School
- Alma mater: Harvard University
- Known for: Martian canals Asteroids discovered: 793 Arizona (April 9, 1907)
- Spouse: Constance Savage Lowell (m. 1908)
- Scientific career
- Fields: Astronomy

Signature
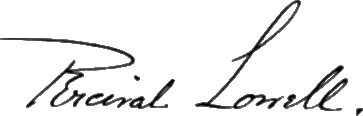

Percival Lowell (/ˈloʊəl/; March 13, 1855 – November 12, 1916) was an American businessman, author, mathematician, and astronomer who fueled speculation that there were canals on Mars, and furthered theories of a ninth planet within the Solar System. He founded the Lowell Observatory in Flagstaff, Arizona, and formed the beginning of the effort that led to the discovery of Pluto 14 years after his death.

== Life and career ==
=== Early life and work ===
Percival Lowell was born on March 13, 1855, in Boston, Massachusetts, the first son of Augustus Lowell and Katherine Bigelow Lowell. A member of the Brahmin Lowell family, his siblings included the poet Amy Lowell, the educator and legal scholar Abbott Lawrence Lowell, and Elizabeth Lowell Putnam, an early activist for prenatal care. They were the great-grandchildren of John Lowell and, on their mother's side, the grandchildren of Abbott Lawrence.

Percival graduated from the Noble and Greenough School in 1872 and Harvard College in 1876 with distinction in mathematics. While at Harvard he joined Delta Kappa Epsilon fraternity. At his college graduation, he gave a speech, considered very advanced for its time, on the nebular hypothesis. He was later awarded honorary degrees from Amherst College and Clark University. After graduation he ran a cotton mill for six years.

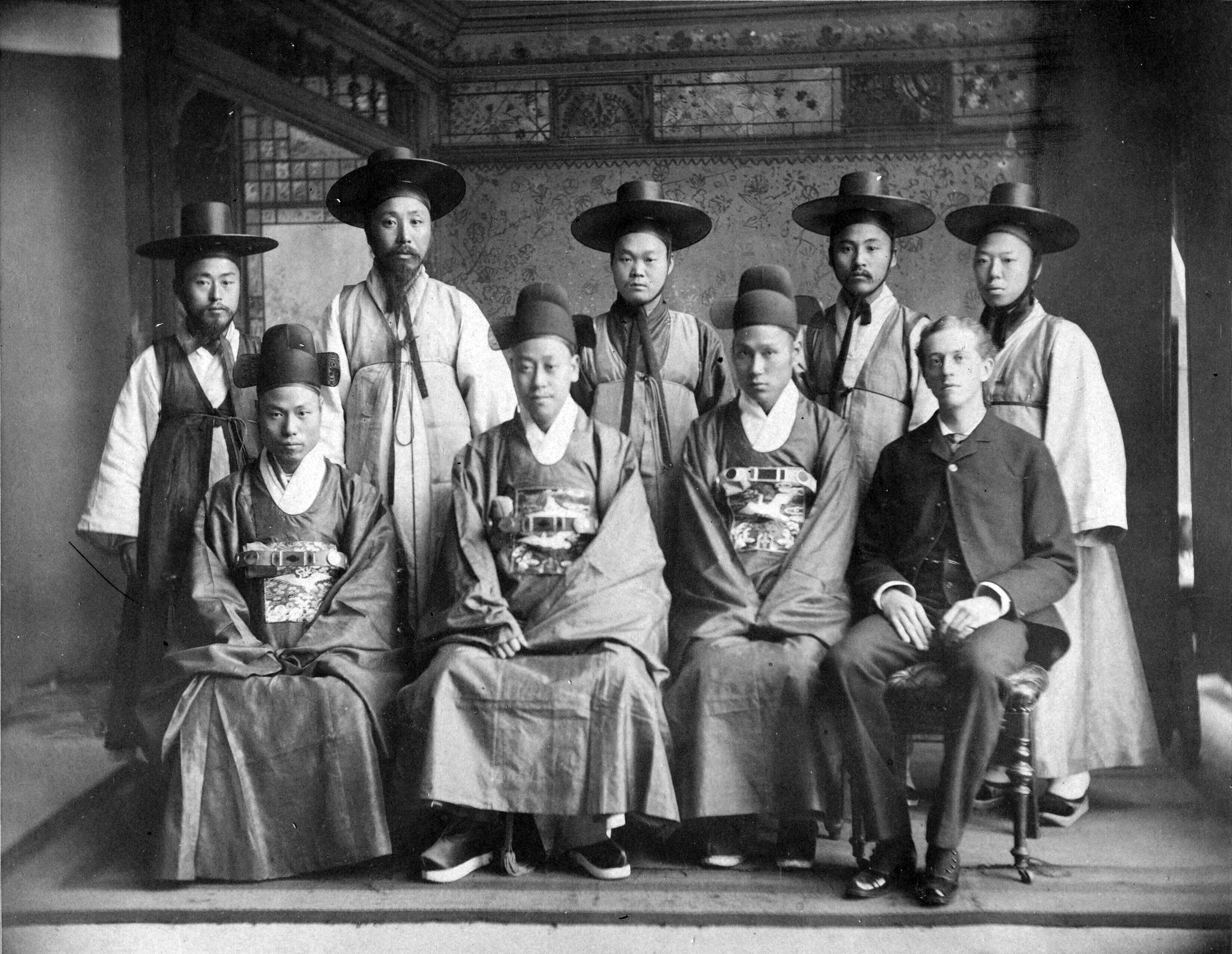
Lowell (seated, bottom right) and the special mission before departing to the United States, 1883

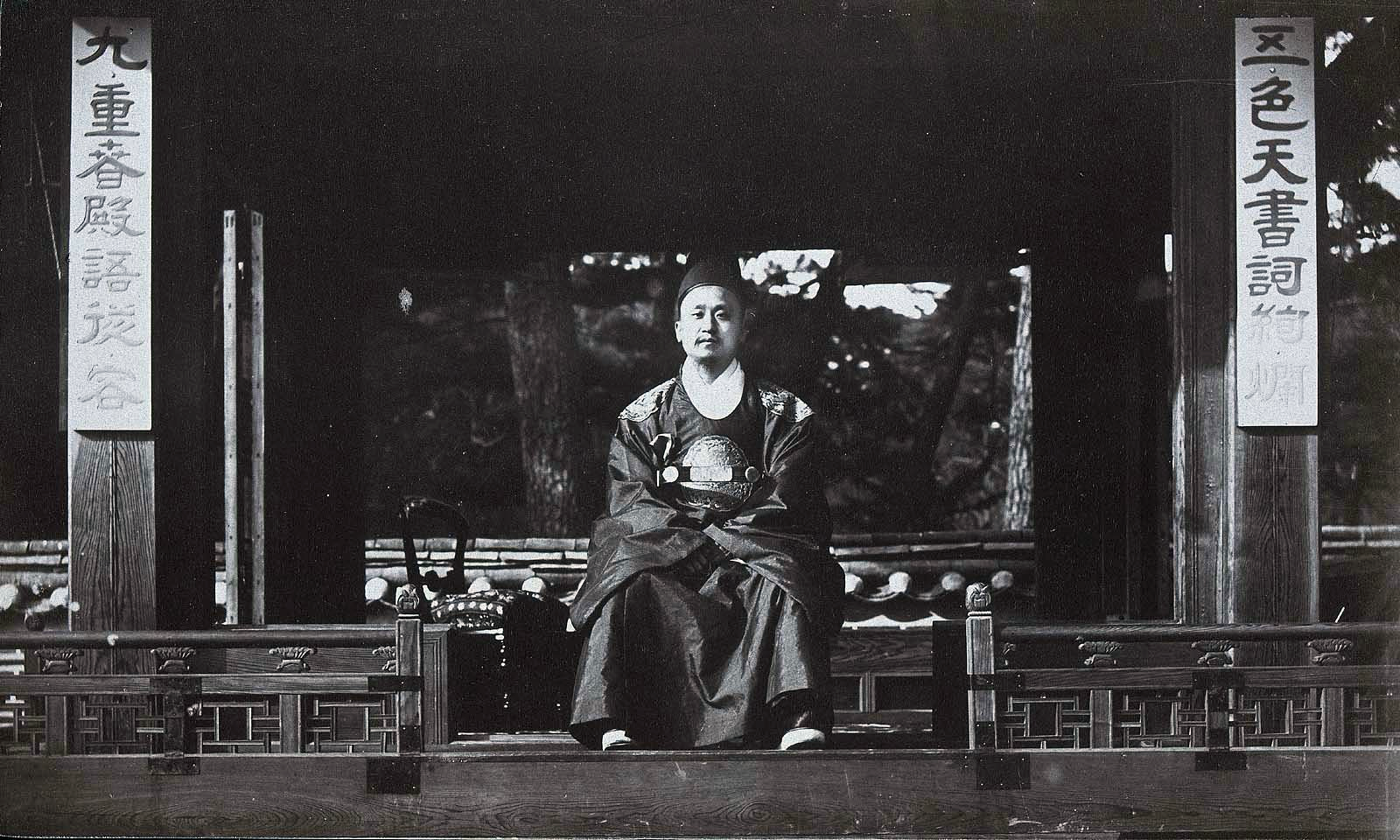
Lowell's photograph of King Gojong, 1884

In the 1880s, Lowell traveled extensively in the Far East. In August 1883, he served as a foreign secretary and counselor for a special Korean diplomatic mission to the United States. He then went to Korea and lived there from December 1883 to March 1884. In 1884, he took the earliest surviving photograph of a Korean monarch: King Gojong. He also spent significant periods of time in Japan, writing books on Japanese religion, psychology, and behavior. His texts are filled with observations and academic discussions of various aspects of Japanese life, including language, religious practices, economics, travel in Japan, and the development of personality.

Books by Lowell on the Orient include Noto: An Unexplored Corner of Japan (1891) and Occult Japan, or the Way of the Gods (1894), the latter from his third and final trip to the region. His time in Korea inspired Chosön: The Land of the Morning Calm (1886, Boston). The most popular of Lowell's books on the Orient, The Soul of the Far East (1888), contains an early synthesis of some of his ideas that, in essence, postulated that human progress is a function of the qualities of individuality and imagination. The writer Lafcadio Hearn called it a "colossal, splendid, godlike book." At his death he left with his assistant Wrexie Leonard an unpublished manuscript of a book entitled Peaks and Plateaux in the Effect on Tree Life.

After his death, Lowell's wife, Constance, contested his will granting most of his estate to the observatory, halting its work for ten years.

=== Founding of the Lowell Observatory ===
Lowell was elected a Fellow of the American Academy of Arts and Sciences in 1892. He moved back to the United States in 1893. He became determined to study Mars and astronomy as a full-time career after reading Camille Flammarion's La planète Mars. He was particularly interested in the canals of Mars, as drawn by Italian astronomer Giovanni Schiaparelli, who was director of the Milan Observatory. The Boston geologist George Russel Agassiz noted that Lowell made the decision to begin his observations after hearing that Schiaparelli began to experience failing eyesight. Beginning in the winter of 1893–94, using his wealth and influence, Lowell dedicated himself to the study of astronomy, founding the observatory which bears his name. He chose Flagstaff, Arizona Territory, as the home of his new observatory. At an altitude of over 2,100 meters (6,900 feet), with few cloudy nights, and far from city lights, Flagstaff was an excellent site for astronomical observations. This marked the first time an observatory had been deliberately located in a remote, elevated place for optimal seeing which included enhanced image quality, sharpness and steadiness. At his Flagstaff observatory Lowell favored the use of smaller telescopes rather than larger ones, believing that they were usually better for viewing fine planetary details. He was assisted in setting up his observatory by William H. Pickering, another observer of Mars who had noted the lines seen by Schiaparelli as well.

Lowell was elected to the American Philosophical Society in 1897.

In 1904, Lowell received the Prix Jules Janssen, the highest award of the Société astronomique de France, the French astronomical society. For the last 23 years of his life, astronomy, Lowell Observatory, and his and others' work at his observatory were the focal points of his life.

World War I very much saddened Lowell, who was a dedicated pacifist. This, along with some setbacks in his astronomical work (described below), undermined his health and contributed to his death from a stroke on November 12, 1916, aged 61. Lowell is buried on Mars Hill near his observatory. Lowell claimed to "stick to the church" though at least one current author describes him as an agnostic.

=== Canals of Mars ===
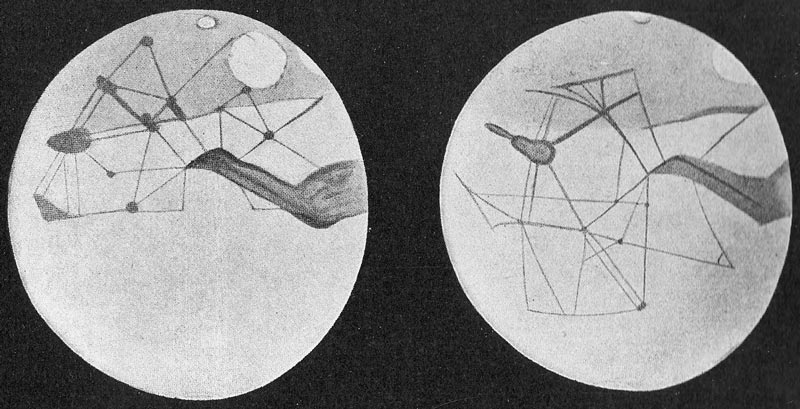
Martian canals depicted by Percival Lowell

For some fifteen years (1893 to about 1908) Lowell studied Mars extensively, making intricate drawings of the surface markings as he perceived them. Lowell published his views in three books: Mars (1895), Mars and Its Canals (1906), and Mars As the Abode of Life (1908). With these writings, Lowell more than anyone else popularized the long-held belief that these markings showed that Mars sustained intelligent life forms.

His works include a detailed description of what he termed the "non-natural features" of the planet's surface, including especially a full account of the "canals", single and double; the "oases", as he termed the dark spots at their intersections; and the varying visibility of both, depending partly on the Martian seasons. He theorized that an advanced but desperate culture had built the canals to tap Mars's polar ice caps, the last source of water on an inexorably drying planet.

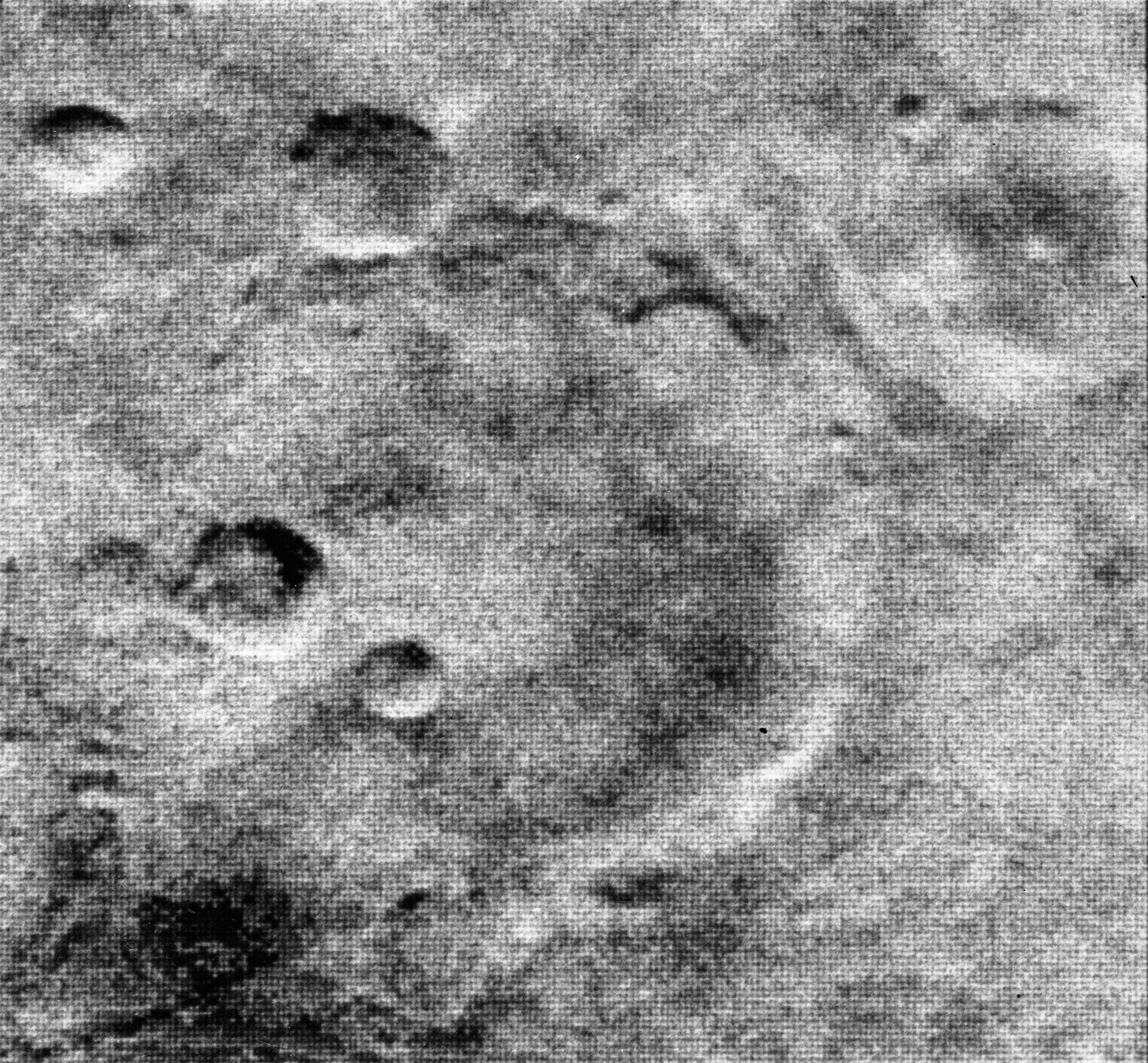
Craters on the Mars surface (frame 11) imaged by Mariner 4 as it flew by Mars in 1965

While this idea excited the public, the astronomical community was skeptical. Many astronomers could not see these markings, and few believed that they were as extensive as Lowell claimed. As a result, Lowell and his observatory were largely ostracized. The consensus was that some actual features did exist that would account for the markings. In 1909, the sixty-inch Mount Wilson Observatory telescope in Southern California allowed closer observation of the structures Lowell had interpreted as canals, and revealed irregular geological features, probably the result of natural erosion.

The existence of canal-like features was definitively disproved in the 1960s by NASA's Mariner missions. Mariner 4, 6 and 7, and the Mariner 9 orbiter (1972), did not capture images of canals but instead showed a cratered Martian surface. Today, the surface markings taken to be canals are regarded as an optical illusion. This was likely exacerbated by a common mistranslation of the Italian word canale (which means channel rather than canal, and thus does not imply a designer). Psychologist Matthew J. Sharps has argued that perception of the canals by Lowell and others could have been the result of a combination of psychological factors, including individual differences, Gestalt reconfiguration, and sociocognitive factors.

=== Venus spokes ===
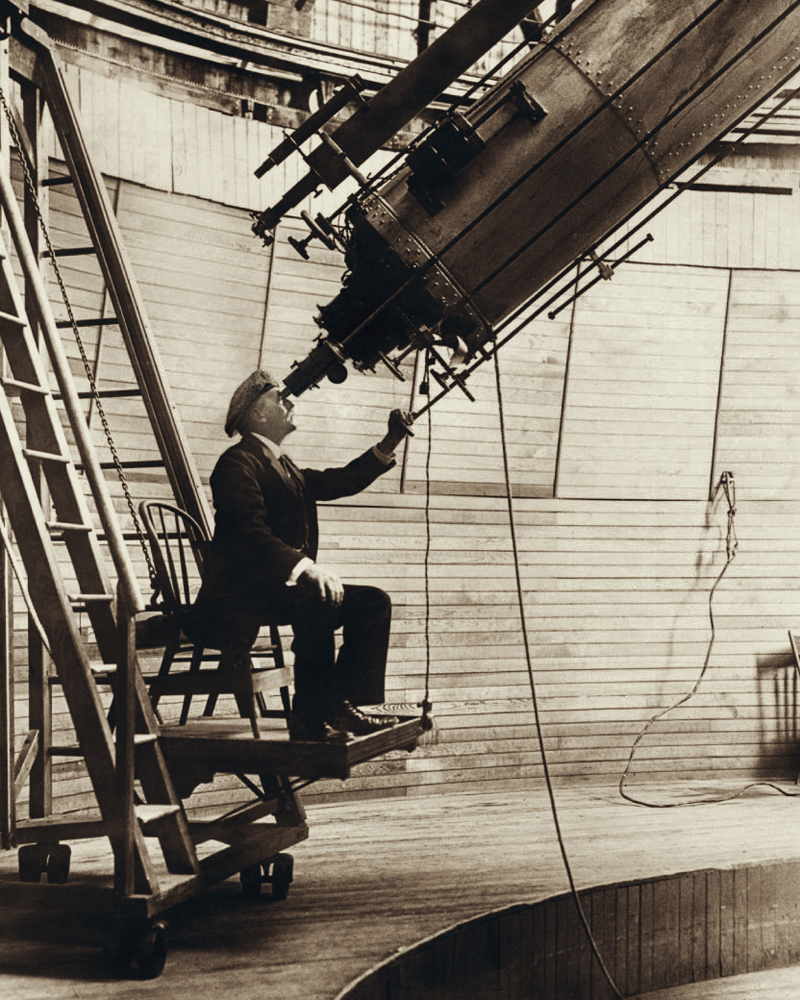
Percival Lowell in 1914, observing Venus in the daytime with the 24-inch (61 cm) Alvan Clark & Sons refracting telescope at Flagstaff, Arizona

Although Lowell was better known for his observations of Mars, he also drew maps of the planet Venus. He began observing Venus in detail in mid-1896 soon after the 61-centimetre (24-inch) Alvan Clark & Sons refracting telescope was installed at his new Flagstaff, Arizona observatory. Lowell observed the planet high in the daytime sky with the telescope's lens stopped down to 3 inches in diameter to reduce the effect of the turbulent daytime atmosphere. Lowell observed spoke-like surface features including a central dark spot, contrary to what was suspected then (and known now): that Venus has no surface features visible from Earth, being covered in an atmosphere that is opaque. It has been noted in a 2003 Journal for the History of Astronomy paper and in an article published in Sky and Telescope in July 2003 that Lowell's stopping down of the telescope created such a small exit pupil at the eyepiece, it may have become a giant ophthalmoscope giving Lowell an image of the shadows of blood vessels cast on the retina of his own eye.

=== Pluto ===
Lowell's greatest contribution to planetary studies came during the last decade of his life, which he devoted to the search for Planet X, a hypothetical planet beyond Neptune. Lowell believed that the planets Uranus and Neptune were displaced from their predicted positions by the gravity of the unseen Planet X. Lowell started a search program in 1906. A team of human computers, led by Elizabeth Williams, were employed to calculate predicted regions for the proposed planet. The program initially used a camera 5 inches (13 cm) in aperture. The small field of view of the 42-inch (110 cm) reflecting telescope rendered the instrument impractical for searching. From 1914 to 1916, a 9-inch (23 cm) telescope on loan from Sproul Observatory was used to search for Planet X. Lowell did not discover Pluto but later Lowell Observatory (observatory code 690) would photograph Pluto in March and April 1915, without realizing at the time that it was not a star.

The astronomical symbol for Pluto is a ligature combining the letters P and L.

In 1930, Clyde Tombaugh, working at the Lowell Observatory, discovered Pluto near the location expected for Planet X. Partly in recognition of Lowell's efforts, a stylized P-L monogram (♇) – the first two letters of the new planet's name and also Lowell's initials – was chosen as Pluto's astronomical symbol. However, it would subsequently emerge that the Planet X theory was mistaken.

Pluto's mass could not be determined until 1978, when its satellite Charon was discovered. This confirmed what had been increasingly suspected: Pluto's gravitational influence on Uranus and Neptune is negligible, not nearly enough to account for the discrepancies in their orbits. In 2006, Pluto was reclassified as a dwarf planet by the International Astronomical Union.

In addition, the discrepancies between the predicted and observed positions of Uranus and Neptune were found not to be caused by the gravity of an unknown planet. Rather, they were due to an erroneous value for the mass of Neptune. Voyager 2's 1989 encounter with Neptune yielded a more accurate value of its mass, and the discrepancies disappeared when using this value.

== Legacy ==
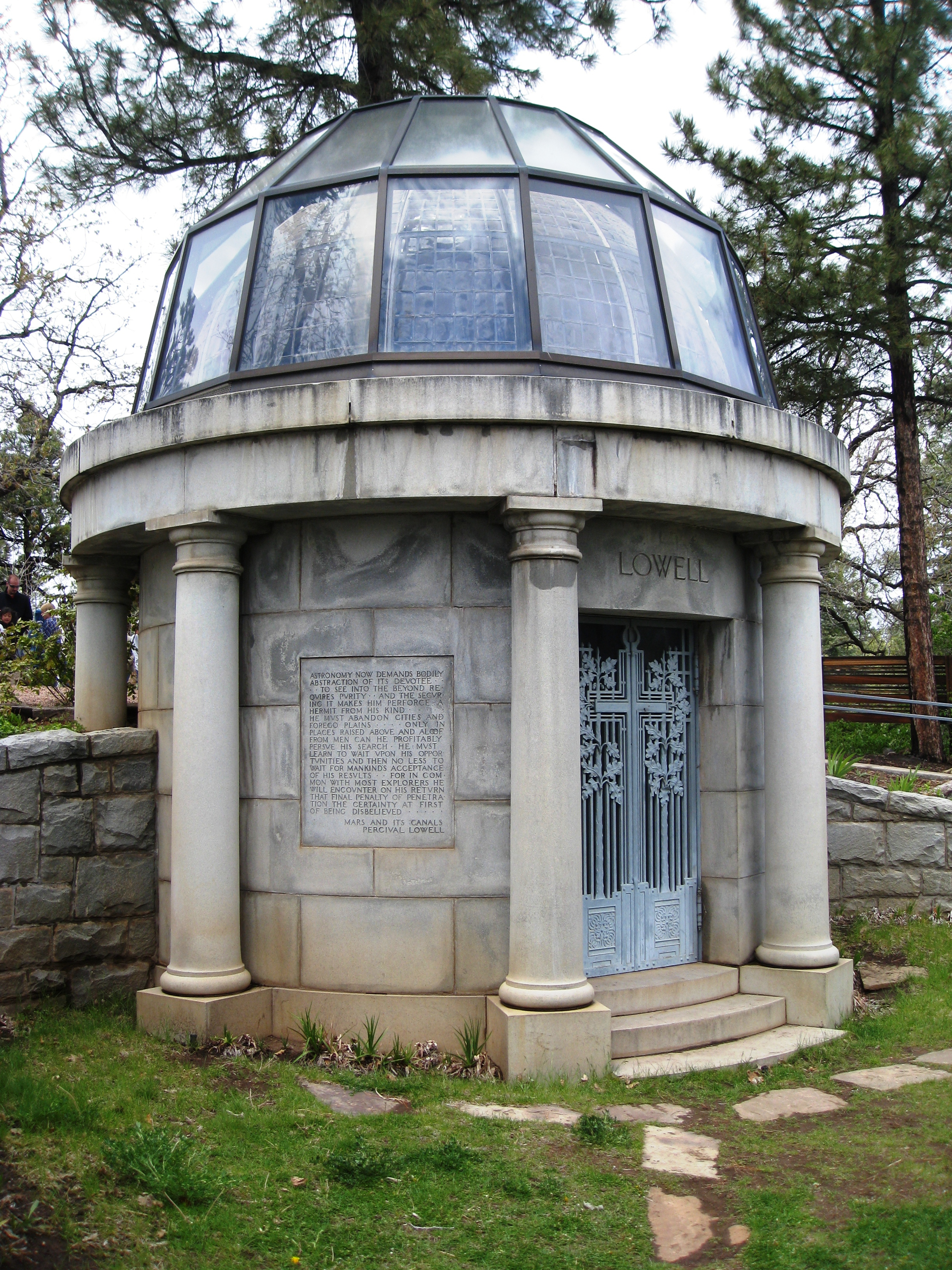
Lowell mausoleum

Coat of Arms of Percival Lowell

Although Lowell's theories of the Martian canals, of surface features on Venus, and of Planet X are now discredited, his practice of building observatories at the position where they would best function has been adopted as a principle. He also established the program and setting which made the discovery of Pluto by Clyde Tombaugh possible. Lowell has been described by other planetary scientists as "the most influential popularizer of planetary science in America before Carl Sagan".

While eventually disproved, Lowell's vision of the Martian canals as an artifact of an ancient civilization making a desperate last effort to survive, significantly influenced the development of science fiction – starting with H. G. Wells's influential 1898 novel The War of the Worlds, which made the further logical inference that creatures from a dying planet might seek to invade Earth.

The image of the dying Mars and its ancient culture was retained, in numerous versions and variations, in most science fiction works depicting Mars in the first half of the twentieth century (see Mars in fiction). Even when proven to be factually mistaken, the vision of Mars derived from his theories remains enshrined in works that remain in print and widely read as classics of science fiction.

Lowell's influence on science fiction remains strong. The canals figure prominently in Red Planet by Robert A. Heinlein (1949) and The Martian Chronicles by Ray Bradbury (1950). The canals, and even Lowell's mausoleum, heavily influence The Gods of Mars (1918) by Edgar Rice Burroughs as well as all other books in the Barsoom series.

Asteroid 1886 Lowell, discovered by Henry Giclas and Robert Schaldach in 1949, as well as the crater Lowell on the Moon and the crater Lowell on Mars, were named after him. The Lowell Regio on Pluto was also named in his honor after its discovery by the New Horizons spacecraft in 2015.

== Publications ==
- The Soul of the Far East (1888)
- Noto: An Unexplored Corner of Japan (1891)
- Occult Japan, or the Way of the Gods (1894)
- Collected Writings on Japan and Asia, including Letters to Amy Lowell and Lafcadio Hearn, 5 vols., Tokyo: Edition Synapse. ISBN 978-4-901481-48-9
- Chosön: The Land of the Morning Calm; a Sketch of Korea. Ticknor. 1886.
- Mars (1895)
- Mars and Its Canals (1906)
- Mars As the Abode of Life (1908)
- The Evolution of Worlds (1910) (Full text at The Evolution of Worlds.)

== See also ==
- Life on Mars
- Noto Peninsula
- Wrexie Leonard
