= Quinnebaugh Township, Burt County, Nebraska =

Quinnebaugh Township
- Township
- Location in Burt County
- Coordinates: 41°57′49″N 096°10′51″W
- Country: United States
- State: Nebraska
- County: Burt

Area
  - Total: 24.85 sq mi (64.36 km^{2})
  - Land: 23.4 sq mi (60.7 km^{2})
  - Water: 1.41 sq mi (3.66 km^{2}) 5.69%
- Elevation: 1,047 ft (319 m)

Population (2020)
  - Total: 48
  - Density: 2.0/sq mi (0.79/km^{2})
- GNIS feature ID: 0838203

Quinnebaugh Township is one of twelve townships in Burt County, Nebraska, United States. The population was 48 at the 2020 census. A 2021 estimate placed the township's population at 47.

== See also ==
- County government in Nebraska
