= 793 Arizona =

Main-belt asteroid

Discovery
- Discovered by: P. Lowell
- Discovery site: Lowell Observatory
- Discovery date: 9 April 1907

Designations
- Alternative designations: 1907 ZD

Orbital characteristics
- Epoch 31 July 2016 (JD 2457600.5)
- Uncertainty parameter 0
- Observation arc: 108.93 yr (39788 d)
- Aphelion: 3.1456 AU (470.58 Gm)
- Perihelion: 2.4458 AU (365.89 Gm)
- Semi-major axis: 2.7957 AU (418.23 Gm)
- Eccentricity: 0.12516
- Orbital period (sidereal): 4.67 yr (1707.4 d)
- Mean anomaly: 8.40127°
- Mean motion: 0° 12^{m} 39.06^{s} / day
- Inclination: 15.7875°
- Longitude of ascending node: 36.055°
- Argument of perihelion: 308.965°

Physical characteristics
- Mean radius: 14.475±0.45 km
- Synodic rotation period: 7.367 h, 7.399 h (0.3083 d)
- Geometric albedo: 0.1659±0.010
- Spectral type: DU:
- Absolute magnitude (H): 10.26

793 Arizona is a minor planet orbiting the Sun that was discovered April 9, 1907 by American businessman Percival Lowell at Flagstaff. It was named for the state of Arizona. The object was independently discovered on April 17, 1907, by J. H. Metcalf at Taunton. This is a main belt asteroid orbiting 2.8 AU from the Sun with a period of 4.675 yr and an eccentricity (ovalness) of 0.13. The orbital plane is inclined at an angle of 15.8° to the plane of the ecliptic.

Photometric observations at the Palmer Divide Observatory in Colorado Springs, Colorado during the winter of 2007–2008 were used to build a light curve for this asteroid. The asteroid displayed a period of 7.367±0.005 h and a brightness change of 0.25±0.02 in magnitude. It spans a diameter of approximately 29 km and is a candidate D-type asteroid with an unusual spectrum.

== See also ==
- List of minor planets: 1–1000
