= Riverside Township, Adams County, Illinois =

Township in Illinois, US

Riverside Township
- Township
- Location in Adams County

- Adams County's location in Illinois
- Coordinates: 39°59′50″N 91°25′39″W
- Country: United States
- State: Illinois
- County: Adams
- Established: November 6, 1849

Area
  - Total: 21.57 sq mi (55.9 km^{2})
  - Land: 17.39 sq mi (45.0 km^{2})
  - Water: 4.18 sq mi (10.8 km^{2}) 19.38%
- Elevation: 469 ft (143 m)

Population (2020)
  - Total: 2,103
  - Density: 120.9/sq mi (46.69/km^{2})
- Time zone: UTC-6 (CST)
  - Summer (DST): UTC-5 (CDT)
- ZIP codes: 62301, 62376
- FIPS code: 17-001-64408

Riverside Township is one of twenty-two townships in Adams County, Illinois, United States. As of the 2010 census, its population was 2,151 and it contained 965 housing units.

== Geography ==
According to the 2010 census, the township has a total area of 21.57 square miles (55.9 km^{2}), of which 17.39 square miles (45.0 km^{2}) (or 80.62%) is land and 4.18 square miles (10.8 km^{2}) (or 19.38%) is water.

=== Unincorporated towns ===
- North Quincy

=== Major highways ===
- US Route 24

=== Airports and landing strips ===
- Blickhan Landing Area

=== Rivers ===
- Mississippi River

=== Lakes ===
- Goose Lake
- Long Island Lake

== Demographics ==
As of the 2020 census there were 2,103 people, 734 households, and 596 families residing in the township. The population density was 97.28 inhabitants per square mile (37.56/km^{2}). There were 960 housing units at an average density of 44.41 units per square mile (17.15 units/km^{2}). The racial makeup of the township was 92.72% White, 0.90% African American, 0.29% Native American, 0.71% Asian, 0.00% Pacific Islander, 0.57% from other races, and 4.80% from two or more races. Hispanic or Latino of any race were 1.62% of the population.

There were 734 households, out of which 20.70% had children under the age of 18 living with them, 75.61% were married couples living together, 3.00% had a female householder with no spouse present, and 18.80% were non-families. 15.90% of all households were made up of individuals, and 11.20% had someone living alone who was 65 years of age or older. The average household size was 2.24 and the average family size was 2.45.

The township's age distribution consisted of 17.1% under the age of 18, 2.1% from 18 to 24, 13% from 25 to 44, 37.4% from 45 to 64, and 30.3% who were 65 years of age or older. The median age was 55.8 years. For every 100 females, there were 91.5 males. For every 100 females age 18 and over, there were 94.4 males.

The median income for a household in the township was $96,776, and the median income for a family was $95,921. Males had a median income of $54,426 versus $45,208 for females. The per capita income for the township was $54,679. About 1.5% of families and 3.2% of the population were below the poverty line, including 0.0% of those under age 18 and 7.2% of those age 65 or over.

Historical population
Census	Pop.	Note	%±
2010	2,151		—
2020	2,103		−2.2%
U.S. Decennial Census

== School districts ==
- Quincy Public School District 172

== Political districts ==
- Illinois' 17th congressional district
- State House District 93
- State Senate District 47
