= Riverside Township, Burt County, Nebraska =

Riverside Township
- Township
- Location in Burt County
- Coordinates: 41°51′56″N 096°10′48″W
- Country: United States
- State: Nebraska
- County: Burt

Area
  - Total: 29.68 sq mi (76.86 km^{2})
  - Land: 29.13 sq mi (75.45 km^{2})
  - Water: 0.54 sq mi (1.41 km^{2}) 1.83%
- Elevation: 1,033 ft (315 m)

Population (2020)
  - Total: 66
  - Density: 2.3/sq mi (0.87/km^{2})
- GNIS feature ID: 0838214

Riverside Township is one of twelve townships in Burt County, Nebraska, United States. The population was 66 at the 2020 census. A 2021 estimate placed the township's population at 65.

== See also ==
- County government in Nebraska
