= Lyons, Nebraska =

- City
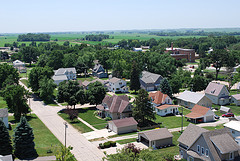
- Houses and streets in Lyons

- Location of Lyons, Nebraska
- Coordinates: 41°56′10″N 96°28′20″W
- Country: United States
- State: Nebraska
- County: Burt

Area
  - Total: 0.69 sq mi (1.79 km^{2})
  - Land: 0.68 sq mi (1.77 km^{2})
  - Water: 0.0077 sq mi (0.02 km^{2})
- Elevation: 1,293 ft (394 m)

Population (2020)
  - Total: 824
  - Density: 1,207.0/sq mi (466.01/km^{2})
- Time zone: UTC-6 (Central (CST))
  - Summer (DST): UTC-5 (CDT)
- ZIP code: 68038
- Area code: 402
- FIPS code: 31-29855
- GNIS feature ID: 2395794
- Website: lyonsne.com

Lyons is a city in Burt County, Nebraska, United States. As of the 2020 census, Lyons had a population of 824. The city is named after its founder.

== History ==
The first settlers of Lyons came in the summer of 1866. The fertile soil of the Logan Valley, combined with the commercial promise provided by access to the railroad after 1881, assured the life of the town. Incorporated in 1884, the village was named for Waldo Lyon, a prominent citizen upon whose land the plots were laid out. Residents have continued to abide by a provision in Lyons' deed stipulating that liquor not be sold within the town at risk of forfeit of the property.

The Lyons Roller Mill was erected in 1869. The three-story structure was powered by water from a dam built across Logan Creek just west of the town, and was in operation until 1931.

Many of the buildings of the town are constructed of brick manufactured in a brickyard which began operation in 1878. The swimming pool sits in the depression from which the clay was taken.

One of the finest trotting tracks in the country opened in 1891. Just one-fourth mile west of Lyons named the Kite Track. Famous horses broke world records and won large purses on this kite-shaped race track before hard times ended racing after 1893.

== Geography ==
According to the United States Census Bureau, the city has a total area of 0.69 square miles (1.79 km^{2}), of which 0.68 square miles (1.76 km^{2}) is land and 0.01 square miles (0.03 km^{2}) is water.

Lyons is on U.S. Route 77, south of the Omaha Indian Reservation and west of the Missouri River.

=== Climate ===
Climate data for Lyons, NE (1991-2020)
Month	Jan	Feb	Mar	Apr	May	Jun	Jul	Aug	Sep	Oct	Nov	Dec	Year
Average precipitation inches (mm)	0.72 (18)	0.88 (22)	1.46 (37)	3.54 (90)	4.40 (112)	4.82 (122)	3.15 (80)	4.05 (103)	3.61 (92)	2.28 (58)	1.41 (36)	1.00 (25)	31.32 (795)
Average snowfall inches (cm)	6.8 (17)	7.1 (18)	5.2 (13)	0.9 (2.3)	0.0 (0.0)	0.0 (0.0)	0.0 (0.0)	0.0 (0.0)	0.0 (0.0)	0.5 (1.3)	1.7 (4.3)	5.6 (14)	27.8 (69.9)
Average extreme snow depth inches (cm)	6 (15)	8 (20)	5 (13)	2 (5.1)	0 (0)	0 (0)	0 (0)	0 (0)	0 (0)	0 (0)	2 (5.1)	4 (10)	8 (20)
Average precipitation days (≥ 0.01 in)	4.2	4.1	5.6	8.4	10.6	8.9	7.3	7.2	6.3	6	4	4.4	77
Average snowy days (≥ 0.01)	3.4	2.7	1.8	0.5	0	0	0	0	0	0.3	1	2.4	12.1
Source: NOAA

== Demographics ==
Historical population
Census	Pop.	Note	%±
1880	90		—
1890	532		491.1%
1900	847		59.2%
1910	865		2.1%
1920	1,025		18.5%
1930	985		−3.9%
1940	1,033		4.9%
1950	1,011		−2.1%
1960	974		−3.7%
1970	1,177		20.8%
1980	1,214		3.1%
1990	1,144		−5.8%
2000	963		−15.8%
2010	851		−11.6%
2020	824		−3.2%
U.S. Decennial Census

=== 2010 census ===
As of the census of 2010, there were 851 people, 395 households, and 228 families residing in the city. The population density was 1,251.5 inhabitants per square mile (483.2/km^{2}). There were 457 housing units at an average density of 672.1 per square mile (259.5/km^{2}). The racial makeup of the city was 96.7% White, 0.1% African American, 0.9% Native American, 0.2% Pacific Islander, 1.3% from other races, and 0.7% from two or more races. Hispanic or Latino of any race were 3.2% of the population.

There were 395 households, of which 19.2% had children under the age of 18 living with them, 48.6% were married couples living together, 6.8% had a female householder with no husband present, 2.3% had a male householder with no wife present, and 42.3% were non-families. 37.5% of all households were made up of individuals, and 23.1% had someone living alone who was 65 years of age or older. The average household size was 2.05 and the average family size was 2.66.

The median age in the city was 51.7 years. 16.1% of residents were under the age of 18; 7.5% were between the ages of 18 and 24; 16.8% were from 25 to 44; 29.5% were from 45 to 64; and 30.1% were 65 years of age or older. The gender makeup of the city was 45.8% male and 54.2% female.

=== 2000 census ===
As of the census of 2000, there were 963 people, 423 households, and 280 families residing in the city. The population density was 1,377.2 inhabitants per square mile (531.7/km^{2}). There were 474 housing units at an average density of 677.9 per square mile (261.7/km^{2}). The racial makeup of the city was 98.13% White, 0.31% African American, 0.21% Native American, 0.10% Asian, 0.10% Pacific Islander, 0.93% from other races, and 0.21% from two or more races. Hispanic or Latino of any race were 5.19% of the population.

There were 423 households, out of which 25.3% had children under the age of 18 living with them, 52.0% were married couples living together, 10.6% had a female householder with no husband present, and 33.8% were non-families. 31.0% of all households were made up of individuals, and 21.3% had someone living alone who was 65 years of age or older. The average household size was 2.25 and the average family size was 2.80.

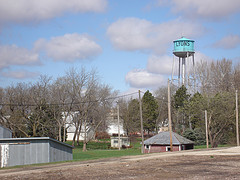
Former water tower in Lyons

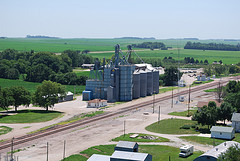
Railroad tracks in Lyons

In the city, the population was spread out, with 24.1% under the age of 18, 5.0% from 18 to 24, 21.1% from 25 to 44, 22.4% from 45 to 64, and 27.4% who were 65 years of age or older. The median age was 45 years. For every 100 females, there were 83.8 males. For every 100 females age 18 and over, there were 78.3 males.

The median income for a household in the city was $28,804, and the median income for a family was $35,625. Males had a median income of $27,563 versus $20,250 for females. The per capita income for the city was $16,368. About 6.7% of families and 9.2% of the population were below the poverty line, including 10.3% of those under age 18 and 8.2% of those age 65 or over.

== Points of Interest ==
=== Center for Rural Affairs ===
Lyons is home to the Center for Rural Affairs, a private non-profit organization. The organization's mission statement is: "Establish strong rural communities, social and economic justice, environmental stewardship, and genuine opportunity for all while engaging people in decisions that affect the quality of their lives and the future of their communities." It was established in Walthill, Nebraska in 1973, and moved to Lyons in 2004.

=== Storefront Theater ===
The Storefront Theater is located on Main Street in Lyons. It is one of four projects that are a part of the Byway of Art project created through a $200,000 ArtPlace America grant awarded to the Center for Rural Affairs. The Byway of Art project was created by former Lyons resident Adele Phillips and conceptual artist Matthew Mazzotta. The Storefront Theater creates a seating and performance area on the street. When not in use the structure appears to be a typical storefront. However, what appears to be a standard building consists of a false facade that lowers down toward the street and over the sidewalk. Bleachers behind the storefront theater pull out for seating. The Storefront Theater was selected as part of the Americans for the Arts 2016 Public Art Network Year in Review program.

== See also ==
- Autovon
