= Geography of Pluto =

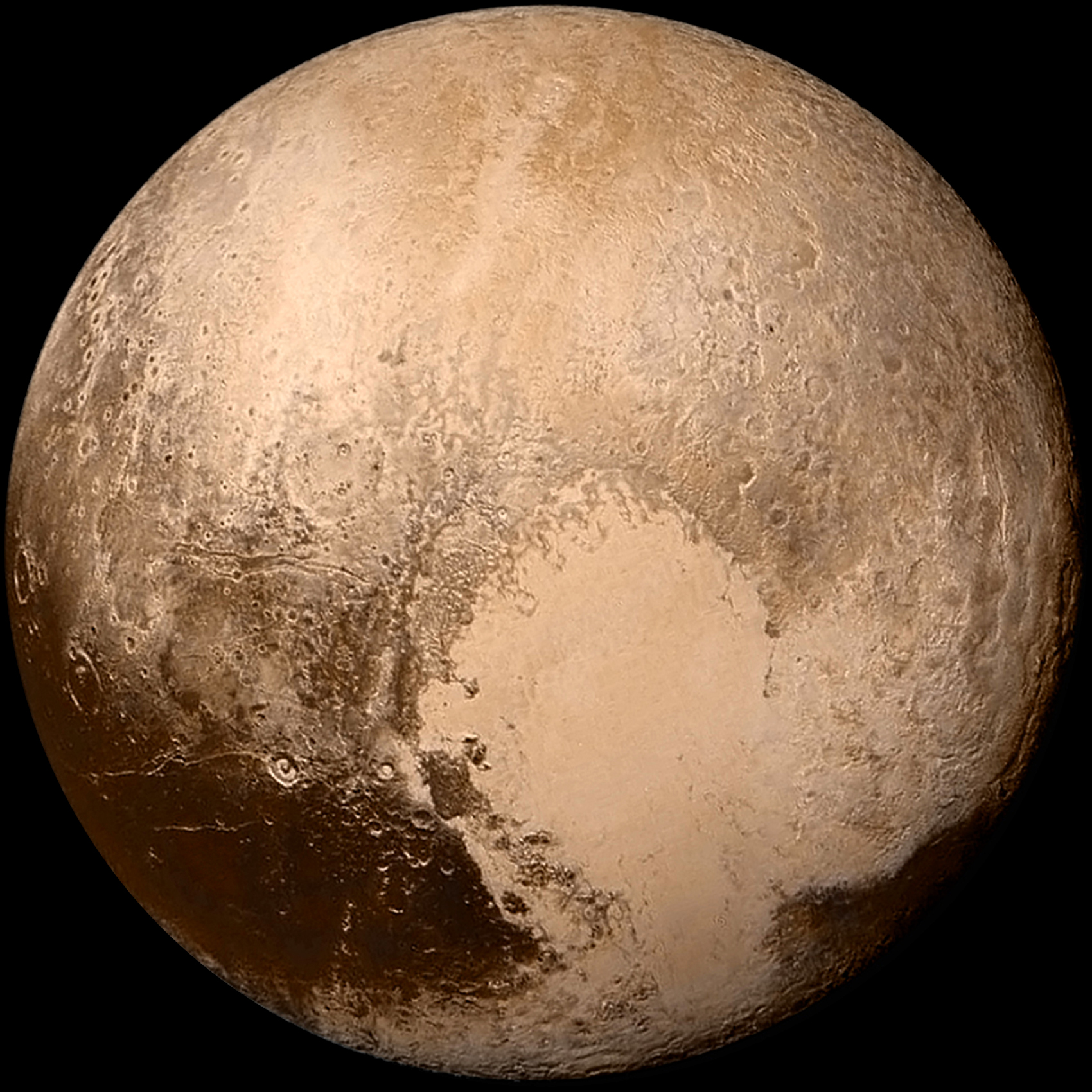
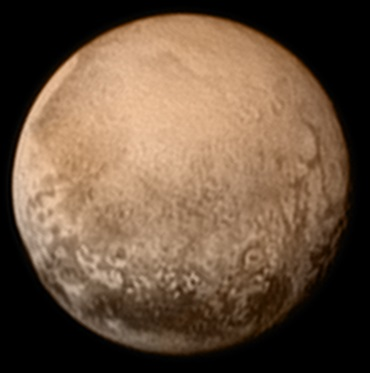
Pluto as viewed by the New Horizons spacecraft
(context; color; July 2015)

The geography of Pluto refers to the study and mapping of physical features across the dwarf planet Pluto. On 14 July 2015, the New Horizons spacecraft became the first spacecraft to fly by Pluto. During its brief flyby, New Horizons made detailed geographical measurements and observations of Pluto and its moons.

== Coordinate system orientation ==
Pluto may be defined as having retrograde rotation and an axial tilt of 60 degrees, or prograde rotation and a tilt of 120 degrees. Following the latter convention (the right-hand rule), the hemisphere currently in daylight is the northern one, with much of the southern hemisphere in darkness. This is the convention used by the International Astronomical Union (IAU) and the New Horizons team, and their maps put the sunlit hemisphere on top. However, older sources may define Pluto's rotation as retrograde and therefore the sunlit side as the southern hemisphere. East and West are also swapped between the two conventions.

The prime meridian of Pluto is defined as the longitude facing Charon.

== Topographical features ==
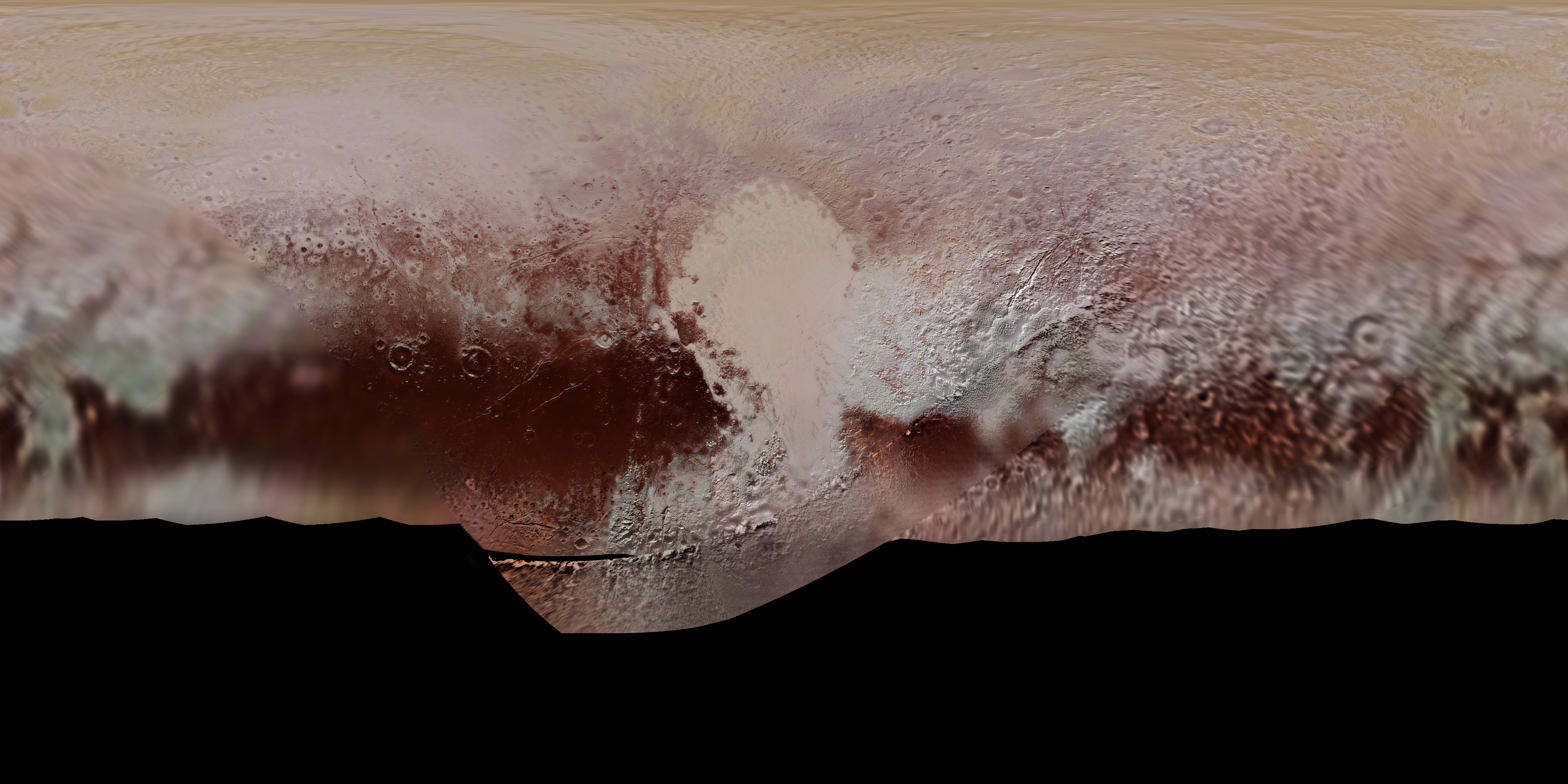
The portions of Pluto's surface mapped by New Horizons (in enhanced color). Center is 180 degrees longitude (diametrically opposite the moon Charon). The bright area in the center is Tombaugh Regio. The dark area to the west is Belton Regio. The series of dark areas to the east are the "Brass Knuckles".

The following names were originally proposed by the New Horizons discovery team. These names were variously taken from historical figures involved in the study of Pluto, notable space exploration missions, and a variety of chthonic deities or demons, some from ancient mythology and others from modern popular culture. While several of these names have been canonized by the IAU as of 2017, most remain informal classifications that have yet to be considered.

=== Tombaugh Regio ===
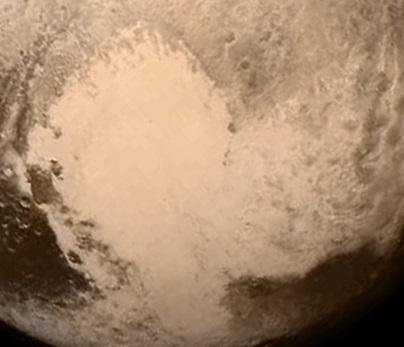
Tombaugh Regio, as viewed by New Horizons 13 July 2015

Tombaugh Regio (nicknamed "The Heart") is a large, light-colored topographical region, formed in the shape of a heart, named after the modern discoverer of Pluto, Clyde Tombaugh. The two top lobes of the heart are distinct geological features, both having a bright and whiteish appearance, with the western lobe (called Sputnik Planitia – a vast plain of nitrogen and other ices) being smoother than the eastern lobe. The heart is about 1,590 km (990 mi) across. The region contains two 3,400 m (11,000 ft) peaks composed of water-ice along its southwestern edge, Hillary Montes and Tenzing Montes. The lack of craters in the region suggests that its surface is less than 100 million years old, hence the speculation that Pluto is probably geologically active. Subsequent data indicated that features near the western edges of the region (an area about the size of Texas) show evidence of "exotic ice flow", similar to melting glaciers, rich in methane, carbon monoxide, and nitrogen ices. Potentially recent glacial activity, near Belton Regio, is suggested by the presence of lighter-hued material overlaid on top of darker, more ancient portions; according to Lillian Gipson at NASA, "...In the southernmost region of the heart, adjacent to the dark equatorial region, it appears that ancient, heavily-cratered terrain (informally named “Cthulhu Regio”) has been invaded by much newer icy deposits."

=== The Brass Knuckles ===
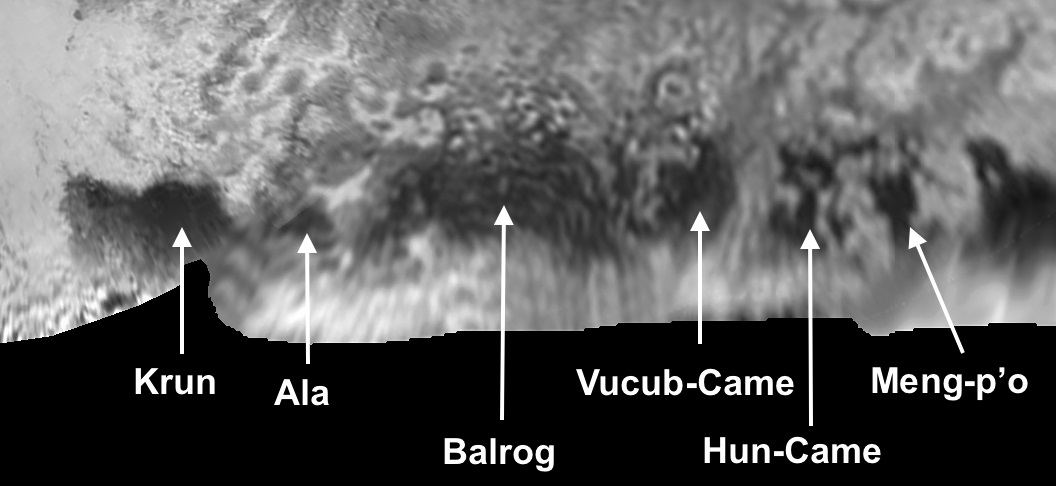
The "Brass Knuckles" region of Pluto. Meng-p'o is at the zero meridian; to the east is the 'tail' of Belton Regio. Note that the Safronov Regio is labeled as "Krun" in this image.

A series of semi-regularly spaced dark spots with irregular boundaries are nicknamed the Brass Knuckles. They average about 480 km (300 mi) in diameter and are located along the equator between the Heart and the tail of the Whale. The brass knuckles are separated from one another by tall uplands. There are also many canyons running through them and through the surrounding mountains that are hundreds of miles long and several miles deep. From west (south of Tombaugh Regio) to east (west of the Whale's tail), the Knuckles are:

- Safronov Regio (formerly known as Krun Macula), after Russian astronomer Viktor Safronov
- Sharaf Regio (formerly known as Ala Macula), after Soviet astronomer Shafika Gil’mievna Sharaf
- Harrington Regio (formerly known as Balrog Macula), after American astronomer Robert Sutton Harrington
- Vucub-Came Macula and Hun-Came Macula, after the two leading death gods in the Popol Vuh text of the K'iche' Maya
- Meng-p'o Macula, after a goddess from Chinese Buddhism who caused the dead to forget their past lives

=== Belton Regio ===
Belton Regio (formerly called Cthulhu Macula or Cthulhu Regio), nicknamed The Whale after its shape, is an elongated, dark region along Pluto's equator named in honor of astronomer Michael J. Belton, and was informally named after the fictional deity from the works of H. P. Lovecraft. It is 2,990 km (1,860 mi) long and is the largest dark feature on Pluto. It is the largest of the dark regions (Brass Knuckles) that span Pluto's equator. The dark color of the area is speculated to be the result of a "tar" made of complex hydrocarbons called tholins covering the surface, formed from methane and nitrogen in the atmosphere interacting with ultraviolet light and cosmic rays. The presence of a large number of craters within Belton indicates that it is perhaps billions of years old, in contrast to the adjacent bright, craterless Sputnik Planitia, which may be as little as 100 million years old.

=== Dune fields ===
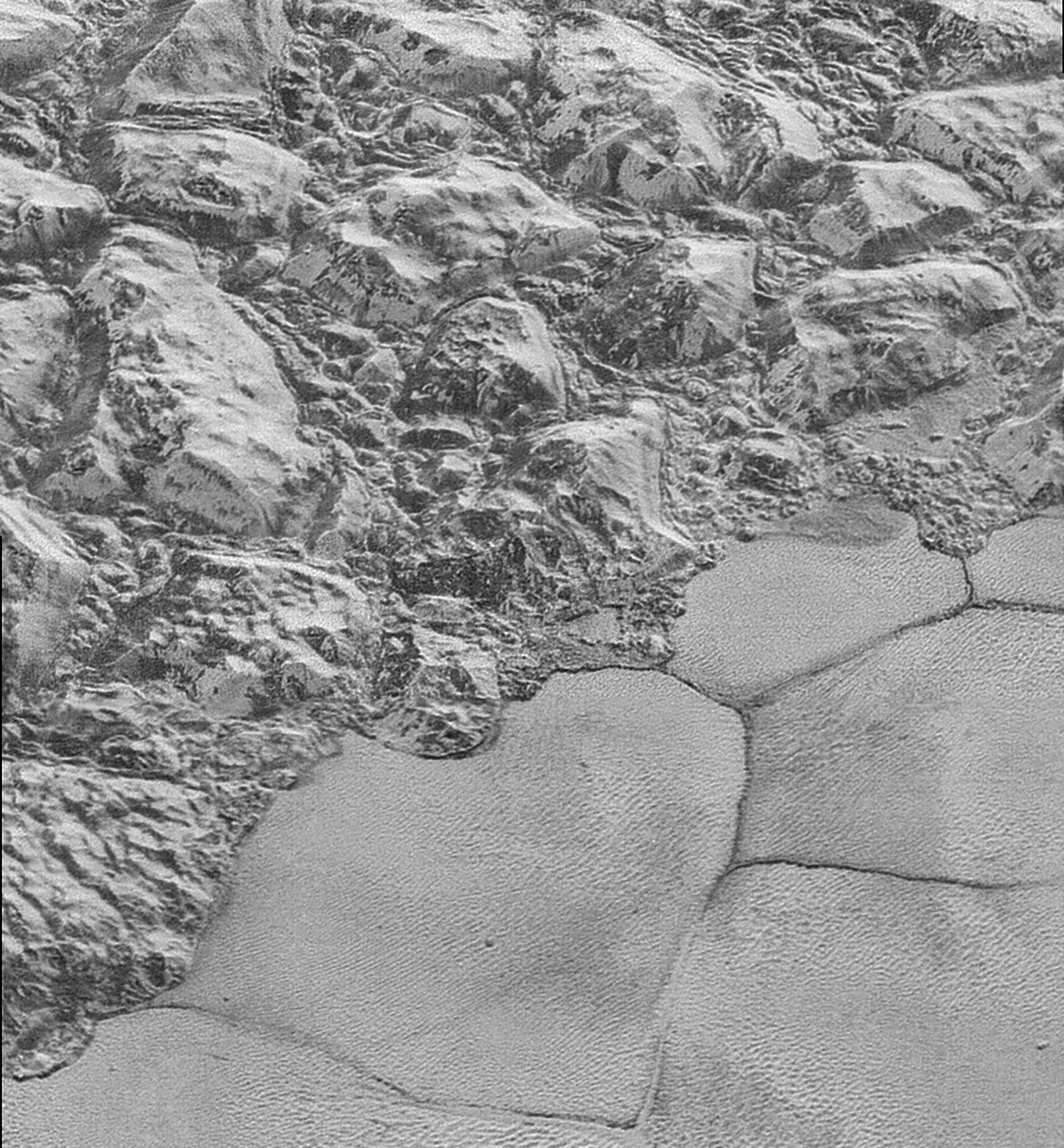
Dune fields in Sputnik Planitia near the foothills of Al-Idrisi Montes

In the Western part of Sputnik Planitia near Al-Idrisi Montes, there are fields of transverse dunes formed by the winds, which blow from the center of Sputnik Planitia in the direction of surrounding mountings. The dune wavelengths are in the range of 0.4–1 km and they likely consist of methane ice particles 200–300 μm in size. The particles are lofted above the surface when the nitrogen ice sublimates under solar irradiation. After that, they are moved by gentle winds blowing with 1–10 m/s speeds despite generally low atmospheric pressure of about 15 μbar.

== Nomenclature ==
The Working Group for Planetary System Nomenclature of the International Astronomical Union (IAU) is responsible for assigning official names to surface features on Pluto. On 7 September 2017, the first 14 names were officially approved by the IAU.

As of August 2015, the New Horizons science team derives informal names from the following themes: explorers, space missions, spacecraft, scientists and engineers; fictional explorers, travellers, vessels, destinations, and origins; authors and artists who have envisioned exploration; and fictional underworlds, underworld beings, and travellers to the underworld. The New Horizons science team invited members of the public to propose names and vote on them before the spacecraft's arrival.

Formally and informally named geographic features

== Gallery ==
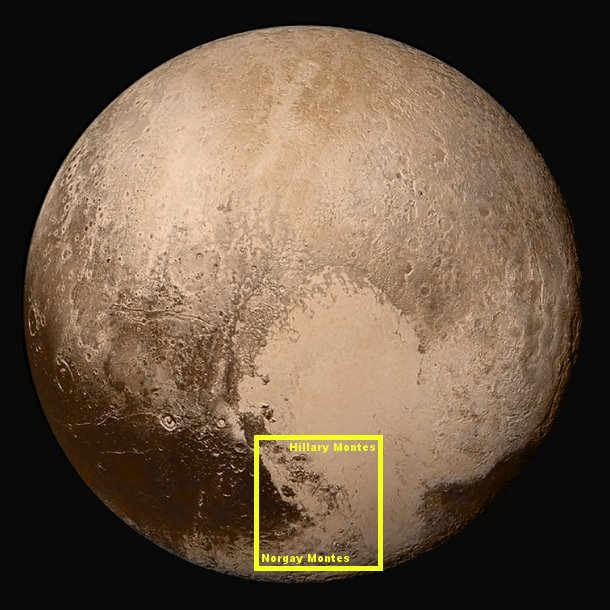
Pluto – Hillary Montes and Tenzing Montes are boxed
(context; 14 July 2015).

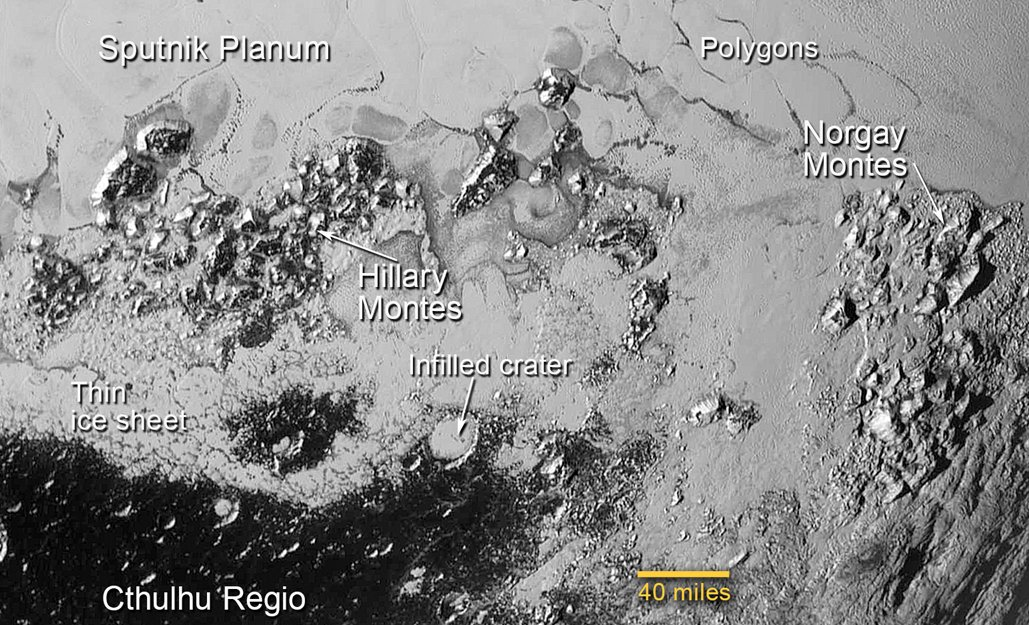
Hillary Montes and Tenzing Montes
(14 July 2015).

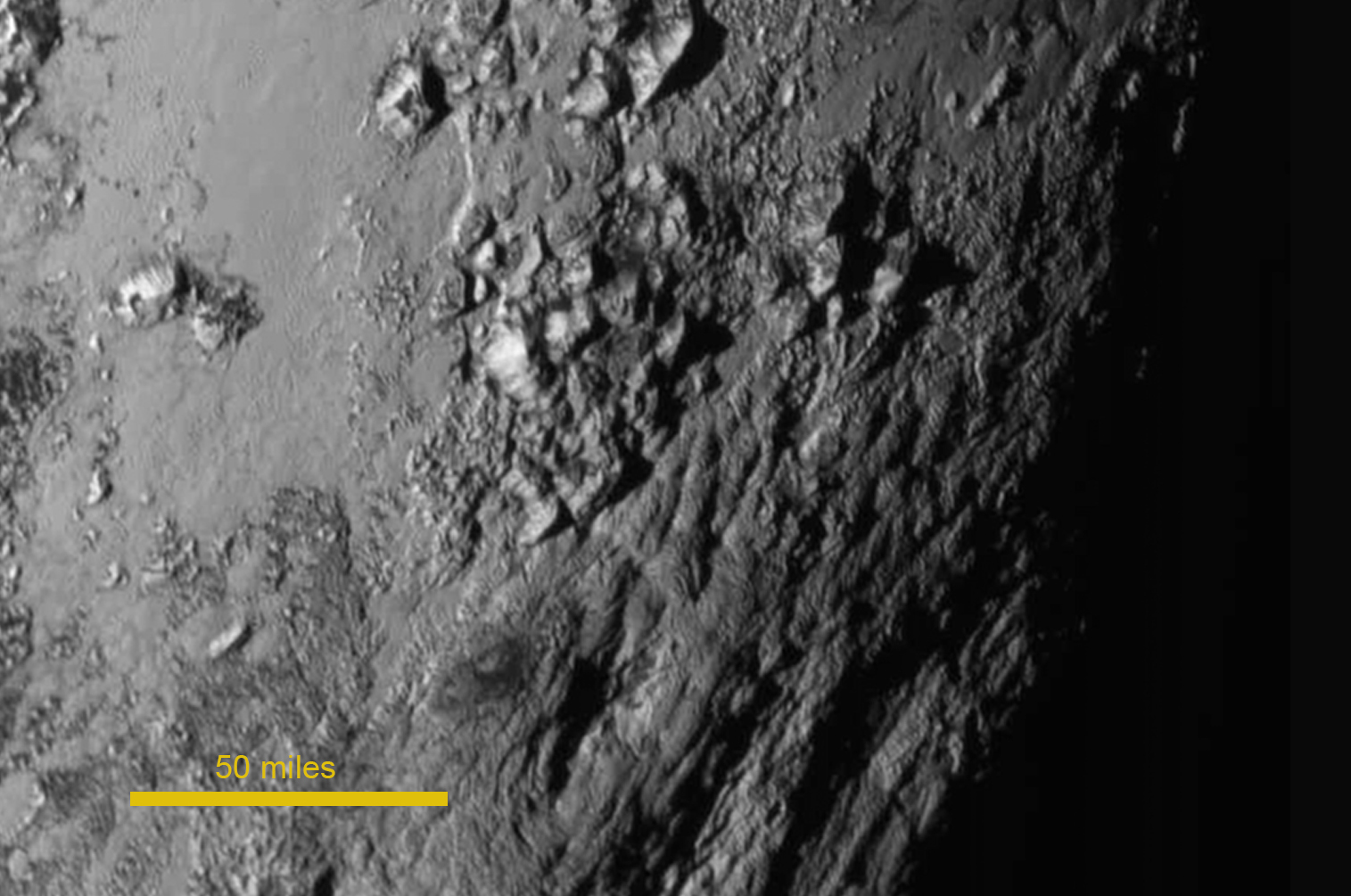
Tenzing Montes south of Tombaugh Regio
(14 July 2015).

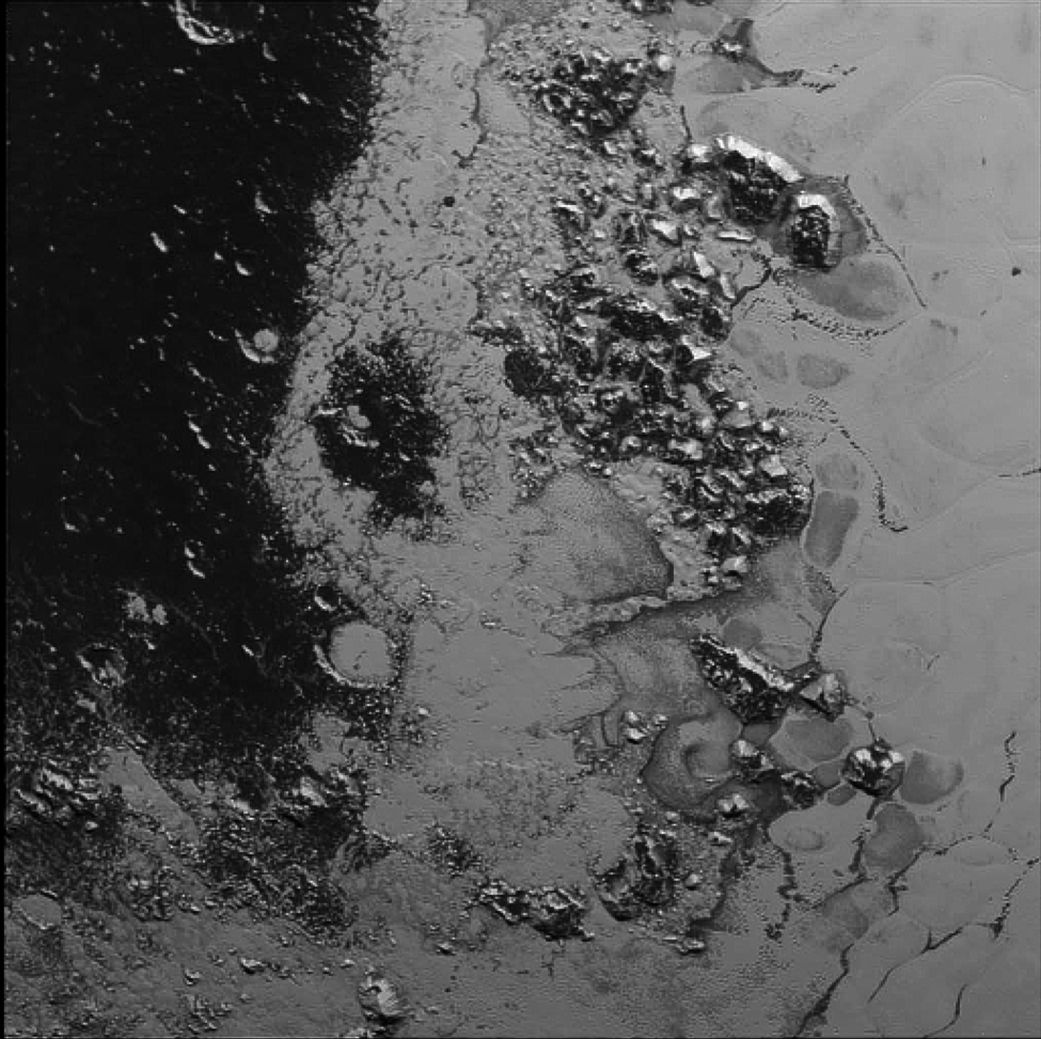
Hillary Montes southwest of Tombaugh Regio
(14 July 2015).

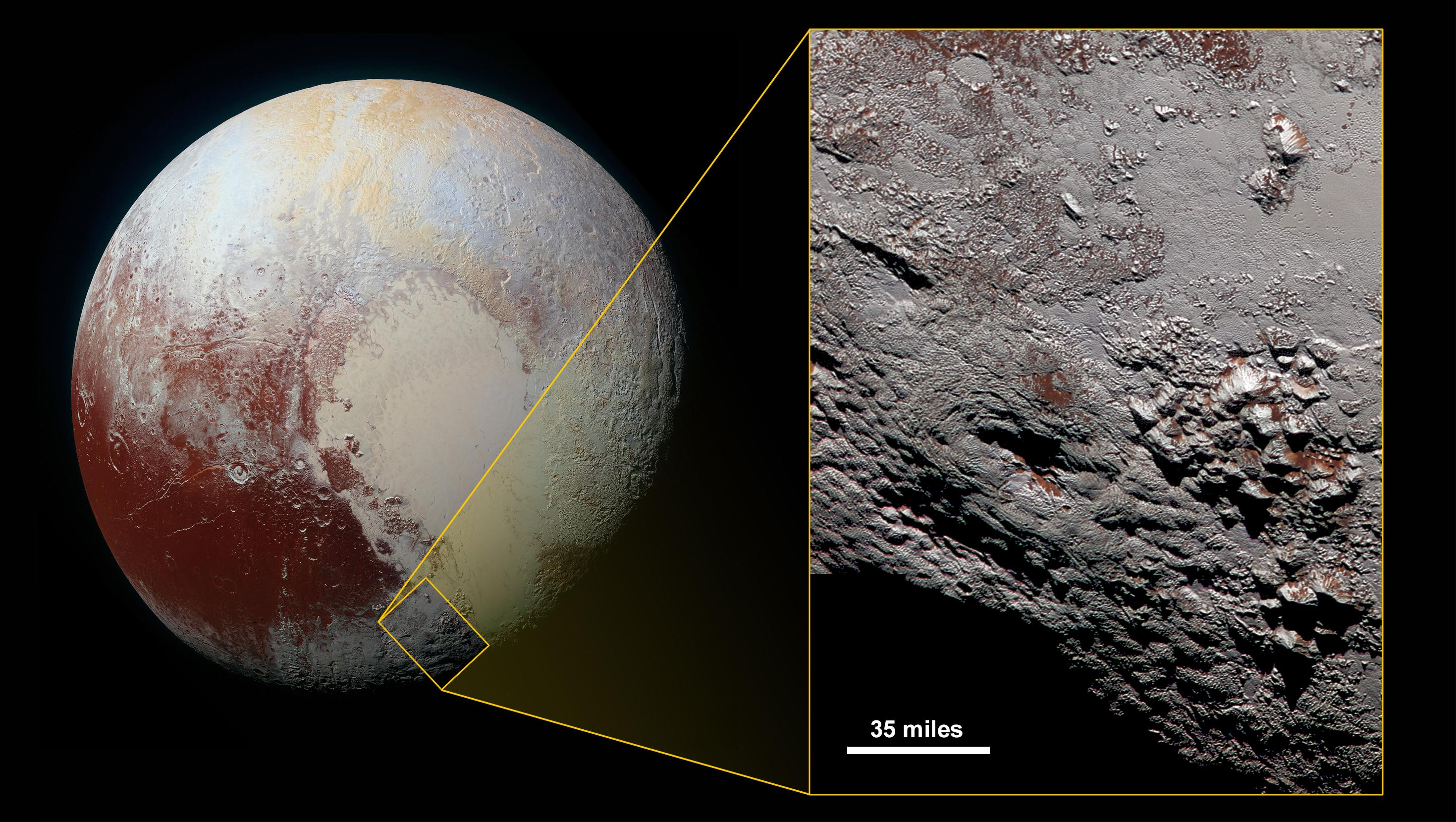
Pluto – Wright Mons
(context; 14 July 2015).

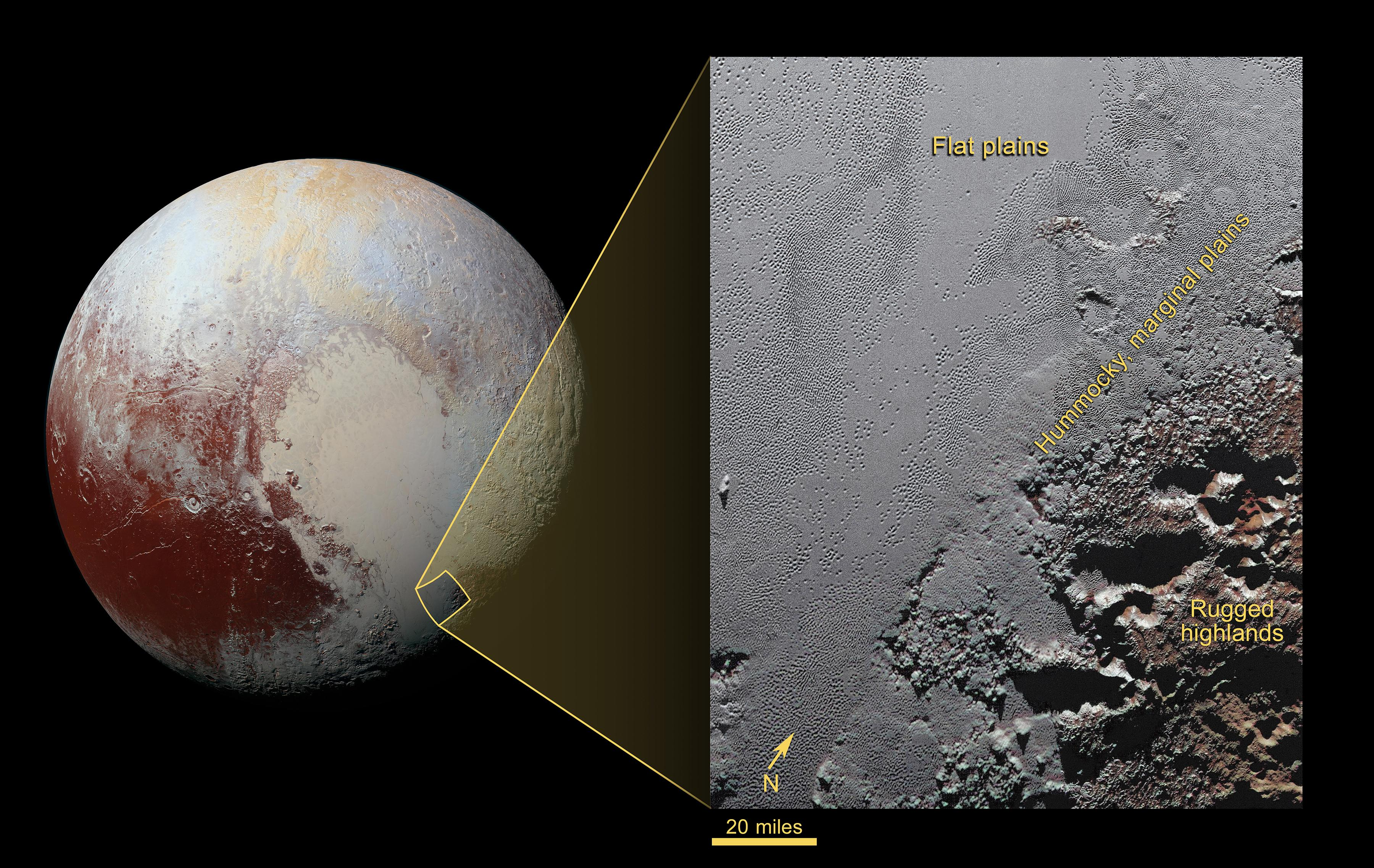
Pluto – Krun Macula
(context; 14 July 2015).
Pluto – highest-resolution images

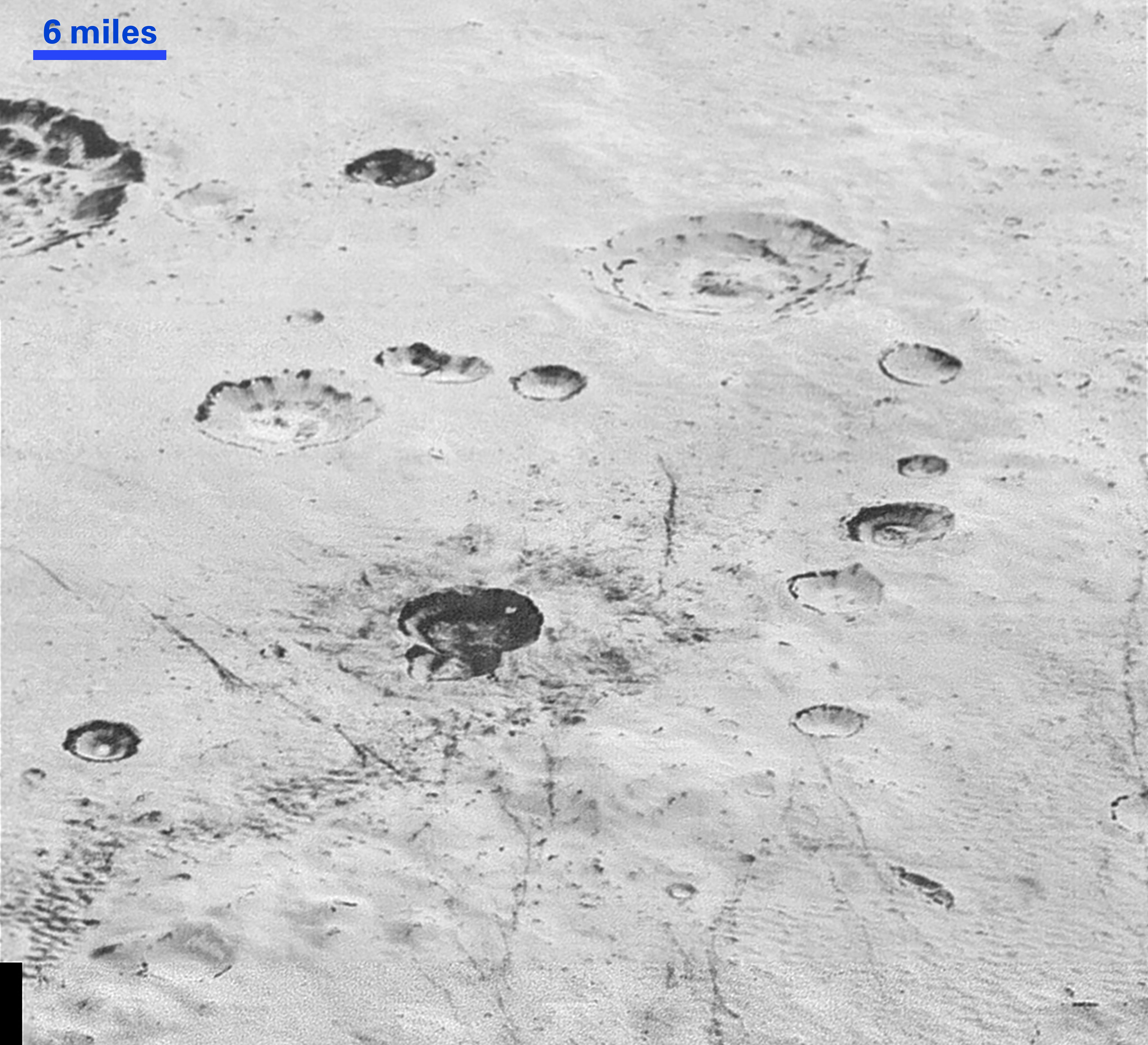
Burney Basin – more northerly

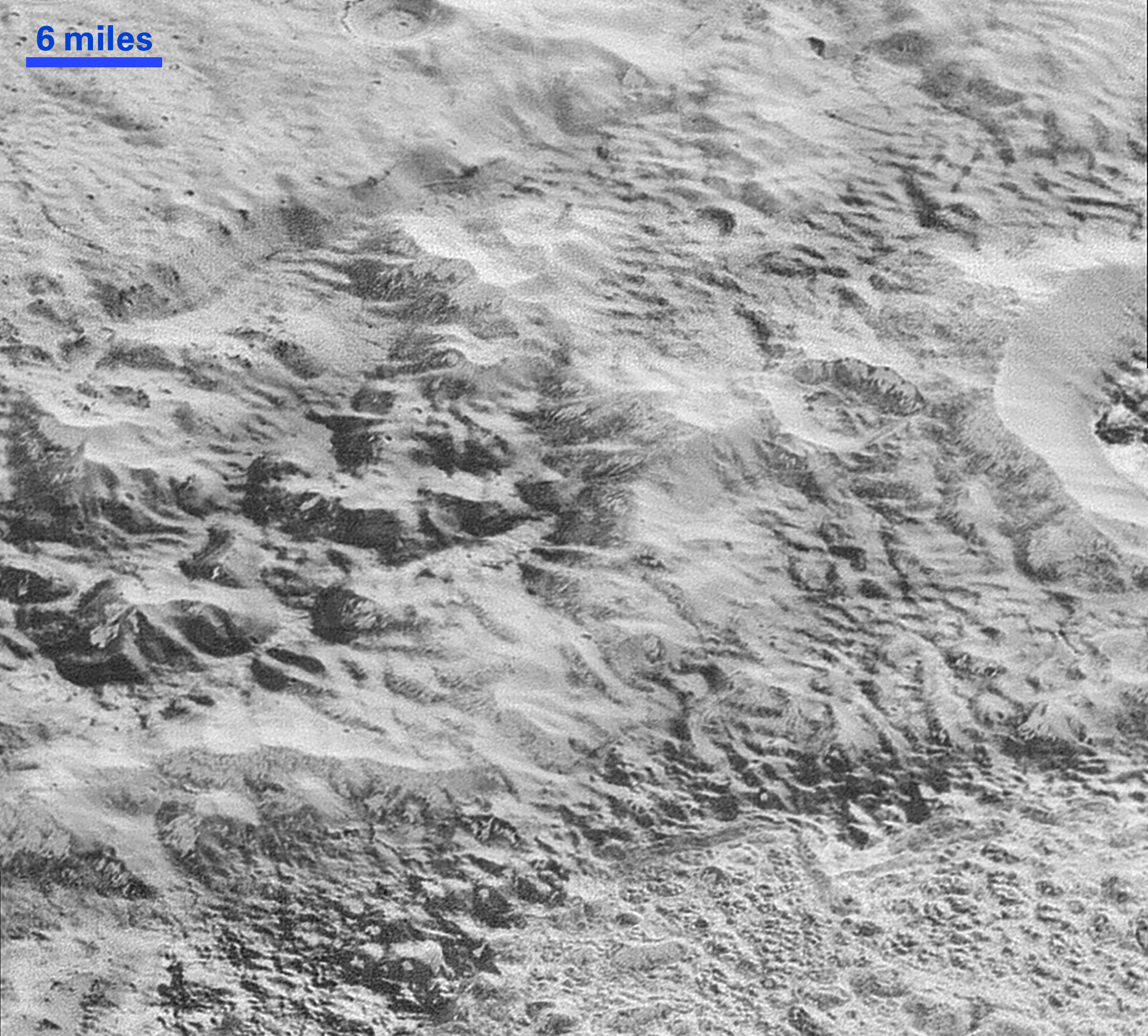
Mountains – north

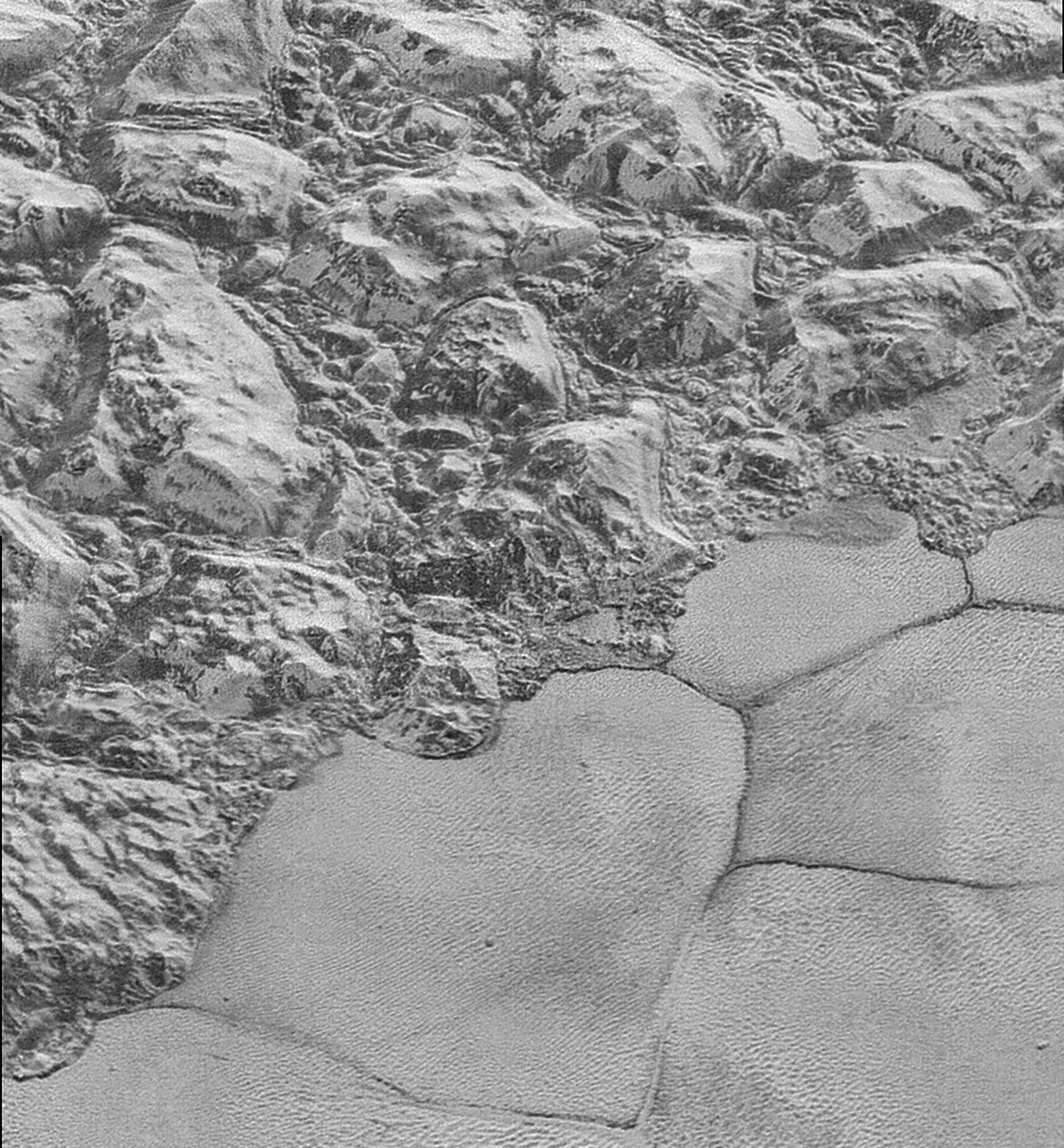
Sputnik Planitia – shoreline

(14 July 2015; released 5 December 2015)

=== Videos ===
Pluto flyover (14 July 2015)

(00:30; released 18 September 2015)

(00:50; released 5 December 2015)

== See also ==
- Geology of Pluto
- List of geological features on Pluto
