= Safronov Regio =

Equatorial dark region on Pluto

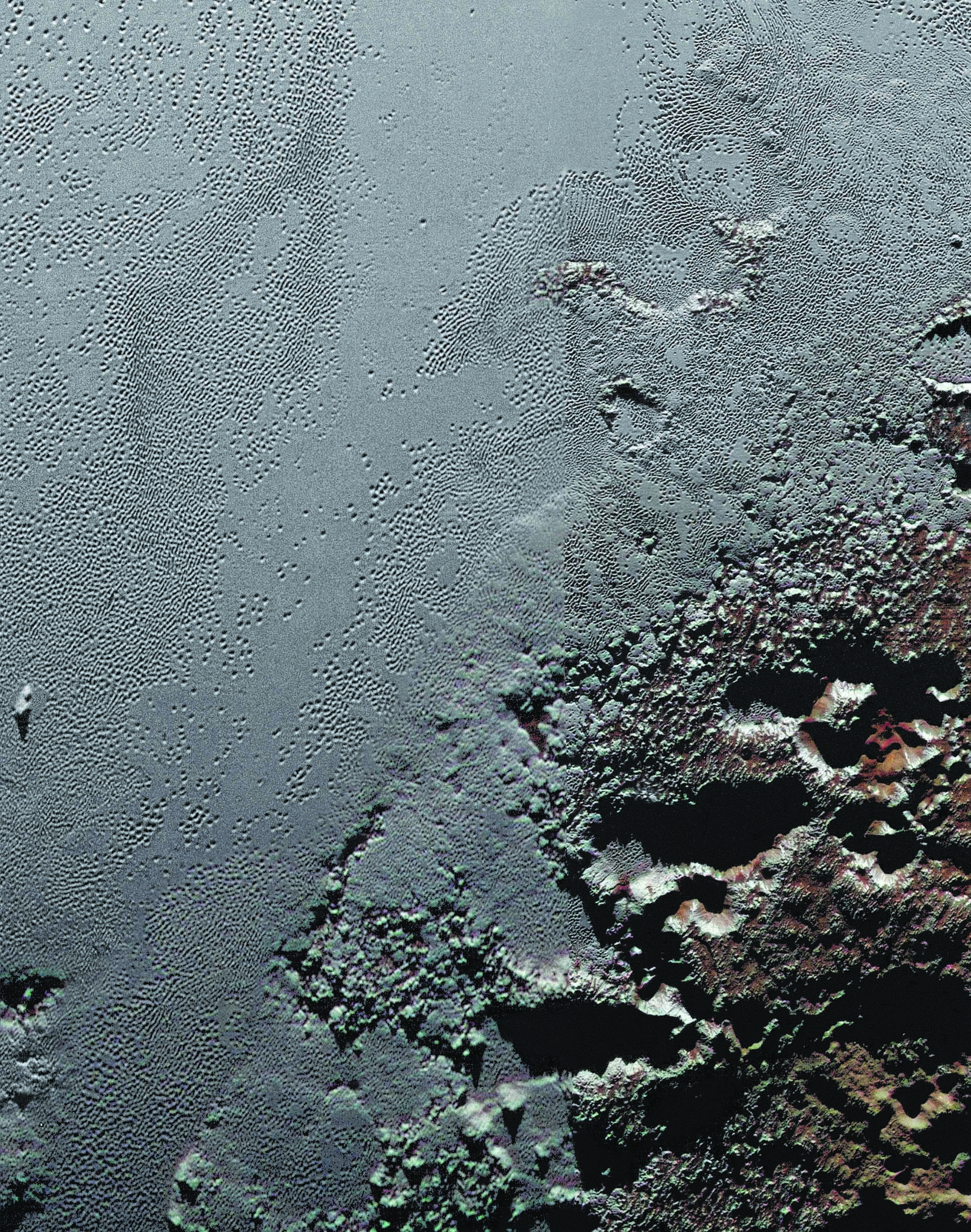
- Enhanced color view of Safronov Regio's western border with Sputnik Planitia
- Location: Pluto
- Coordinates: 13.36°S 150.51°W
- Diameter: ~740 km (460 mi)
- Discoverer: New Horizons
- Eponym: Viktor Safronov

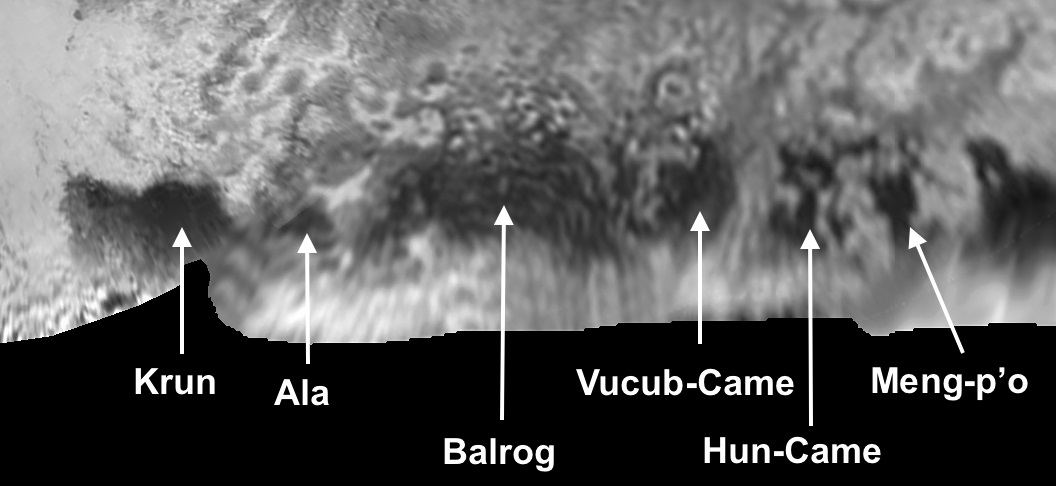
The Brass Knuckles chain of equatorial dark regions on Pluto, with Safronov Regio labeled as "Krun"

Safronov Regio (formerly Krun Macula) is the westernmost of the "Brass Knuckles", a series of equatorial dark regions on Pluto.

== Observation and naming ==
Safronov Regio was first observed as the New Horizons spacecraft approached Pluto and its system of moons. As Pluto rotated, a series of equatorial dark regions were observed and informally nicknamed the Brass Knuckles, with Safronov Regio being the westermost of the dark regions. It was initially informally named Krun Macula after Krun, the greatest of the five Mandaean lords of the underworld. However, the International Astronomical Union (IAU) instead officially approved the name Safronov Regio in honor of Russian astronomer Viktor Safronov, an early proponent of the planetesimal hypothesis for Solar System formation. The name was approved on 22 September 2023.

== Description ==
Safronov Regio is the third largest equatorial dark region on Pluto, after Belton Regio and Harrington Regio. It extends nearly to 180 degrees longitude, the Plutonian longitude opposite Charon.

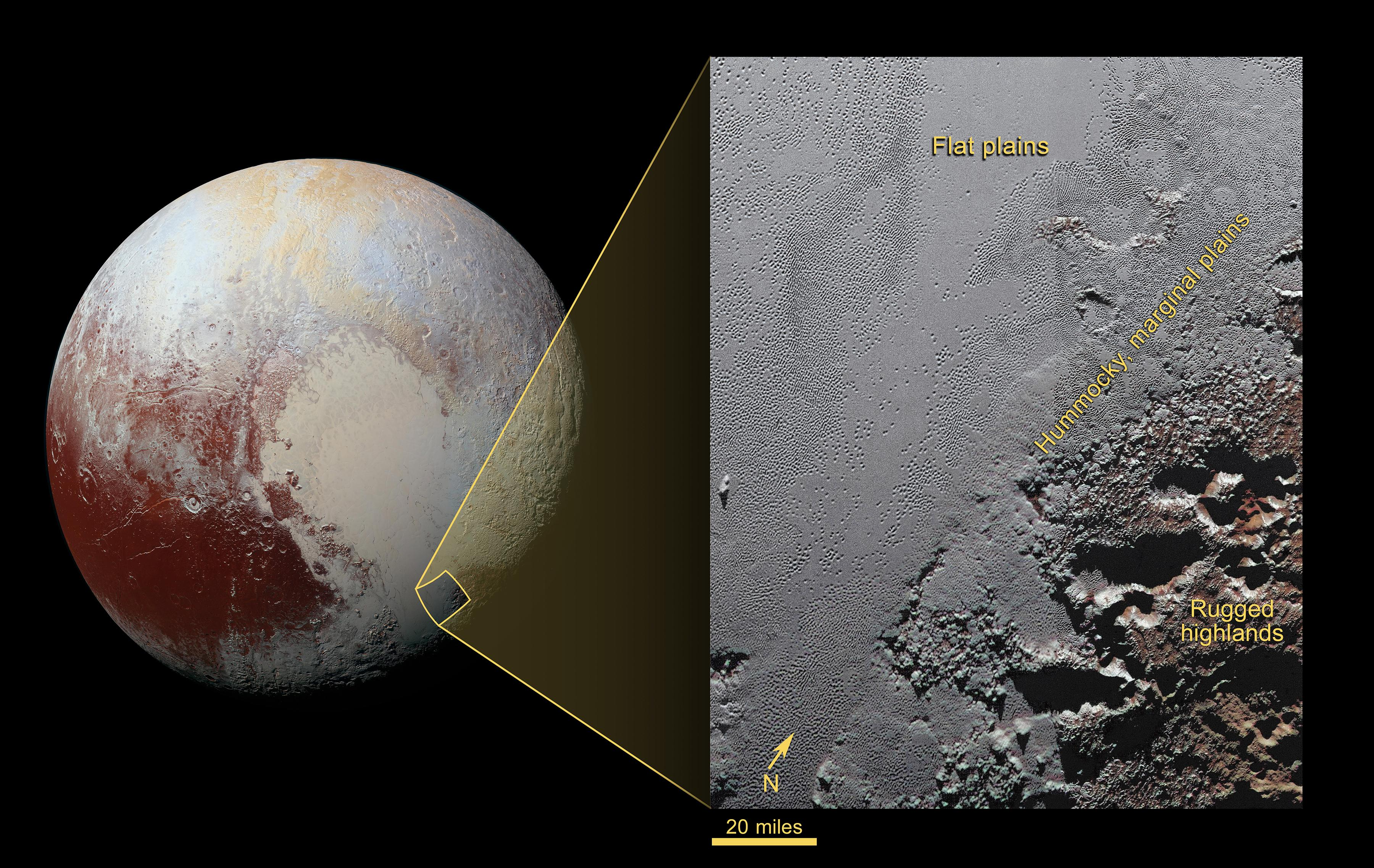
Safronov Regio - context

== In popular culture ==
Krun Macula is the name of the ship of the character Pluto in Heaven Will Be Mine, a 2018 visual novel.
