= Hun-Came Macula =

Equatorial dark region on Pluto

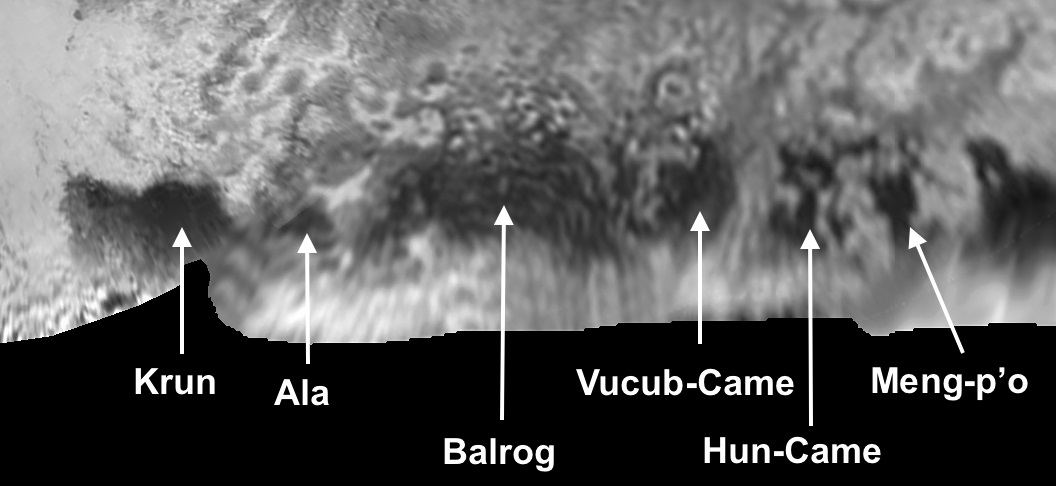
- The Brass Knuckles chain of equatorial dark regions on Pluto
- Location: Pluto
- Coordinates: 10°S 20°W
- Eponym: Jun Kameh

Hun-Came Macula is one of the "Brass Knuckles", a series of equatorial dark regions on Pluto. It is named after Jun Kameh [ˈχun kʰəˈmeh] "One Death", one of the Quiché death gods in the Popol Vuh.

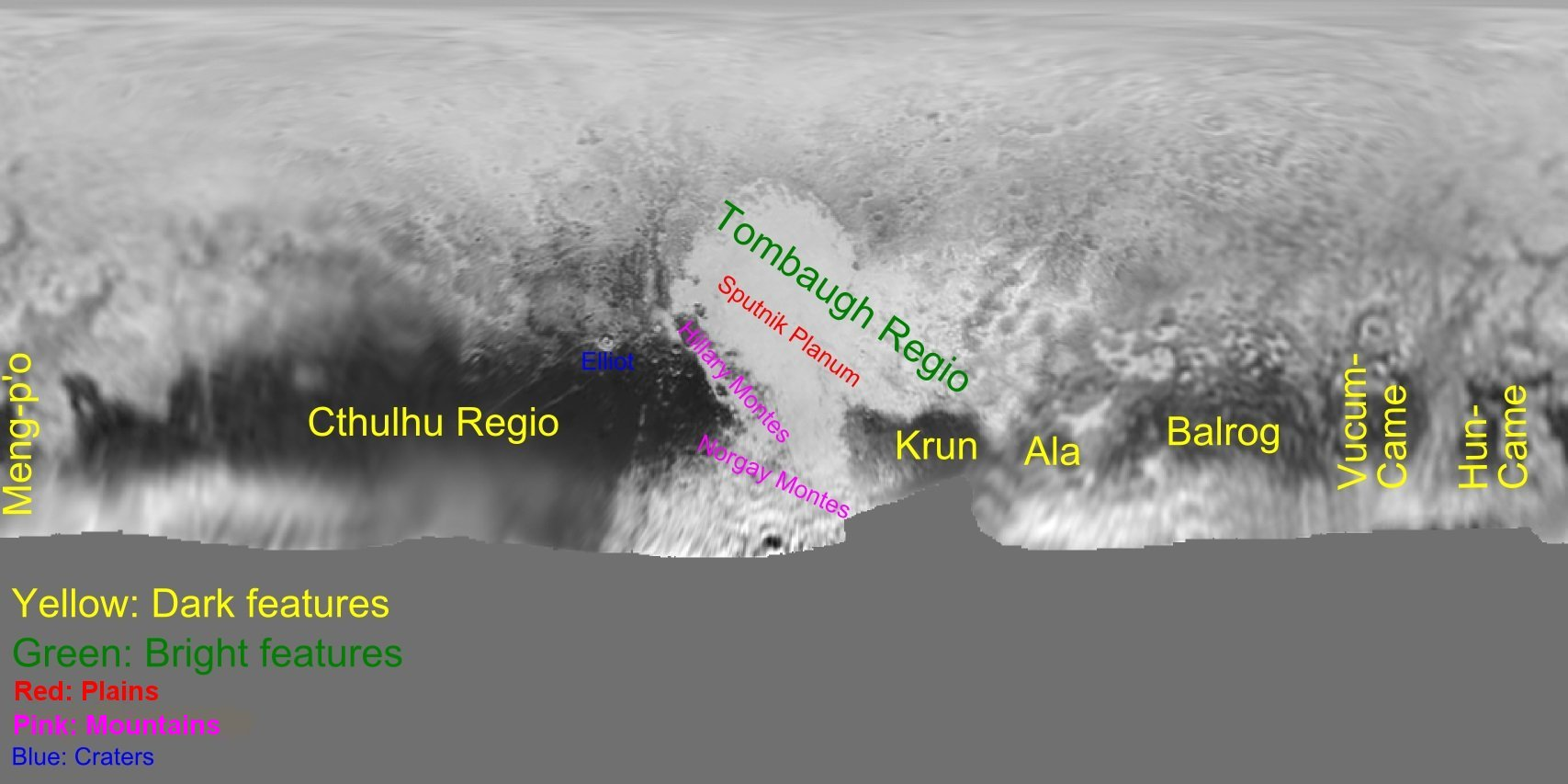
Cthulhu and the "Knuckles". Hun-Came is a small region at the far right, just east of Vucub-Came.
