= Balrog (disambiguation) =

A Balrog is a demon from J.R.R. Tolkien's Middle-earth legendarium.

Balrog may also refer to:

- Balrog (Street Fighter), a character in the Street Fighter video game series
- Vega (Street Fighter), the Street Fighter character named Balrog in the Japanese versions
- Balrog, a recurring boss in the video game Cave Story
- Balrog Award, awarded to science fiction works
- Balrog Botkyrka/Södertälje IK, a Swedish Floorball team outside Stockholm
- Harrington Regio (formerly Balrog Macula), the second-largest dark region on Pluto
- A character in Insaniquarium
- "The Balrog", a song by King Gizzard and the Lizard Wizard from the album Murder of the Universe, 2017

== See also ==
- Anthracosuchus balrogus, an extinct reptile named after Tolkien's Balrog
