= Vucub-Came Macula =

Equatorial dark region on Pluto

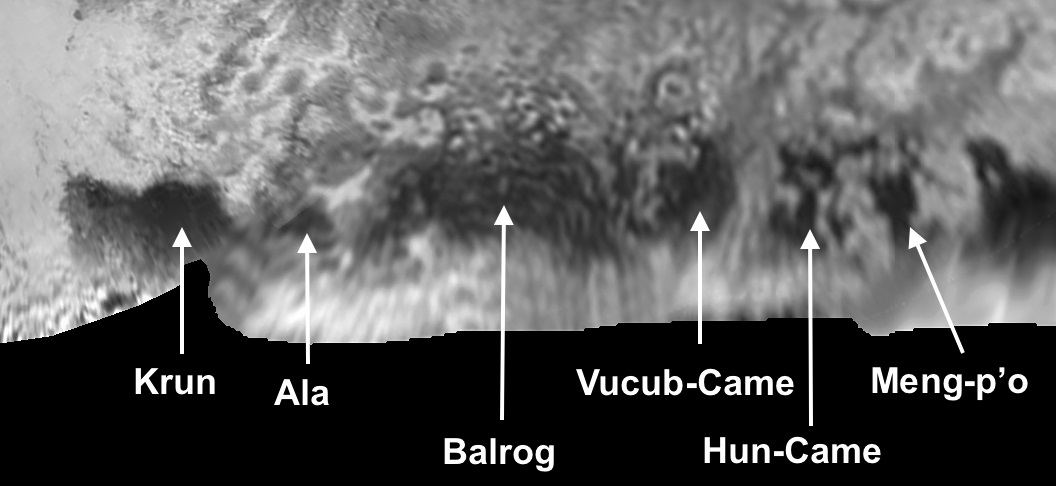
- The Brass Knuckles chain of equatorial dark regions on Pluto
- Feature type: Dark region
- Location: Pluto
- Coordinates: 10°S 40°W
- Discoverer: New Horizons
- Eponym: Wuquub' Kameh

Vucub-Came Macula is one of the "Brass Knuckles", a series of equatorial dark regions on Pluto. It is named after Wuquub' Kameh [ʋuˈqʰuːɓ̥ kʰəˈmeh] "Seven Death", one of the Quiché death gods in the Popol Vuh.

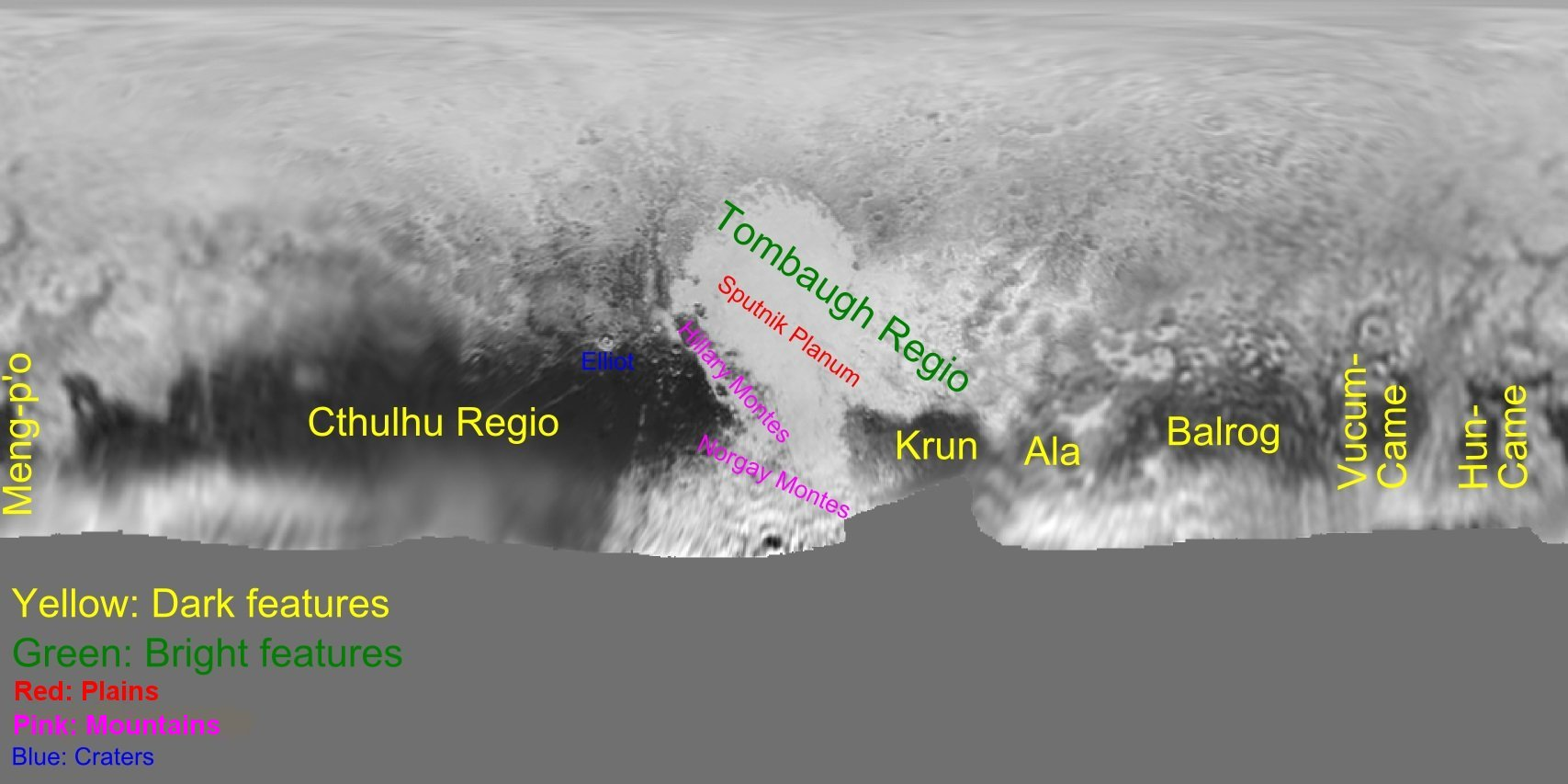
Cthulhu and the "Knuckles". Vucub-Came is a small region at the right, just west of Hun-Came.

Vucub-Came Macula is the fourth-largest dark spot on Pluto. Its surface is covered with tholins which give Vucub-Came its brown color. The dark spot is surrounded with tall uplands. Extensive fault systems in this area have formed deep canyons running roughly north–south.
