= Sharaf Regio =

Region of Pluto

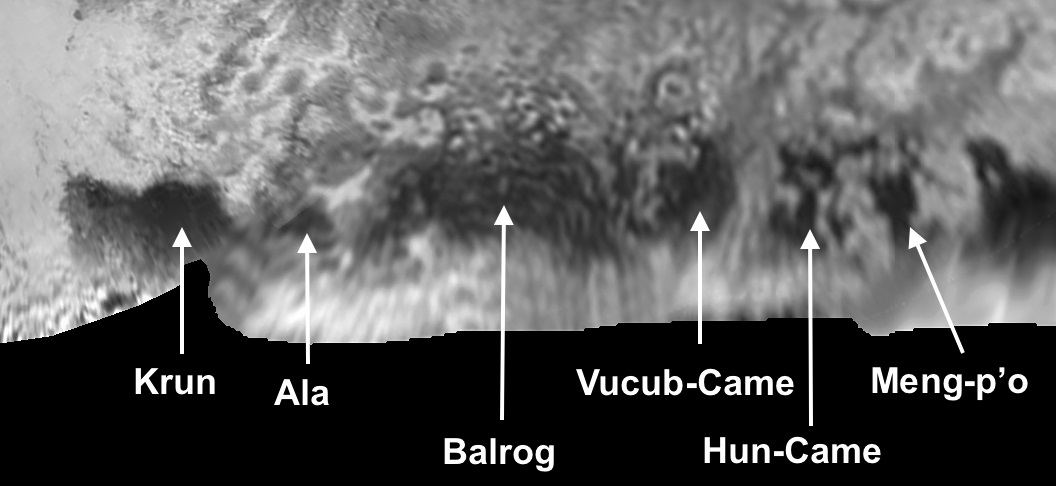
- The Brass Knuckles chain of equatorial dark regions on Pluto, with Sharaf Regio labeled as "Ala"
- Feature type: Regio
- Location: Pluto
- Coordinates: 11.38°S 238.67°E
- Eponym: Shafika Gil’mievna Sharaf

Sharaf Regio (formerly Ala Macula) is the smallest of the "Brass Knuckles", a series of equatorial dark regions on Pluto. It was initially informally named Ala Macula after Ala [àlà] "earth", the chthonic and most important deity of the Igbo people. The International Astronomical Union (IAU) officially approved the name Sharaf Regio after Shafika Gil’mievna Sharaf, a Soviet astronomer who developed an analytical theory for Pluto's motion.
