= Meng-pʽo Macula =

Equatorial dark region on Pluto

Meng-pʻo Macula
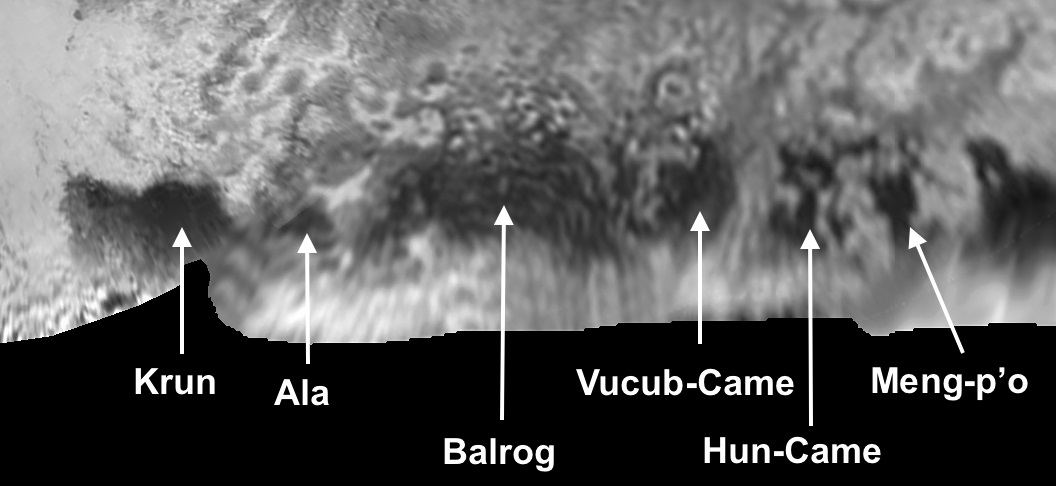
- The Brass Knuckles chain of equatorial dark regions on Pluto
- Location: Pluto
- Coordinates: 10°S 0°W
- Eponym: Meng Po

Meng-pʻo Macula is the easternmost of the "Brass Knuckles", a series of equatorial dark regions on Pluto. Meng-pʻo straddles the zero meridian, directly under Pluto's tidally locked moon Charon and just west of the tail of the "Whale", Belton Regio. It is named after Meng Po [mə̂ŋpʰwǒ], the Chinese underworld deity of forgetfulness.

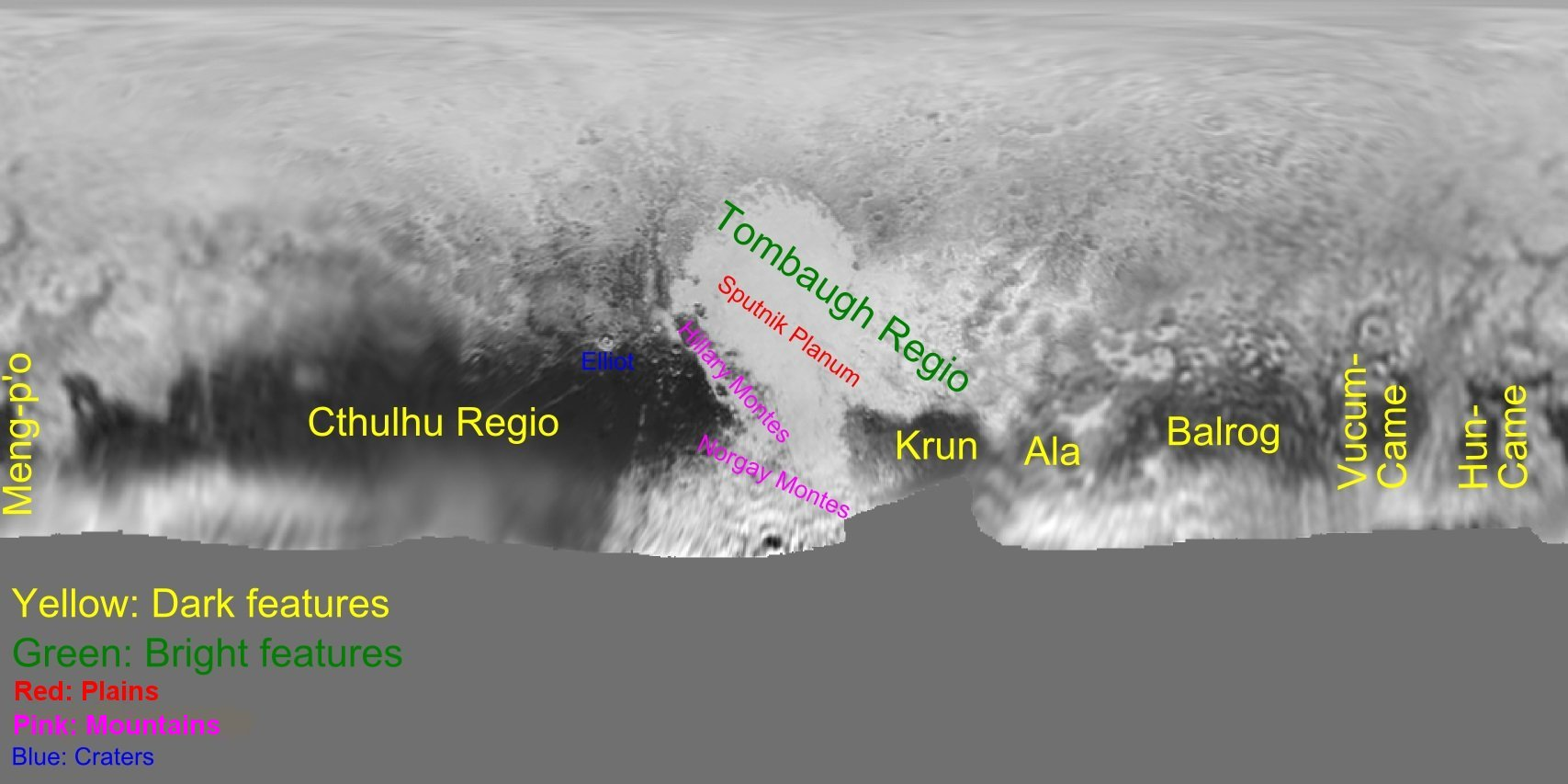
Cthulhu and Knuckles. Meng-pʻo is the small region split across the left and right edges of the map.
