= James W. Christy =

American astronomer (born 1938)

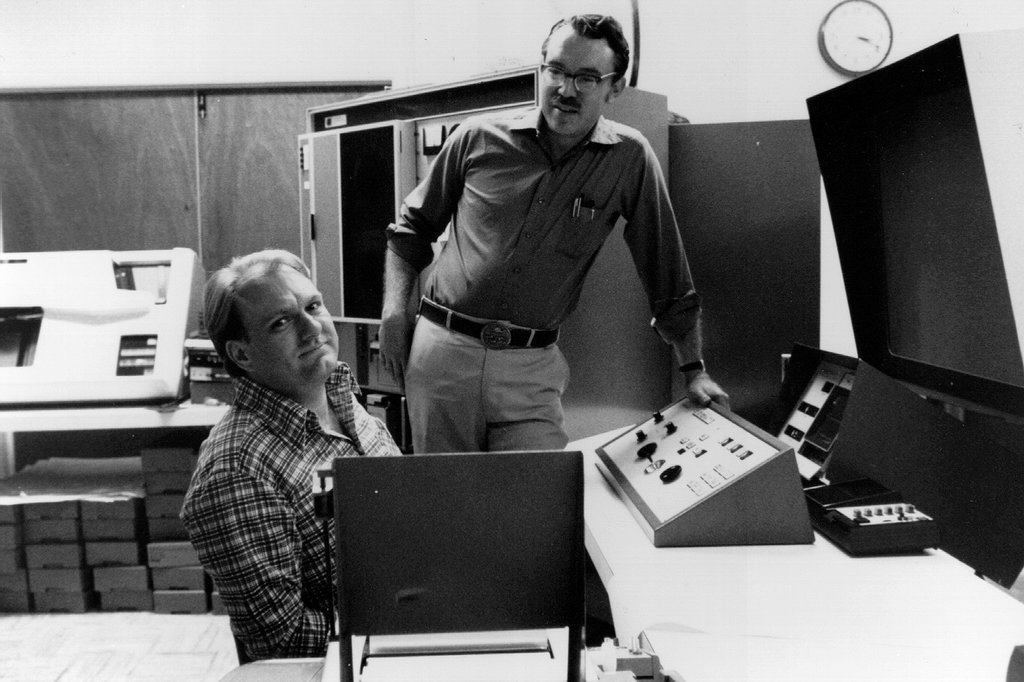
- James Christy (left) and Robert Harrington in 1978.
- Born: September 15, 1938 (age 88); Milwaukee, Wisconsin, U.S.
- Education: University of Arizona
- Scientific career
- Fields: Astronomy, astrometry
- Workplaces: United States Naval Observatory; Hughes Missile Systems

James Walter "Jim" Christy (born September 15, 1938) is an American astronomer known for discovering Charon, the largest moon of the dwarf planet Pluto.

== Early years ==
Christy was born in 1938 in Milwaukee, Wisconsin. He attended the University of Arizona and earned a Bachelor of Science degree in astronomy from there in 1965.

== Career ==
On June 22, 1978, while working at the United States Naval Observatory, he discovered that Pluto had a moon, which he named Charon shortly afterwards. The name remained unofficial until its adoption by the IAU in 1986.

The discovery was made by carefully examining an enlargement of a photographic plate of Pluto and noticing it had a very slight bulge on one side. This plate and others had been marked "poor" because the elongated image of Pluto was thought to be a defect resulting from improper alignment. The 1965 plates included a note "Pluto image elongated", but observatory astronomers, including Christy, assumed that the plates were defective until 1978.

However, Christy noticed that only Pluto was elongated—the background stars were not. His earlier work at the Naval Observatory had included photographing double stars, so it occurred to him that this bulge might be a companion of Pluto. After examining images from observatory archives dating back to 1965, he concluded that the bulge was indeed a moon.

The photographic evidence was considered convincing but not conclusive (it remained possible that the bulge was due to Pluto having an unexpectedly irregular shape). However, based on Charon's calculated orbit, a series of mutual eclipses of Pluto and Charon was predicted and observed, confirming the discovery.

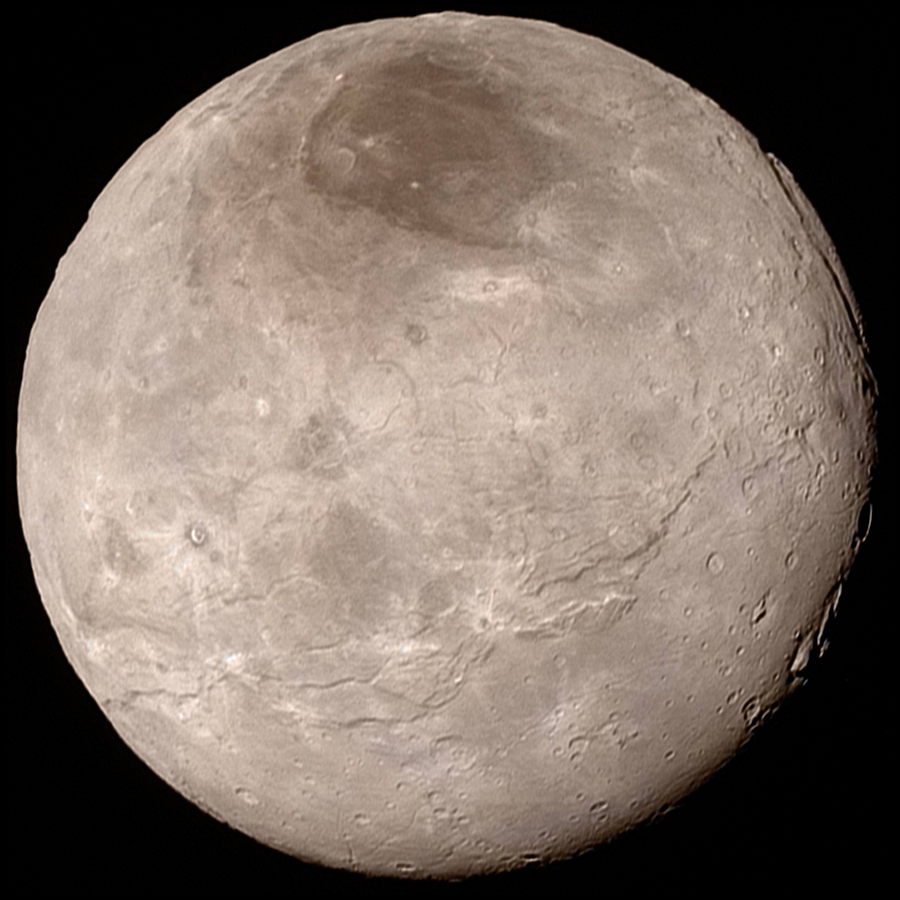
Charon, taken by New Horizons late on 13 July 2015. This color photograph made using Adobe Photoshop CS5.

In more modern telescopes, such as the Hubble Space Telescope or ground-based telescopes using adaptive optics, separate images of Pluto and Charon can be resolved, and the New Horizons probe took images showing some of Charon's surface features.

In late 2008, the asteroid 129564 Christy was named in his honor.† As of 2015, he resides in Flagstaff, Arizona. He has been married to Charlene Mary since 1975 and has four children. On July 14, 2015, he and Clyde Tombaugh's children were guests at the Johns Hopkins Applied Physics Laboratory when the New Horizons spacecraft successfully performed the first flyby of the Pluto-Charon system.

Christy's inspiration for the name "Charon" came about due to a personal interest in naming the moon after his wife. He used her nickname, "Char" for Charlene, and added -on (for his interest in physics in protons and electrons, which have -on endings) to make Charon. It was only later that he found the same name in mythology, that being the ferryman who carried souls across the Acheron River, one of the five mythical rivers that surrounded Pluto's underworld.
