= Harrington Regio =

Region of Pluto

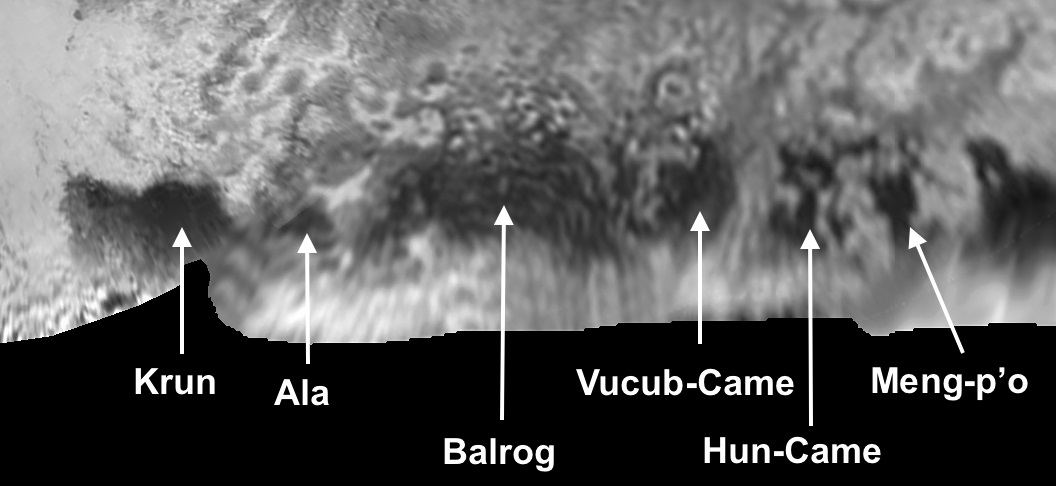
- The Brass Knuckles chain of equatorial dark regions on Pluto, with Harrington Regio labeled as "Balrog"
- Feature type: Regio
- Location: Pluto
- Coordinates: 6.58°N 309.63°E
- Eponym: Robert Sutton Harrington

Harrington Regio (formerly Balrog Macula) is the largest of the "Brass Knuckles", a series of equatorial dark regions on Pluto.

It is the largest dark equatorial feature on Pluto after the Belton Regio, and is located in the middle of the leading hemisphere.

It was initially informally named Balrog Macula after the balrogs, a race of demons in the fiction of J. R. R. Tolkien. However, the International Astronomical Union (IAU) instead officially approved the name Harrington Regio after Robert Sutton Harrington, an American astronomer who is considered to have co-discovered Charon.
