= Michael J. Belton =

American astronomer (1934–2018)

Michael J. S. Belton (September 29, 1934 – June 4, 2018) was President of Belton Space Exploration Initiatives and Emeritus Astronomer at the Kitt Peak National Observatory in Arizona. Belton served as the Chair of the 2002 Planetary Science Decadal Survey guiding NASA and other US Government Agencies plans for solar system exploration. Belton studied first at the University of St. Andrews in Scotland and earned his PhD at the University of California at Berkeley for his doctoral thesis on "The Interaction of Type II Comet Tails with the Interplanetary Medium".

Belton was born in Bognor Regis, England. He led the Galileo Imaging Science Team in high-resolution imaging studies of Venus, Jupiter, Jupiter's moons Io, Europa, Ganymede and Callisto, Earth's Moon as well as asteroids Ida, Gaspra, and Dactyl. The team also studied the collision of comet Shoemaker-Levy 9 with Jupiter.

== Honors ==
- Gerard P. Kuiper Prize in Planetary Science, 1995
- minor planet 3498 Belton has been named for him
- Plutonian feature Belton Regio has been named for him
