= Viktor Safronov =

Soviet astronomer (1917–1999)

Viktor Sergeevich Safronov (Russian: Ви́ктор Серге́евич Сафро́нов) (born Velikie Luki; 11 October 1917 in Russia – 18 September 1999 in Moscow, Russia) was a Soviet astronomer who put forward the low-mass-nebula model of planet formation, a consistent picture of how the planets formed from a disk of gas and dust around the Sun.

== Biography and legacy ==
Safronov graduated from Moscow State University Department of Mechanics and Mathematics in 1941. He defended a dissertation for the Doctor of Physical and Mathematical Sciences in 1968. His scientific interests covered planetary cosmogony, astrophysics and geophysics.

His planetesimal hypothesis of planet formation is still widely accepted among astronomers, although alternative theories exist (such as the gravitational fragmentation of the protoplanetary disk directly into planets).

A minor planet, 3615 Safronov, discovered by US-American astronomer Edward L. G. Bowell in 1983, is named after him, as is Safronov Regio on Pluto.

== Awards ==
- Otto Schmidt USSR Academy of Sciences Prize (1974)
- Leonard Medal Meteoritical Society (1989)
- Kuiper Prize in Planetary Science (1990)

== Selected publications ==
- Evolution of the Protoplanetary Cloud and Formation of the Earth and the Planets. Moscow: Nauka Press, 1969. Trans. NASA TTF 677, 1972.

== See also ==
- Accretion (astrophysics)
- George Wetherill
