= Robert Sutton Harrington =

American astronomer (1942–1993)

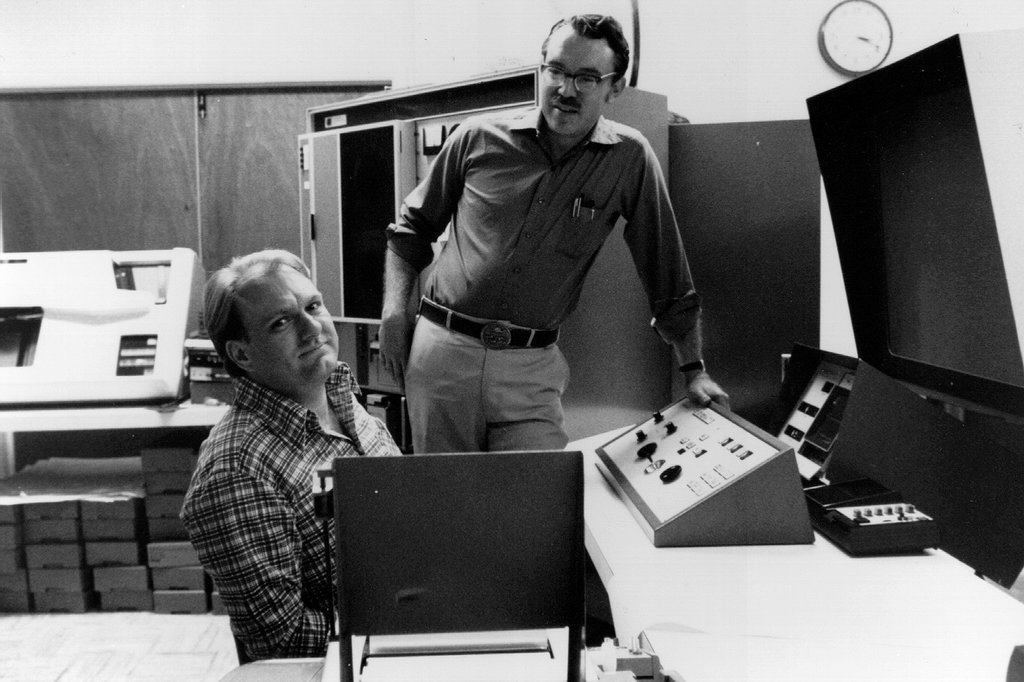
Robert Harrington (right) with James W. Christy in 1978

Robert Sutton Harrington (October 21, 1942 – January 23, 1993) was an American astronomer who worked at the United States Naval Observatory (USNO). Harrington was born near Newport News, Virginia. His father was an archaeologist. He was married to Betty-Jean Maycock in 1976, with two daughters, Amy and Ann.

Harrington worked at the USNO. Another astronomer there, James W. Christy, consulted with him after discovering bulges in the images of Pluto, which turned out to be Pluto's satellite Charon. For this reason, some consider Harrington to be a co-discoverer of Charon, although Christy usually gets sole credit. By the laws of physics, it is easy to determine the mass of a binary system based on its orbital period, so Harrington was the first to calculate the mass of the Pluto-Charon system, which was lower than even the lowest previous estimates of Pluto's mass.

For much of his career, he proposed the existence of a Planet X beyond Pluto and supported searches for it, collaborating initially with T. C. (Tom) Van Flandern.

Harrington died of esophageal cancer in 1993. The asteroid 3216 Harrington was named in his honour.

== Disproof of existence of Planet X ==
Six months before Harrington's death, E. Myles Standish had used data from Voyager 2's 1989 flyby of Neptune, which had revised the planet's total mass downward by 0.5%—an amount comparable to the mass of Mars—to recalculate its gravitational effect on Uranus. When Neptune's newly determined mass was used in the Jet Propulsion Laboratory Developmental Ephemeris (JPL DE), the supposed discrepancies in the Uranian orbit, and with them the need for a Planet X, vanished. There are no discrepancies in the trajectories of any space probes such as Pioneer 10, Pioneer 11, Voyager 1, and Voyager 2 that can be attributed to the gravitational pull of a large undiscovered object in the outer Solar System. Although most astronomers agree that Planet X, as Lowell defined it, does not exist, as of 2025 there is speculation concerning Planet Nine, a distinct hypothetical planet in the outer Solar System. Although the evidence and orbital properties of Planet Nine are very different from those of Harrington's Planet X, the mass estimates are similar: Planet Nine is approximately 4.4 Earth masses while Harrington's Planet X was estimated to be 4 Earth masses.

== See also ==
- Planets beyond Neptune
