= List of geological features on Pluto =

A map of Pluto showing the names officially approved by the IAU as of 12 February 2025, along with many informal names in bold and italics.

This is a list of named geological features on Pluto, identified by scientists working with data from the New Horizons spacecraft. The International Astronomical Union (IAU) officially approved the first 14 names on 8 August 2017 (announced 7 September 2017), with additional names following in each subsequent year, but many of the names listed on this page are still informal. The IAU has determined that names will be chosen from the following themes:

- Names for the underworld from the world's mythologies
- Gods, goddesses, and dwarfs associated with the underworld
- Heroes and other explorers of the underworld
- Writers associated with Pluto and the Kuiper belt
- Pioneering space missions and spacecraft
- Scientists and engineers associated with Pluto and the Kuiper belt

== Cavi ==
A cavus is a hollow or steep-sided depression. Plutonian cavi are named after underworlds from fiction and mythology. The following is a list of official and unofficial names chosen by the New Horizons team. Names that have been officially approved are labeled as such.

Feature	Named after	Approval
Adlivun Cavus	Underworld in Inuit mythology	8 Aug 2017 · WGPSN
Baralku Cavi	Baralku, the island of the dead in Yolngu culture	—
Hekla Cavus	An Icelandic volcano believed to be the entrance to Hell in medieval European times	30 May 2018 · WGPSN

== Colles ==
A collis is a low hill. Plutonian colles are named after spacecraft that operated in Earth orbit. The following is a list of official and unofficial names chosen by the New Horizons team. Names that have been officially approved are labeled as such.

Feature	Named after	Approval
Astrid Colles	The Astrid program, Sweden's first satellites, in turn named after Astrid Lindgren	—
Challenger Colles	Honors the loss of the Space Shuttle Challenger	7 May 2022 · WGPSN
Coleta de Dados Colles	Satélite de Coleta de Dados, first Brazilian satellite	—
Columbia Colles	Honors the loss of the Space Shuttle Columbia	7 May 2022 · WGPSN
Soyuz Colles	The Soyuz program; honors the loss of Soyuz 11	—

== Craters ==
Plutonian craters are named after scientists and other people associated with the study of Pluto. The following is a list of official and unofficial names chosen by the New Horizons team. Names that have been officially approved are labeled as such.

Feature	Named after	Approval
Bower	Ernest Clare Bower, American astronomer who calculated one of the first orbits of Pluto	11 Sep 2024 · WGPSN
Brinton	Henry Brinton, NASA administrator instrumental in Pluto studies	—
Burney	Venetia Burney, who proposed the name of Pluto	8 Aug 2017 · WGPSN
Coradini	Angioletta Coradini, Italian planetary scientist	27 May 2022 · WGPSN
Coughlin	Thomas Boyd Coughlin, American mechanical and space engineer, first project manager of the New Horizons mission	3 Jan 2020 · WGPSN
Edgeworth	Kenneth Edgeworth, Irish astronomer who posited the Kuiper Belt	3 Feb 2021 · WGPSN
Elliot	James L. Elliot, discoverer of Pluto's atmosphere	8 Aug 2017 · WGPSN
Farinella	Paolo Farinella, Italian astronomer	11 Sep 2024 · WGPSN
Gibson	William C. Gibson, Original Science Payload Manager for the New Horizons mission	8 Jan 2025 · WGPSN
Giclas	Henry L. Giclas, an astronomer at Lowell Observatory	8 Jan 2025 · WGPSN
Guest	John Guest, British volcanologist and planetary scientist	—
H. Smith	Harlan Smith, astronomer and director of McDonald Observatory	—
Hardaway	Lisa Hardaway, American aerospace engineer and program manager for the RALPH telescope on New Horizons	5 Aug 2020 · WGPSN
Hardie	Robert H. Hardie, American astronomer, co-discoverer of Pluto's 6.4-day rotation period	3 Jan 2020 · WGPSN
Hollis	Andrew Hollis, British astronomer	—
Isakowitz	Matthew Isakowitz, Aerospace engineer who significantly contributed to commercial spaceflight, and was an intern working for the New Horizons mission	—
Khare	Bishun Khare, Indian-American chemist specialized in planetary atmospheres, studied tholins extensively	30 May 2019 · WGPSN
Kiladze	Rolan Kiladze, Georgian astronomer who investigated the dynamics, astrometry, and photometry of Pluto	30 May 2019 · WGPSN
Kowal	Charles T. Kowal, American astronomer who discovered the first centaur	7 May 2020 · WGPSN
Oort	Jan Oort, Dutch astronomer who posited the Oort Cloud	3 Feb 2021 · WGPSN
Owen	Tobias Owen, whose pioneering work on the origin and composition of planetary atmospheres and comets was revolutionary, along with playing a critical role in several NASA and ESA missions, such as Viking, Voyager, Galileo, Rosetta, Cassini-Huygens, and Juno. Owen was also the chairperson of the Task Group for Outer Solar System Nomenclature.	—
Pulfrich	Carl Pulfrich, German physicist who developed the blink-comparator used to discover Pluto	5 Aug 2020 · WGPSN
Simonelli	Damon Simonelli, American astronomer and Pluto geologist	30 May 2019 · WGPSN
Zagar	Damon Francesco, Italian astronomer who carried out early studies of the orbit of Pluto	5 Aug 2020 · WGPSN

== Dorsa ==
A dorsum is a ridge. Plutonian dorsa are named after underworlds in mythology. The following is a list of official and unofficial names chosen by the New Horizons team. Names that have been officially approved are labeled as such.

Feature	Named after	Approval
Pandemonium Dorsa	Pandæmonium, the capital of Hell in the poems of John Milton	—
Tartarus Dorsa	Tartarus, the pit of hell in Greek mythology	8 Aug 2017 · WGPSN

== Faculae ==
A facula is a bright spot on the surface of a planet. Plutonian faculae are named after underworld creatures from mythology. The following is a list of official and unofficial names chosen by the New Horizons team. Names that have been officially approved are labeled as such.

Feature	Named after	Approval
Supay Facula	Supay, spirit who lived in the underworld in Quechua, Aymara, and Incan mythologies	—

== Fluctūs ==
A fluctus is a terrain covered by outflow of liquid. Plutonian fluctūs are named after travellers to the underworld. The following is a list of official and unofficial names chosen by the New Horizons team. Names that have been officially approved are labeled as such.

Feature	Named after	Approval
Dionysus Fluctus	The god Dionysus from Greek mythology, who travels to Hades (the underworld) to bring the playwright Euripides back	—
Mpobe Fluctus	Mpobe from Baganda mythology, a hero who willingly enters the underground world	—
Pere Porter Fluctus	Pere Porter is the character of a 16th-17th century moral novel who travels to hell	—
Xanthias Fluctus	Xanthias from Greek mythology, the slave who joins Dionysus on his travel to the underworld	—

== Fossae ==
A fossa is a ditch-like feature. Plutonian fossae are named after figures associated with underworld myths. The following is a list of official and unofficial names chosen by the New Horizons team. Names that have been officially approved are labeled as such.

Feature	Named after	Approval
Beatrice Fossa	Beatrice, visits hell and asks Virgil to guide Dante in Dante's Inferno	3 Feb 2021 · WGPSN
Djanggawul Fossae	Djanggawul, Yolngu creation figures from the Island of the Dead	8 Aug 2017 · WGPSN
Dumuzi Fossa	Dumuzi, Sumerian fertility god who replaced his wife Inanna in the underworld	3 Feb 2021 · WGPSN
Hermod Fossae	Hermod, son of Odin, who rode the horse Sleipnir into the underworld to retrieve his brother Balder	25 Sep 2019 · WGPSN
Inanna Fossa	Inanna, Sumerian goddess who descended to the underworld	3 Feb 2021 · WGPSN
Kaknú Fossa	Kaknú, legendary Ohlone hero who travelled to the underworld to battle Wiwe. He resembled a peregrine falcon.	12 Aug 2019 · WGPSN
Mwindo Fossae	Mwindo, legendary Nyanga hero who travelled to the underworld	30 May 2019 · WGPSN
Sleipnir Fossa	Sleipnir, the steed Odin rides to the underworld	8 Aug 2017 · WGPSN
Sun Wukong Fossa	Sun Wukong, the Chinese Monkey King who went to Hell	—
Uncama Fossa	Uncama, Zulu tale hero who followed a porcupine underground and came upon the village of dead souls	3 Jan 2020 · WGPSN
Virgil Fossae	Virgil, Dante's guide through Hell and Purgatory in The Divine Comedy	8 Aug 2017 · WGPSN

== Labyrinthi ==
A labyrinthus is a complex of intersecting valleys or ridges. Plutonian labyrinthi are named after gods of the underworld. The following is a list of names chosen by the New Horizons team. Names that have been officially approved are labeled as such.

Feature	Named after	Approval
Xolotl Labyrinthus	Xolotl, god of fire, lightning, and death in Aztec mythology	—

== Lacūs ==
A lacus is a small plain, derived from the word lake. The following is a list of names chosen by the New Horizons team. Names that have been officially approved are labeled as such.

Feature	Named after	Approval
Alcyonia Lacus	Lerna, also known as the Alcyonian Lake, was an entry to the netherworld in Greek mythology.	30 May 2019 · WGPSN

== Lineae ==
A linea is an elongated marking. Plutonian lineae are named after space probes. The following is a list of names chosen by the New Horizons team. Names that have been officially approved are labeled as such.

Feature	Named after	Approval
Chandrayaan Linea	Chandrayaan program, a series of Indian lunar probes (2008-present)	11 Apr 2023 · WGPSN
Hiten Linea	Hiten, the first Japanese lunar probe (1990)	11 Apr 2023 · WGPSN
Luna Linea	Luna program, a series of Soviet lunar probes (1959–1976), including the first man-made object to reach the Moon	11 Apr 2023 · WGPSN
Surveyor Linea	Surveyor program, a series of U.S. lunar probes (1966–1968)	11 Apr 2023 · WGPSN
Yutu Linea	Yutu, a series of Chinese lunar rovers (2013-present)	25 Apr 2023 · WGPSN
Zond Linea	Zond program, a series of Soviet space probes (1964–1970)	11 Apr 2023 · WGPSN

== Maculae ==
A macula is a dark spot. Plutonian maculae are named after underworld creatures from fiction and mythology. The following is a list of names chosen by the New Horizons team. Names that have been officially approved are labeled as such.

Feature	Named after	Approval
Cadejo Macula	Cadejo, from Central American folklore	—
Hun-Came Macula	One of the two leading Maya death gods from the Popol Vuh	—
Meng-pʻo Macula	Meng Po, the Chinese goddess of forgetfulness after death	—
Morgoth Macula	Morgoth, a figure of evil in the writings of J.R.R. Tolkien	—
Vucub-Came Macula	One of the two leading Maya death gods from the Popol Vuh	—

== Montes ==
A mons is a mountain. Plutonian montes (mountain ranges) are named after explorers and adventurers. The following is a list of names chosen by the New Horizons team. Names that have been officially approved are labeled as such.

Feature	Named after	Approval
Al-Idrisi Montes	Muhammad al-Idrisi, medieval Almoravid explorer	8 Aug 2017 · WGPSN
Baret Montes	Jeanne Baret, first woman to have completed circumnavigation voyage of the globe	26 Apr 2018 · WGPSN
Coleman Mons	Bessie Coleman, American aviator, first African-American woman and first Native American to hold a pilot license	2 Sep 2019 · WGPSN
Elcano Montes	Juan Sebastián Elcano, completed Magellan's circumnavigation after his death	30 May 2019 · WGPSN
Hillary Montes	Edmund Hillary, first to scale Mount Everest (with Tenzing Norgay)	8 Aug 2017 · WGPSN
Piccard Mons	Auguste Piccard, conducted measurements of the upper atmosphere using balloons to reach an altitude of 23 kilometers	30 May 2019 · WGPSN
Pigafetta Montes	Antonio Pigafetta, participated in Magellan's circumnavigation and wrote its only first-hand record	30 May 2019 · WGPSN
Tabei Montes	Junko Tabei, first woman to climb both Mount Everest and the Seven Summits	19 Nov 2019 · WGPSN
Tenzing Montes	Tenzing Norgay, first to scale Mount Everest (with Edmund Hillary)	8 Aug 2017 · WGPSN
Wright Mons	Wilbur and Orville Wright, built and flew the first successful airplane	30 May 2019 · WGPSN
Zheng He Montes	Zheng He, medieval Chinese explorer	3 Feb 2021 · WGPSN

== Paludes ==
A palus (literally swamp) is a small plain. Paludes on Pluto are named after historic explorers. The following is a list of names chosen by the New Horizons team. Names that have been officially approved are labeled as such.

Feature	Named after	Approval
David-Néel Palus	Alexandra David-Néel, Belgian–French explorer, best known for her 1924 visit to Lhasa, Tibet	—
Hyecho Palus	Hyecho, Korean traveler and scholar, crossed Asia from China to Arabia and back in 724-727	3 Jan 2020 · WGPSN
Tinné Paludes	Alexine Tinne, Dutch explorer in Africa, the first European woman to attempt to cross the Sahara	—

== Plana ==
A planum is a plateau or high plain. One was initially identified (Sputnik Planum), but it has since been reclassified as a planitia.

== Planitiae ==
A planitia is a low plain, distinct from plana as they are located on lower terrain. The following is a list of names chosen by the New Horizons team. Names that have been officially approved are labeled as such.

Feature	Named after	Approval
Lunokhod Planitia	The Lunokhod program, two Soviet lunar rovers	3 Feb 2021 · WGPSN
Ranger Planitia	The Ranger program, a series of unmanned probes sent to the moon in the 1960s	3 Feb 2021 · WGPSN
Rosetta Planitia	The Rosetta mission, the first mission to orbit and land a spacecraft on a comet.	7 May 2022 · WGPSN
Sputnik Planitia	Sputnik 1, the first satellite to orbit the Earth	8 Aug 2017 · WGPSN

== Regiones ==
A regio is a region geographically distinct from its surroundings. Plutonian regiones are named after underworld spirits in fiction and mythology, or after scientists associated with the study of Pluto. The following is a list of names chosen by the New Horizons team. Names that have been officially approved are labeled as such. Belton, Harrington, Safronov, and Sharaf regiones were all formerly maculae, informally named Cthulhu, Balrog, Krun, and Ala, respectively.

Feature	Named after	Approval
Belton Regio	Michael J. S. Belton, British astronomer	22 Sep 2023 · WGPSN
Harrington Regio	Robert Sutton Harrington, American astronomer, the co-discoverer of Charon and first person to calculate the Pluto system's mass	11 Sep 2024 · WGPSN
Lowell Regio	Percival Lowell, whose ideas about Planet X inadvertently led to Pluto's discovery	30 May 2019 · WGPSN
Safronov Regio	Viktor Safronov, Russian astronomer	22 Sep 2023 · WGPSN
Sharaf Regio	Shafika Gil'mievna Sharaf, Soviet astronomer	11 Sep 2024 · WGPSN
Tombaugh Regio	Clyde Tombaugh, discoverer of Pluto	8 Aug 2017 · WGPSN

== Rupēs ==
A rupes is an escarpment. Plutonian rupēs are named after explorers. The following is a list of names chosen by the New Horizons team. Names that have been officially approved are labeled as such.

Feature	Named after	Approval
Cousteau Rupes	Jacques Cousteau, undersea explorer	—
Eriksson Rupes	Leif Erikson, first Norse explorer of America	—
Piri Rupes	Piri Reis, creator of one of the earliest world maps	30 May 2019 · WGPSN
Ride Rupes	Sally Ride, American astronaut and physicist, first American woman in space	2 Sep 2021 · WGPSN

== Terrae ==
A terra is an extensive landmass. Plutonian terrae are named after space probes. The following is a list of names chosen by the New Horizons team. Names that have been officially approved are labeled as such.

Feature	Named after	Approval
Hayabusa Terra	Hayabusa, the first spacecraft to return a sample of an asteroid	8 Aug 2017 · WGPSN
Pioneer Terra	The Pioneer program, which included the first probes to Jupiter and Saturn	3 Feb 2021 · WGPSN
Vega Terra	The Vega program, which dropped probes onto Venus's surface along with the first close flybys to Comet Halley	30 May 2019 · WGPSN
Venera Terra	The Venera program, first landers on Venus	30 May 2019 · WGPSN
Viking Terra	The Viking program, two Mars orbiters and landers	3 Feb 2021 · WGPSN
Voyager Terra	The Voyager program, the first probes to visit Uranus, Neptune and interstellar space	8 Aug 2017 · WGPSN

== Valles ==
A vallis is a valley. Plutonian valles are named after historic explorers. The following is a list of names chosen by the New Horizons team. Names that have been officially approved are labeled as such.

Feature	Named after	Approval
Heyerdahl Vallis	Thor Heyerdahl, Norwegian adventurer and ethnographer	—
Hunahpu Valles	Hunahpu, one of the mythological Maya Hero Twins	30 May 2019 · WGPSN
Ivanov Vallis	Lyubomir Ivanov, Bulgarian scientist and Antarctic explorer	—
Kupe Vallis	Kupe, legendary discoverer of New Zealand	—
Lemminkäinen Valles	Lemminkäinen, a hero of the Finnish national epic the Kalevala, traveled to the underworld	7 May 2022 · WGPSN
Väinämöinen Valles	Väinämöinen, central character of the Finnish national epic the Kalevala, traveled to the underworld	7 May 2022 · WGPSN

== See also ==
- Geography of Pluto
- Geology of Pluto
- List of geological features on Charon
