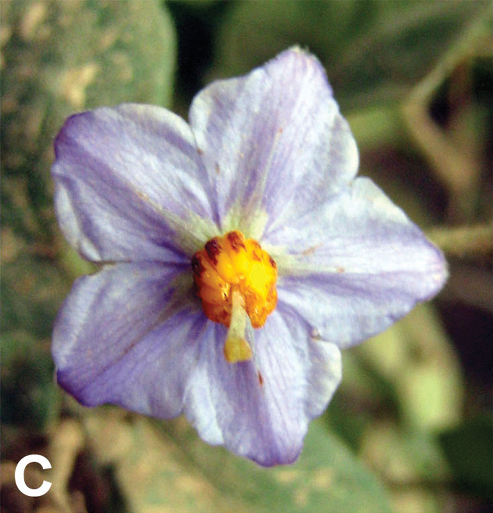

Conservation status
- Least Concern (IUCN 3.1)

Scientific classification
- Kingdom: Plantae
- Clade: Embryophytes
- Clade: Tracheophytes
- Clade: Spermatophytes
- Clade: Angiosperms
- Clade: Eudicots
- Clade: Asterids
- Order: Solanales
- Family: Solanaceae
- Genus: Solanum
- Species: S. baretiae

Binomial name
- Solanum baretiae Tepe

= Solanum baretiae =

Species of flowering plant

Solanum baretiae is a species of flowering plant in the genus Solanum, a member of the nightshade family that includes the potato and the tomato. It belongs to the section Anarrhichomenum and has similarities to Solanum chimborazense. The plant is found in the Andes in southern Ecuador and northwestern Peru. It was described by American botanist Eric J. Tepe in 2012 and named after Jeanne Baret, a French botanist who was the first woman to circumnavigate the world, disguised as a man and as assistant of Philibert Commerson. The plant occurs in a variety of habitats; its conservation status is classified as least concern.

== Description ==
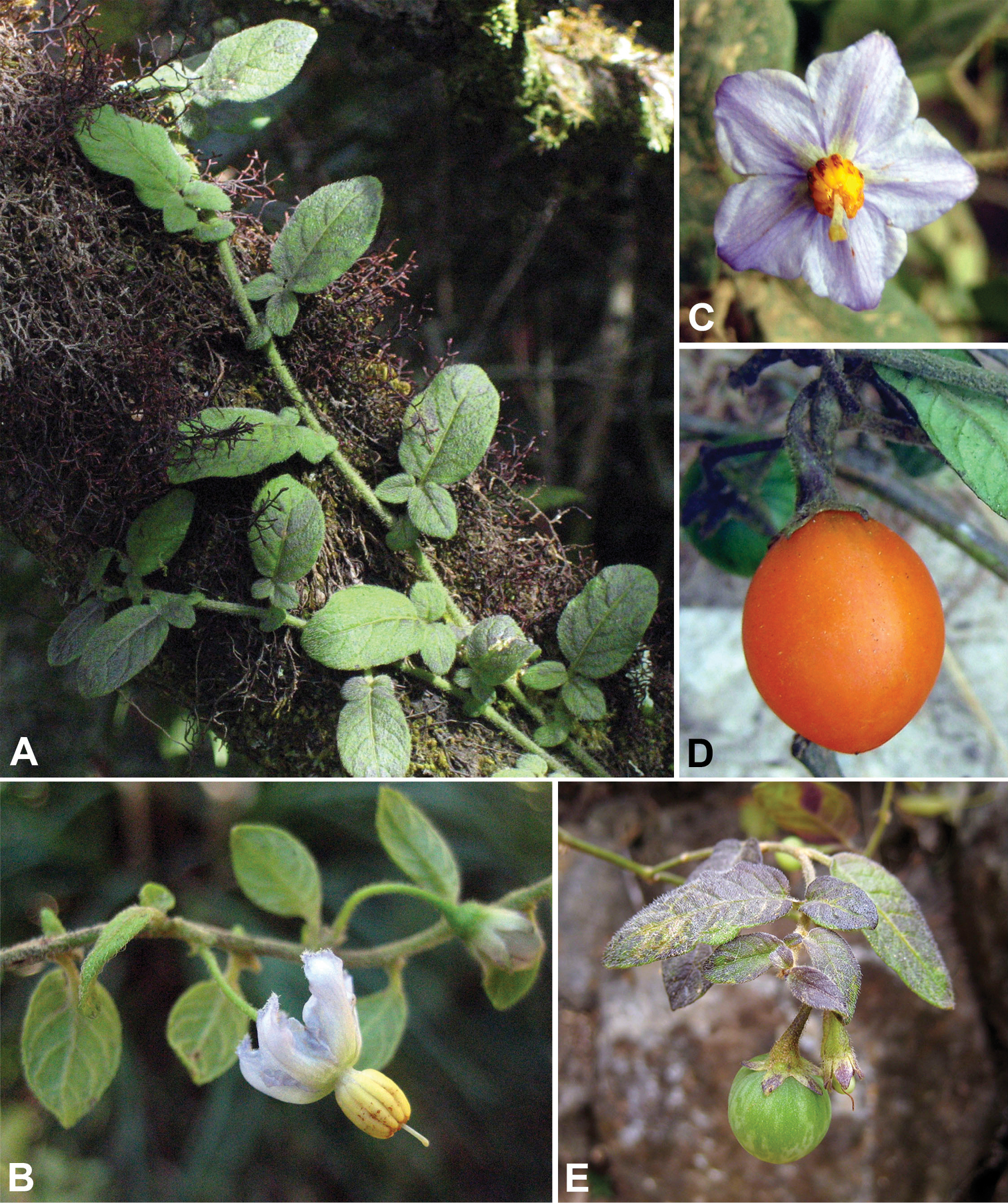
Solanum baretiae. A: Habit. B: Flower with reflexed corolla and bud. C: Flower with flat corolla. D: Mature fruit. E: Immature fruit.

Solanum baretiae is a species of Solanum that is similar to Solanum chimborazense, but has more and larger flowers and different patterns of pubescence. Solanum baretiae is a vine that can grow along the ground or on other plants, reaching up to 3 metres (9.8 ft). It usually has leaves that are 3-pinnate to 5-pinnate, but they can be between simple and 7-pinnate. The number of possible leaflet counts is unusually high; the only other species in the Anarrhichomenum section with the same variability is Solanum sodiroi. Its flowers grow in small clusters of one to eight (more on the main stems, up to three on the shoots) and have both male and female structures. The petals are arranged as a pentagonal corolla of 0.8 to 1.5 cm (0.31 to 0.59 in) diameter, in shades of violet to white with some yellow. The fruit is ellipsoidal, about 2 to 2.5 cm (0.79 to 0.98 in) long and 1.5 to 2 cm (0.59 to 0.79 in) wide, and green when immature, turning to orange. The seeds are fairly flat with a round or teardrop-like shape and a length of 3 to 4.2 mm (0.12 to 0.17 in), coloured light to medium brown with smooth surfaces and radial lines on the wing.

From the collected specimens, the plant is known to have flowers between June and August as well as in October. Observations of fruits have been in May and in June.

== Taxonomy and etymology ==
The plant was named by Eric J. Tepe, a botanist from the University of Utah and University of Cincinnati. He described it in a 2012 publication called "A new species of Solanum named for Jeanne Baret, an overlooked contributor to the history of botany", jointly with Lynn Bohs from the University of Utah, an expert on Solanum, and with Glynis Ridley, author of the biography The Discovery of Jeanne Baret. It is placed in the Anarrhichomenum section of Solanum, a genus that has an estimated 1,500 species and contains plants of very high agricultural importance like the tomato, the potato and the eggplant. The plant differs from Solanum chimborazense, which has smaller corollas and fewer flowers, but some of its specimens were until 2012 identified as belonging to that species. The type specimen was collected in 1992 in Peru.

Tepe discovered the species by studying herbarium specimens while attempting a revision of the Anarrhichomenum section. By 2010, he had found specimens in the wild in Peru, but did not yet have a name for the new species. After hearing an interview with Ridley on the radio, he came up with naming a species after Jeanne Baret, the first woman to circumnavigate the world.

Jeanne Baret (also written Barret or Baré) was a French woman who was the housekeeper, lover and assistant of the botanist Philibert Commerson. When Commerson accompanied Louis Antoine de Bougainville on his voyage round the world in 1766, Baret joined him, disguised as a man. The presence of women on ships of the French navy was against the custom of the time and prohibited by the regulations. Baret had received training in botany probably from Commerson and possibly also from Bernard de Jussieu's public lectures in the Jardin du Roi. During the voyage, Baret assisted Commerson in collecting over 6,000 specimens of plants; as Commerson was often in ill health, she may have collected many of these on her own. Other estimates go up to 30,000 specimens including 5,000 new species. Many species are named after Commerson, who himself intended to name a genus of plants Baretia after his assistant; however, this was never published and these plants now belong to Turraea; when Commerson's specimens arrived in Paris the genus had already been named. In his intended dedication, Commerson noted Baret as a "valiant young woman" and thanked her for "so many plants never gathered before, for so many herbaria constituted with care, for so many collections of insect and shells". In view of Baret's disguise, Commerson thought a plant with highly variable morphology was an especially apt choice to be named after her.

Tepe and collaborators dedicated Solanum baretiae to her, following Commerson by stating "we believe that this new species of Solanum, with its highly variable leaves, is a fitting tribute to Baret". This made it the second species officially named after Baret, after Polyscias baretiana Bernardi (1974) from Madagascar. In 2023, Martín E. Timaná named the Baretia genus in her honour, which as of 2025 is listed as a synonym of Stellaria by World Flora Online.

== Distribution and habitat ==
The plant occurs in the Andes at elevations between 1,500–3,200 m (4,900–10,500 ft). It is found in the Cajamarca, La Libertad, and Lambayeque departments of northwestern Peru as well as in the Loja and Tungurahua provinces of southern Ecuador. It occurs in a variety of habitats including forests, shrublands and pasturelands. The collection sites typically have dry seasons. The geographic range is broad, but the elevation range is fairly narrow.

== Conservation status ==
In 2012, the authors of the original description made a preliminary assessment of the conservation status (which was data deficient at the time), weighing up the broad geographical range and the fact it had not been commonly collected (in under 10 different places) and concluding that it may be rare. However, they found the plant to be suited to human-induced habitat change. The 2022 assessment by the IUCN classified the species as least concern, as it occurs in a wide range of habitats. However, climate change could cause habitat fragmentation and limit the plant's geographic range.

== Bibliography ==
- Baldaszti, L.C. (2024). "Solanum baretiae". IUCN Red List of Threatened Species. 2024 e.T212622664A212629093. doi:10.2305/IUCN.UK.2024-1.RLTS.T212622664A212629093.en.
- Gelbart, Nina (2021). Minerva's French Sisters: Women of Science in Enlightenment France. New Haven: Yale University Press. ISBN 978-0-300-25843-1.
- Mustain, Andrea (2012-01-04). "Female Explorer Gets Her Due, 2 Centuries Later". Live Science.
- Tepe, Eric J.; Ridley, Glynis; Bohs, Lynn (2012). "A new species of Solanum named for Jeanne Baret, an overlooked contributor to the history of botany". PhytoKeys (8): 37–47. Bibcode:2012PhytK...8...37T. doi:10.3897/phytokeys.8.2101. ISSN 1314-2003. PMC 3254248. PMID 22287929.
- Thiers, Barbara M. (2020). Herbarium: the quest to preserve & classify the world's plants. Portland, Oregon: Timber Press. ISBN 978-1-60469-930-2.
- Timaná, Martín E. (2023-12-11). "Honoring Jeanne Baret: Baretia lanata Timaná, comb. nov. (Caryophyllaceae), a new endemic genus and species combination for the Flora of Chile". Adansonia. 45 (27). Bibcode:2023Adan...45...27T. doi:10.5252/adansonia2023v45a27. ISSN 1280-8571.
- Wheeler, Quentin (2012-04-07). "New to nature No 70: Solanum baretiae". The Guardian. ISSN 0261-3077.
- "Stellaria L." World Flora Online.
