= Jean François Denis de Keredern de Trobriand =

French Navy officer (1730–1780)

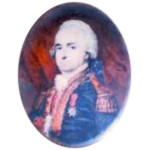
- Born: 29 January 1730 Plouigneau, France
- Died: 18 February 1780 (aged 50) Brest, France
- Branch: French Navy
- Rank: captain
- Conflicts: American Revolutionary War

Jean François Denis de Keredern de Trobriand (Note: Also written "Trobriant") (Plouigneau, 29 January 1730 – Brest, 18 February 1780) was a French Navy officer. He notably served during the American Revolutionary War.

== Biography ==
Trobriand was born to the family of Vincente Roulin and of Jean-Élie Denis de Keredern de Trobriand. He was half-brother to François-Marie Denis de Keredern de Trobriand, cousin to Jean François Sylvestre Denis de Trobriand, and uncle to François-Marie Denis de Keredern de Trobriand, who all served in the Navy. Trobriand married Geneviève Poissonnier des Perrières.

Trobriand joined the Navy as a Gardes de la Marine on 1 April 1748.

He was promoted to Ensign on 23 May 1754.

He was promoted to Lieutenant on 15 January 1762. On 1 January 1773, he was given command of the fluyt Étoile in Lorient. Between 1773 and 1777, she sailed to China and in the Indian Ocean. In 1773, Trobriand explored Denis Island, which was named in his honour. In 1775, Étoile was in Borneo, where Trobriand was offered two islands for France, the largest one being Lemukutan. Étoile surveilled the South-Western coast of Borneo. During the voyage, Étoile received orders to mount a punitive expedition against Pangaram Serip, King of Koti, at the mouth of the Mahakam River, in retaliation for the massacre of the crew of the merchantman Épreuve. Étoile attacked the port held by Pangaram Serip, along with the frigate Indiscrète, under Boucault, and Badine, under Le Veyer de Beuzidou, destroying or capturing 31 ships, and killing around 300 people.

He was promoted to Captain on 4 April 1777.

In 1778, Trobriand captained the 50-gun Amphion, part of the White-and-blue squadron under Du Chaffault in the fleet under Orvilliers. He took part in the Battle of Ushant on 27 July 1778. Seriously damaged, Amphion returned to Brest while the fight was still raging, carrying the first news of the battle. In consequence, Trobriand was replaced at the command of Amphion.

In 1779 and 1780, Trobriand commanded the 64-gun Alexandre. In February 1780, he transferred to Éveillé, but died a few days later.
