= Randayan =

Island in Indonesia

Randayan is a small island on the coast of West Kalimantan, Indonesia covering an area of approximately 4.5 hectares.

== Description ==
Located within the administrative region of Bengkayang Regency, the island can be accessed via sea travel from Teluk Suak or Pasir Panjang. Randayan is surrounded by shallow waters with a well-preserved marine ecosystem, including coral reefs, various fish species, and other marine life. On land, the island features a small forest with natural tropical vegetation, serving as a habitat for several species of birds and small animals, making it a popular spot for nature enthusiasts.

This island is part of the Lemukutan Besar Islands group, known for its diverse underwater world and natural terrestrial ecosystems. Randayan is also a crucial habitat for hawksbill turtles (Eretmochelys imbricata) and green turtles (Chelonia mydas), which frequently lay their eggs year-round, with the peak nesting season occurring between December and March. The marine ecosystem of Randayan includes 4.5 hectares of live coral, 3.69 hectares of dead coral, 0.69 hectares of seagrass, and 4.77 hectares of sand. The waters are home to various species of reef fish such as groupers, snappers, and trevallies, as well as marine predators like Chaetodon lunula and Chaetodon trifascialis, which maintain the balance of the food chain. Other marine life, including sea cucumbers, lobsters, starfish, and clams, further enrich the complementary ecosystem. This makes Randayan a vital conservation area for biodiversity in West Kalimantan.

The main activities on Randayan Island include snorkeling and diving, as its crystal-clear waters allow visitors to directly observe the underwater ecosystem. The island is also a popular destination for fishing and land exploration, although the available tourist facilities remain basic. Visitors are welcome at any time without restrictions, but they are encouraged to adhere to conservation principles and maintain cleanliness to support the island's environmental preservation. Randayan is not only an exciting destination for underwater exploration but also for observing marine wildlife conservation efforts, such as turtle protection, making it a unique and ecologically significant travel destination.
