= Andrew Hollis =

British astronomer

Andrew John Hollis (3 February 1947 – 21 November 2005) was a British astronomer, chartered engineer and chartered loss adjuster. He was the founding director of the Asteroids and Remote Planets Section of the British Astronomical Association (BAA) and was a pioneer in astronomical photoelectric photometry.

== Early life and family ==
Hollis was born in Cambridge and grew up there and in Hatfield, Hertfordshire. His father was a manager for Ind Coope. He also had a strong connection to Norfolk through his grandparents' home and, later, his father's place of retirement. His early interests included canal boats, railways and astronomy, and he later became interested in constructing computers. He was a lifelong supporter of Norwich City F.C. He and his brother, Richard, went to St. Alban's School. He played rugby, cricket, bowls and 10-pin bowling. He studied at Imperial College, London, becoming a BSc in Civil Engineering and an Associate of the City and Guilds of London Institute.

He met Ruth Muriel Hirst in 1971 at the British Transport Docks Board (BTDB) in Hull. They married in 1972 and moved to Redditch in 1973. They had three children, Angela, Julia and Christopher, before moving to Cheshire.

== Career ==
Hollis had acquired further training at the BTDB from 1969, before working as a structural engineer in many municipal design projects in central and northern England, eventually becoming a regional project manager. From 1992, after an economic downturn in structural engineering, he qualified as a chartered loss adjuster for the building insurance industry.

=== Astronomy ===
He became interested in astronomy through his uncle, Donald Worton. He was elected to the BAA aged 14. In the 1960s and 1970s he made thousands of magnitude estimates for submission to the BAA sections. He constructed three telescopes and his own observatories and gave talks to local societies nationwide. In 1980, he established the Minor Planet Group and, in 1984, the Minor Planet Section (later the Asteroids and Remote Planets Section) of the BAA. In 1992, with R. Miles, he was awarded the Merlin Medal and Gift for the 1989 observations of the occultation of 28 Sagittarii by Titan.

During the 1980s he was one of the first to use rapidly advancing technology in astronomical photometry, measuring the light from asteroids, satellites and stars using equipment he built with an RCA IP21 photomultiplier at its core. His measurements of asteroids were included in his doctoral dissertation: in 1992, he obtained one of the first PhDs available through the Open University with a thesis on the shapes of asteroids and their orbital evolution. His data collected over a few decades have been a source for other astronomers and researchers, such as his observations of 1 Ceres and 4 Vesta.

In 1989, Hollis had been diagnosed with multiple sclerosis which increasingly affected his life and work despite his stoicism. He died in 2005 after a year-long battle with cancer.

== Legacy ==
Hollis's proudest honour was that the asteroid 4084 Hollis (previously 1985 GM), a 29-kilometre member of the Koronis family with a near-circular orbit, was so named to recognise his astronomical contributions upon the recommendation of its discoverer, Ted Bowell. The International Astronomical Union has also honoured him by informally naming a crater in Hayabusa Terra on Pluto 'Hollis Crater'.

== See also ==
List of geological features on Pluto
