= French fluyt Étoile (1767) =

Ship of the French Navy

History

France
- Name: Étoile
- Namesake: "Star"
- Builder: Nantes shipyard
- Laid down: 1759
- Launched: 1762
- Acquired: 4 August 1762
- In service: August 1762
- Out of service: 1780
- Fate: Hulked 1780, last mentioned 1789

General characteristics
- Class & type: Fluyt used as storeship
- Displacement: 480 tonnes
- Length: 33.8 m (111 ft)
- Beam: 9.1 m (30 ft)
- Propulsion: Sail
- Capacity: 8 officers and 108 men
- Armament: 14 × 8-pounder long guns; 20 × 6-pounders
- Armour: timber

Étoile (French: [etwal]; "Star") was an 18th-century fluyt of the French Navy. She was originally a merchantman named Placelière and was purchased by the Navy while still on the stocks. She was renamed Étoile in April 1763 and re-classed as a corvette. She is famous for being one of Louis Antoine de Bougainville's ships in his circumnavigation between 1766 and 1769, along with Boudeuse.

== Career ==
Étoile was originally built between 1759 and 1762 as a fluyt named Placelière and was purchased while still on the stocks for King Louis XIV's Navy on 4 August 1762. She was pierced for 20 guns.

Étoile sailed to Rochefort on 22 December 1763.

On 15 November 1766, Étoile departed Saint-Malo, along with Boudeuse, for an exploration voyage under Bougainville. She was under Chenard de la Giraudais, and was the storeship of the expedition. She carried naturalist and physician Philibert Commerçon, astronomer Pierre-Antoine Veron, and Jeanne Baré, who was recognised as the first woman to have completed a voyage of circumnavigation. During much of the voyage, Baré was disguised as a man.

In January 1771, Étoile was at Ile d'Aix under Cramahé. In April, she was at Brest.

On 1 January 1773, Denis de Keredern de Trobriand was given command of Étoile in Lorient. Between 1773 and 1777, she sailed to China and in the Indian Ocean. In 1775, she was in Borneo, where Trobriand was offered two islands for France, the largest one being Lemukutan. Étoile surveilled the South-Western coast of Borneo. During the voyage, Étoile received orders to mount a punitive expedition against Pangaram Serip, King of Koti, at the mouth of the Mahakam River, in retaliation for the massacre of the crew of the merchantman Épreuve. Étoile attacked the port held by Pangaram Serip, along with the frigate Indiscrète, under Boucault, and Badine, under Le Veyer de Beuzidou, destroying or capturing 31 ships, and killing around 300 people.

== Fate ==
In May 1779, she became a prison hulk in Lorient. She is last mentioned in 1789.
