= Penata =

Two islands in Indonesia

Coordinates: 0°44′N 108°45′E

Penata is the name for two adjacent small islands located in the waters of West Kalimantan, namely Penata Besar Island and Penata Kecil Island. Administratively, these two islands are part of Bengkayang Regency.

== Description ==
Penata Besar Island and Penata Kecil Island are closest to Lemukutan Island in the waters of West Kalimantan. Both islands are surrounded by shallow waters and have important marine ecosystems, including coral reefs that are habitats for various types of fish and other marine biota. In addition, these islands are also connected to the traditions of coastal communities, most of whom work as fishermen.

Penata Besar Island has a larger area than Penata Kecil, with a landscape dominated by small hills and tropical vegetation. The island is inhabited by several locals who depend on fishing activities, especially through traditional bagan. This area is often used by fishermen as a landing place because it is protected from wind and waves. On the other hand, Penata Kecil Island, as the name suggests, is smaller in area and is not permanently inhabited. The island has simpler geographical characteristics with limited white sandy beaches. Both are part of a marine conservation area that aims to protect the surrounding marine biodiversity.

These two islands have similar physical characteristics, namely hilly with gentle topography in some parts of the coast. Their strategic location in the Karimata Strait makes these two islands part of the natural migration route of marine biota. In addition, the existence of these islands also supports the sustainability of coastal ecosystems through the protection of well-maintained marine and land habitats.
