= Baret Montes =

Blocky mountain range on Pluto

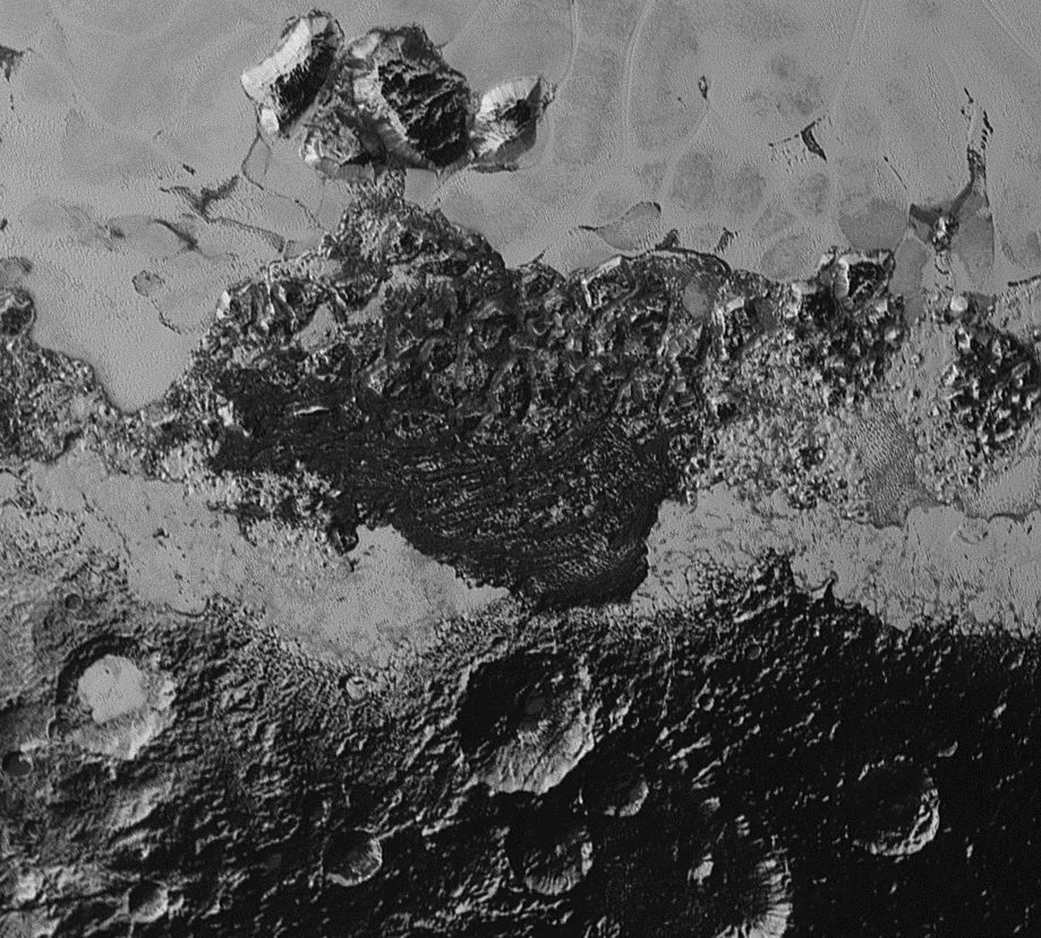
- Baret Montes is the dark outcrop near the center, with Zheng He Montes at the top of the image.
- Feature type: Mountain range
- Location: Western Sputnik Planitia, Pluto
- Coordinates: 14.60°N 157.80°E
- Discoverer: New Horizons
- Eponym: Jeanne Baret (1740–1807)

Baret Montes (formerly Baré Montes) is a chain of mountains on the surface of the dwarf planet Pluto. It is located near the western border of Sputnik Planitia in Tombaugh Regio. These mountains were first viewed by the New Horizons spacecraft. It features large ridges that are formed by the compression of methane and water ice.

The mountains are named after Jeanne Baret, a French explorer and first woman to have completed a circumnavigation voyage of the globe. The New Horizons team suggested this name in 2015, and it was officially approved by the International Astronomical Union in April 2018.

== See also ==
- Geography of Pluto
- Geology of Pluto
- List of geological features on Pluto
