= Le Ponthou =

Le Ponthou Ar Pontoù
- Part of Plouigneau
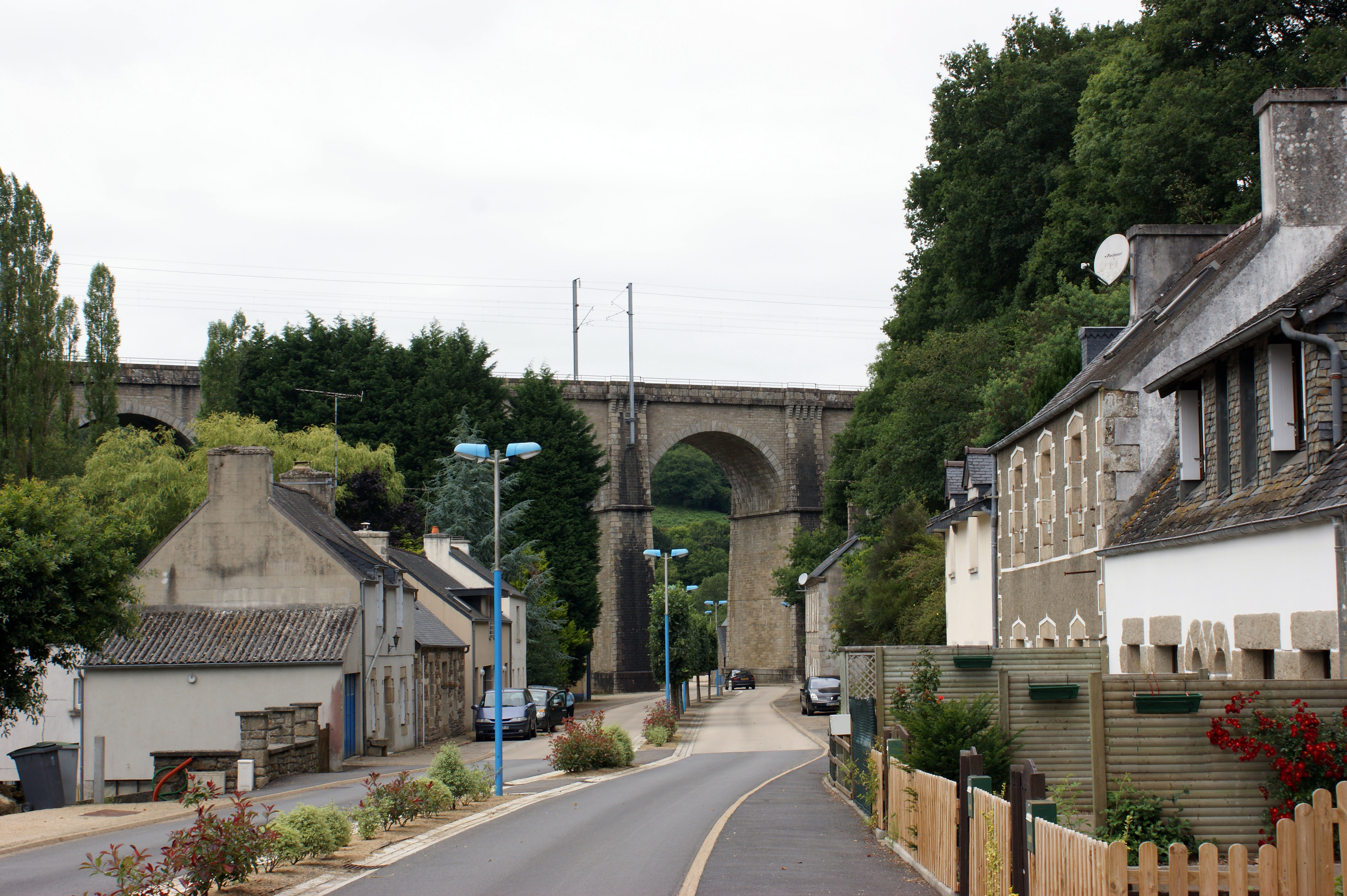
- The town and the viaduct of the Paris-Brest railway line

- Coat of arms
- Location of Le Ponthou
- Location within France Location within Brittany
- Coordinates: 48°33′58″N 3°38′14″W
- Country: France
- Region: Brittany
- Department: Finistère
- Arrondissement: Morlaix
- Canton: Plouigneau
- Commune: Plouigneau
- Area^{1}: 1.34 km^{2} (0.52 sq mi)
- Highest elevation: 162 m (531 ft)
- Lowest elevation: 72 m (236 ft)
- Population (2022): 141
  - Density: 105/km^{2} (273/sq mi)
- Time zone: UTC+01:00 (CET)
  - Summer (DST): UTC+02:00 (CEST)
- Postal code: 29650
- ^{1} French Land Register data, which excludes lakes, ponds, glaciers > 1 km^{2} (0.386 sq mi or 247 acres) and river estuaries.

Le Ponthou (French pronunciation: [lə pɔ̃tu]; Breton: Ar Pontoù) is a commune in the Finistère department of Brittany in north-western France. On 1 January 2019, it was merged into the commune Plouigneau.

== Population ==
Inhabitants of Le Ponthou are called in French Ponthousiens.

== See also ==
- Communes of the Finistère department
