= Cadejo Macula =

Small dark surface region on Pluto

- An annotated map of Pluto, with Cadejo Macula just northwest of Voyager Terra
- Feature type: Dark region
- Location: Pluto
- Coordinates: 60°N 150°E
- Discoverer: New Horizons
- Eponym: Cadejo

Cadejo Macula (/kəˈdeɪhoʊ/) is a small dark surface feature on Pluto near Voyager Terra. It is unofficially named after El Cadejo, a hellish spirit from Central American folklore which appears in the form of a large dog-like creature with burning red eyes. The feature was photographed by the New Horizons probe during the July 2015 flyby of the dwarf planet.
