= Morgoth Macula =

Dark region on Pluto

- Feature type: Macula
- Location: Pluto
- Coordinates: 20°S 172°E
- Discoverer: New Horizons
- Eponym: Morgoth

Morgoth Macula /ˈmɔːrɡɒθ/ is the informal name for a small dark region on the surface of Pluto, southwest of the Norgay Montes and adjacent to Sputnik Planitia. It was discovered in 2015 by the spacecraft New Horizons and named after Morgoth, the primary antagonist in J.R.R. Tolkien's legendarium.
