= Luna Linea =

Dark linear feature on Pluto

- Annotated map of the surface features of Pluto as viewed by New Horizons. Luna Linea is in the far left side of the map.
- Feature type: Dark linear feature
- Location: Anti-encounter hemisphere, Pluto
- Coordinates: 19.88°N 22.78°E
- Length: ~220 km (Note: The length of Luna Linea is listed under "diameter" in the Gazetteer of Planetary Nomenclature database.)
- Discoverer: New Horizons
- Eponym: Luna program, first spacecraft to visit the Moon

Luna Linea is a dark linear feature (linea) on the dwarf planet Pluto. It was discovered by the New Horizons craft in July 2015 and named after the Luna program, a Soviet space exploration program that was the first to visit the Moon. The name was officially approved by the International Astronomical Union (IAU) on 11 April 2023.

== Geology ==
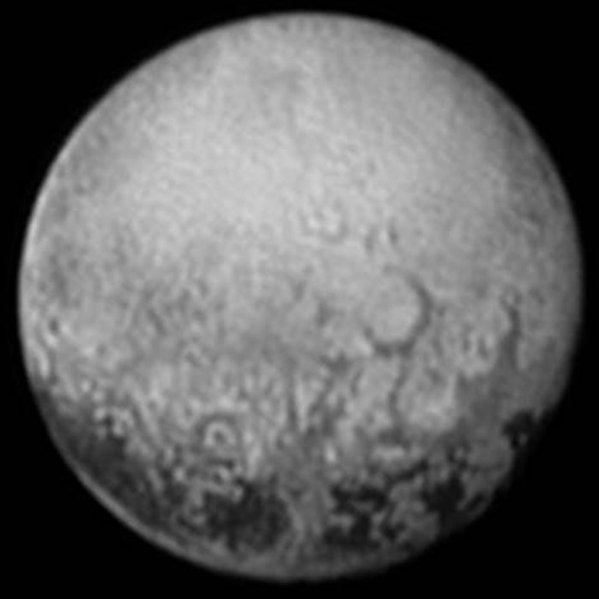
Pluto's far side as imaged by the New Horizons spacecraft on approach to Pluto. Luna Linea extends across the lower right

As Luna Linea was located on the opposite hemisphere (referred to as the far side or anti-encounter hemisphere) of Pluto when New Horizons was at closest approach, it was not imaged in detail. Nevertheless, Luna Linea is located in a region with several other linear dark features, including Chandrayaan Linea and Yutu Linea. The concentration of these linear features on Pluto's far side may relate to the ridge-trough system (RTS), a massive band of tectonized terrain which extends north to south across much of Pluto's encounter hemisphere. However, the alignment of Luna Linea and the other lineae does not appear to support this. Alternatively, the dark lineae may represent a region of disrupted terrain that formed due to the impact event which created Sputnik Planitia, as seismic energy from the impact may have concentrated at Sputnik Planitia's antipode, fracturing Pluto's crust. Luna Linea may be an eastern outlier of this antipodal terrain, or it may have formed by unrelated means.

== See also ==
- Geology of Pluto – Geologic structure and composition of Pluto
