= Damon Simonelli =

Damon Paul Simonelli
- Born: 15 August 1959; Bronx, New York, United States of America
- Died: 1 December 2004 (aged 45); Pasadena
- Education: The Bronx High School of Science, Cornell University
- Occupation(s): Physicist, Astronomer, Planetary scientist
- Employer(s): Cornell University, NASA Ames Research Center, NASA Jet Propulsion Laboratory

Damon Paul Simonelli (15 August 1959 – 1 December 2004) was a planetary scientist who worked for Cornell University and the National Aeronautics and Space Administration (NASA) in the U.S. He was a pioneer in the development of radiative transfer models to analyze astronomical objects.

== Early life and family ==
Simonelli was born in the Bronx, New York, to Alice Kennard, a secretary at Montefiore Medical Center, and Aldo Simonelli, a clarinetist for the New York City Opera Company and lead negotiator for the local musician's union to the City Opera. As a child, Damon showed a keen interest in space exploration, astronomy and science fiction. He attended the Bronx High School of Science. .

== Research career ==
Simonelli graduated from Cornell University with a BA summa cum laude in physics in 1980. He continued at Cornell in a research role, developing the area of quantitative radiative transfer with Joe Veverka to characterise the surface of planets, and he also studied the post-eclipse brightening of Jupiter's moon, Io. His PhD in Astronomy and Space Sciences was gained with a thesis on the properties of Io's surface.

At the NASA Ames Research Center, Simonelli was a National Research Council (NRC) Fellowship, working on the structure of Pluto and its moons with Jim Pollack, Ray Reynolds and Chris McKay. He maintained that, because of its rockier composition, Pluto formed in a carbon monoxide-rich outer solar nebula rather than a planetary nebula surrounding the dwarf planet. Simonelli and Ray Reynolds suggested that Pluto's density is a result of a collision which also created its largest moon, Charon.

From 1991, after returning to Cornell, Simonelli led a team studying smaller bodies in the Solar System, for example the satellites Io, Phoebe, Thebe, Amalthea, Metis and Phobos, and the asteroids 243 Ida, 951 Gaspra and 52 Europa. His expertise in planning observations and command sequences for the Galileo spacecraft earned him NASA's Superior Performance Award.

In 2002, he accepted another NRC Fellowship, this time at NASA's Jet Propulsion Laboratory. Here he planned observations using the Visible and Infrared Mapping Spectrometer, as part of the Cassini spacecraft's observations of Saturn's satellite Titan. Simonelli collaborated on NASA's New Horizons mission to Pluto and beyond which was launched in 2006.

== Personal life and legacy ==
He died of heart failure at his home near Pasadena. Asteroid 8071 Simonelli was named in his honour. The International Astronomical Union has also informally named a Plutonian crater Simonelli in his honour

== See also ==
- List of geological features on Pluto
