= French ship Amphion (1749) =

Ship of the line of the French Navy

History

France
- Name: Amphion
- Namesake: "Amphion"
- Ordered: 19 January 1748
- Builder: Brest
- Laid down: 1748
- Launched: 28 July 1749
- Decommissioned: September 1787
- In service: 1750
- Fate: Broken up 1787

General characteristics
- Displacement: 1740 tonneaux
- Tons burthen: 900 port tonneaux
- Length: 47.1 metres
- Beam: 13.0 metres
- Draught: 6.3 metres
- Propulsion: Sail
- Armament: 50 to 54 guns

Amphion was a 50-gun ship of the line of the French Navy.

== Career ==
Amphion took part in the Battle of Ushant on 27 July 1778 under Keredern de Trobriand. Seriously damaged, Amphion returned to Brest while the fight was still raging, carrying the first news of the battle. In consequence, Trobriand was replaced at the command of Amphion.

She took part in the Battle of Grenada on 6 July 1779, where her captain, Ferron du Quengo, was killed. The same month, she ran aground at Cap-Haïtien at Saint-Domingue.

Amphion took part in the action of 20 March 1780, along with Annibal, Diadème and Réfléchi.

== Fate ==
Amphion was broken up in Rochefort in 1787.
