= Plouigneau =

Plouigneau Plouigno
- Commune
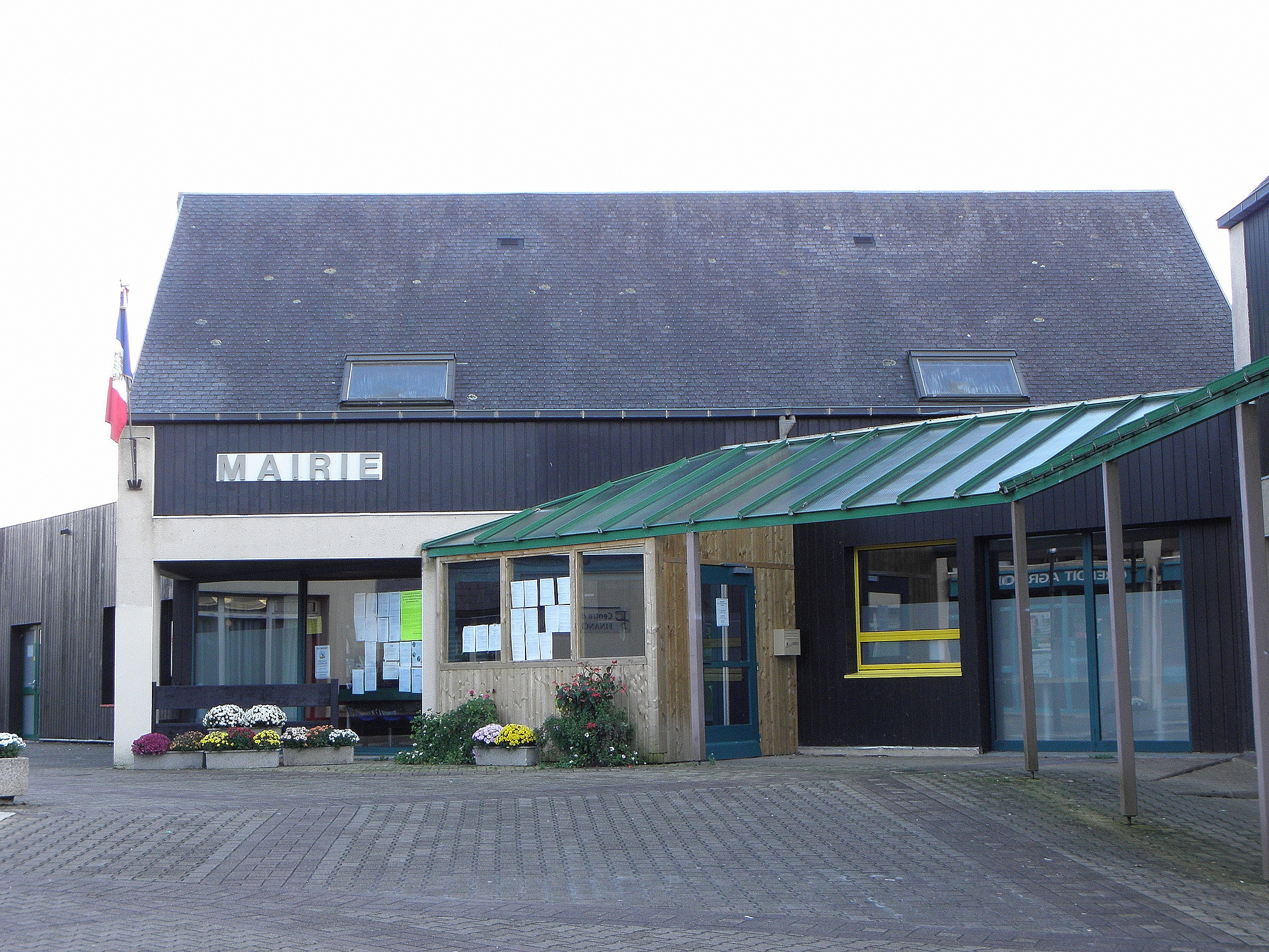
- The town hall in Plouigneau

- Coat of arms
- Location of Plouigneau
- Location within France Location within Brittany
- Coordinates: 48°34′06″N 3°42′00″W
- Country: France
- Region: Brittany
- Department: Finistère
- Arrondissement: Morlaix
- Canton: Plouigneau
- Intercommunality: Morlaix Communauté

Government
  - Mayor (2020–2026): Joëlle Huon
- Area^{1}: 64.82 km^{2} (25.03 sq mi)
- Highest elevation: 201 m (659 ft)
- Lowest elevation: 17 m (56 ft)
- Population (2023): 5,014
  - Density: 77.35/km^{2} (200.3/sq mi)
- Time zone: UTC+01:00 (CET)
  - Summer (DST): UTC+02:00 (CEST)
- INSEE/Postal code: 29199 /29610
- ^{1} French Land Register data, which excludes lakes, ponds, glaciers > 1 km^{2} (0.386 sq mi or 247 acres) and river estuaries.

Plouigneau (French pronunciation: [pluiɲo]; Breton: Plouigno) is a commune in the Finistère department of Brittany in north-western France. On 1 January 2019 the commune of Le Ponthou was merged into Plouigneau.

== Population ==
Inhabitants of Plouigneau are called in French Ignaciens. Population data refer to the commune in its geography as of January 2025.

Historical population
Year	Pop.	±% p.a.
1968	2,971	—
1975	3,280	+1.42%
1982	3,726	+1.84%
1990	4,150	+1.36%
1999	4,252	+0.27%
2007	4,657	+1.14%
2012	4,985	+1.37%
2017	5,083	+0.39%
2023	5,014	−0.23%
Source: INSEE

== See also ==
- Communes of the Finistère department
