= Kabung =

Island in Indonesia

Coordinates: 0°49′52″N 108°46′58″E

Kabung is a small island located in the waters of West Kalimantan, Indonesia.

== Description ==
=== Location ===
This island is located in Karimunting Tourism village, Sungai Raya Islands District, Bengkayang Regency, West Kalimantan.

=== Tourism and accessibility ===
Kabung Island is known for its pristine natural beauty, with clear waters, and pristine coral reefs. The island is a marine tourism destination that is popular with local and foreign tourists for activities such as snorkeling, diving, and fishing. In addition, the lives of the local people who mostly work as fishermen add to the cultural appeal of this island. Access to Kabung Island can be reached by sea using a boat from the Teluk Suak pier in Bengkayang.
