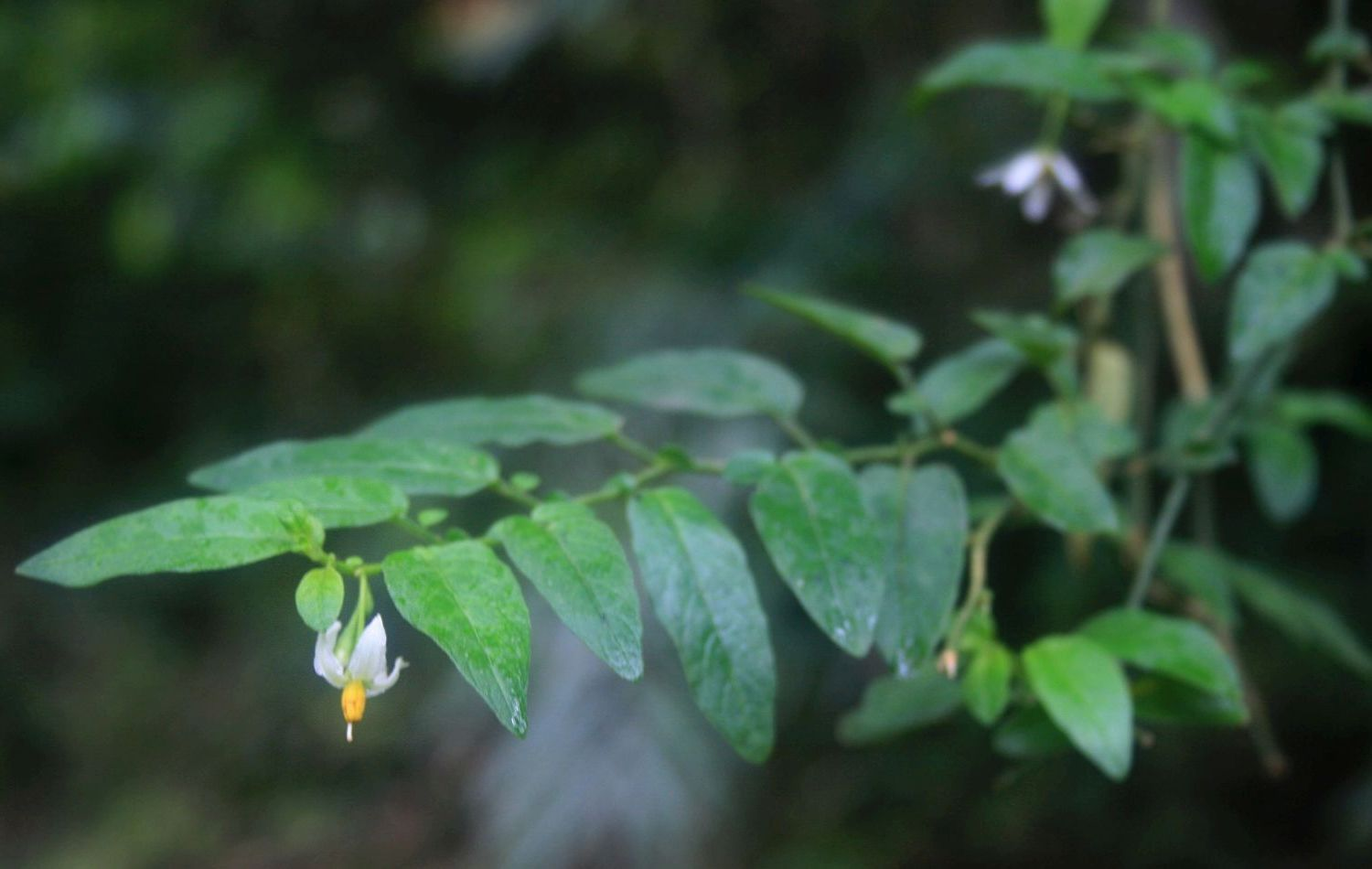
- Solanum sodiroi

Scientific classification
- Kingdom: Plantae
- Clade: Tracheophytes
- Clade: Angiosperms
- Clade: Eudicots
- Clade: Asterids
- Order: Solanales
- Family: Solanaceae
- Genus: Solanum
- Species: S. sodiroi

Binomial name
- Solanum sodiroi Bitter

Synonyms
- See text

= Solanum sodiroi =

Species of flowering plant

Solanum sodiroi is a species of plant in the family Solanaceae. It is possibly endemic to Ecuador.

The specific epithet of sodiroi refers to Luis Sodiro (1836–1909), who was an Italian Jesuit priest and a field botanist, who collected many plants in Ecuador.

S. carchiense as described by Correll is an invalid name for this plant that is sometimes still seen. Altogether, the following synonyms are assigned to this species:

- Solanum carchiense Correll
- Solanum sodiroi var. dimorphophyllum (Bitter) Correll
- Solanum sodiroi ssp. dimorphophyllum Bitter
- Solanum tetrapetalum Rusby

The mysterious S. carchiense was classified as Endangered by the IUCN before it was synonymized with the more widespread S. sodiroi.

== Footnotes ==
- Montúfar, R.; Pitman, N. (2004). "Solanum carchiense". IUCN Red List of Threatened Species. 2004 e.T46325A11048844. doi:10.2305/IUCN.UK.2004.RLTS.T46325A11048844.en.
- Solanaceae Source [2008]: Solanum sodiroi. Retrieved 2008-SEP-30.
