= Adlivun Cavus =

Small depression on the surface of Pluto

- Feature type: cavus
- Location: Southern Sputnik Planitia, Pluto
- Coordinates: 15°24′S 188°51′E
- Diameter: ~21.4 km
- Discoverer: New Horizons
- Naming: adlivun spirits

Adlivun Cavus is a small depression on the southern tip of Sputnik Planitia, which is a basin on the dwarf planet Pluto. It was discovered by the New Horizons spacecraft in 2015.

The name is from the Inuktitut adlivun, "those beneath us", referring to the souls of the departed and by extension to the underworld itself. The name was officially approved by the International Astronomical Union in 2017.
