= Jeanne Baret =

French explorer, naturalist, botanist (1740–1807)

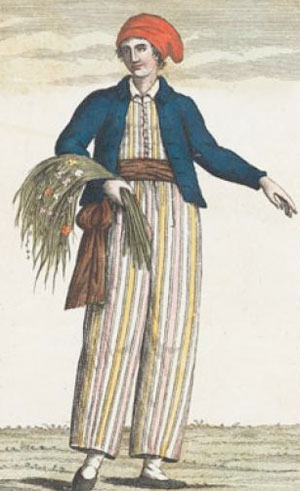
- Allegorical portrait of Jeanne Baret dressed as a sailor, dating from 1817, after her death.
- Born: 27 July 1740; La Comelle, Burgundy, France
- Died: 5 August 1807 (aged 67); Saint-Antoine-de-Breuilh, Dordogne, France
- Other names: Jean Baret, Jeanne de Bonnefoi, Jeanne Barré
- Occupations: housekeeper, valet, botanist, tavern-keeper
- Spouse: Jean Dubernat (1774–1807)
- Partner: Philibert Commerson (1760s–1773)

Jeanne Baret (French: [ʒan baʁɛ]; 27 July 1740 – 5 August 1807) was a French explorer, naturalist, and botanist who is recognised as the first woman to have completed a voyage of circumnavigation of the globe, which she did aboard ship. A key part of her journey was as a member of Louis Antoine de Bougainville's expedition on the ships Boudeuse and Étoile in 1766–1769.

Baret joined the expedition disguised as a man, calling herself Jean Baret. She enlisted as valet and assistant to the expedition's naturalist, Philibert Commerson, shortly before Bougainville's ships sailed from France. According to Bougainville's account, Baret was an expert botanist.

== Early life ==
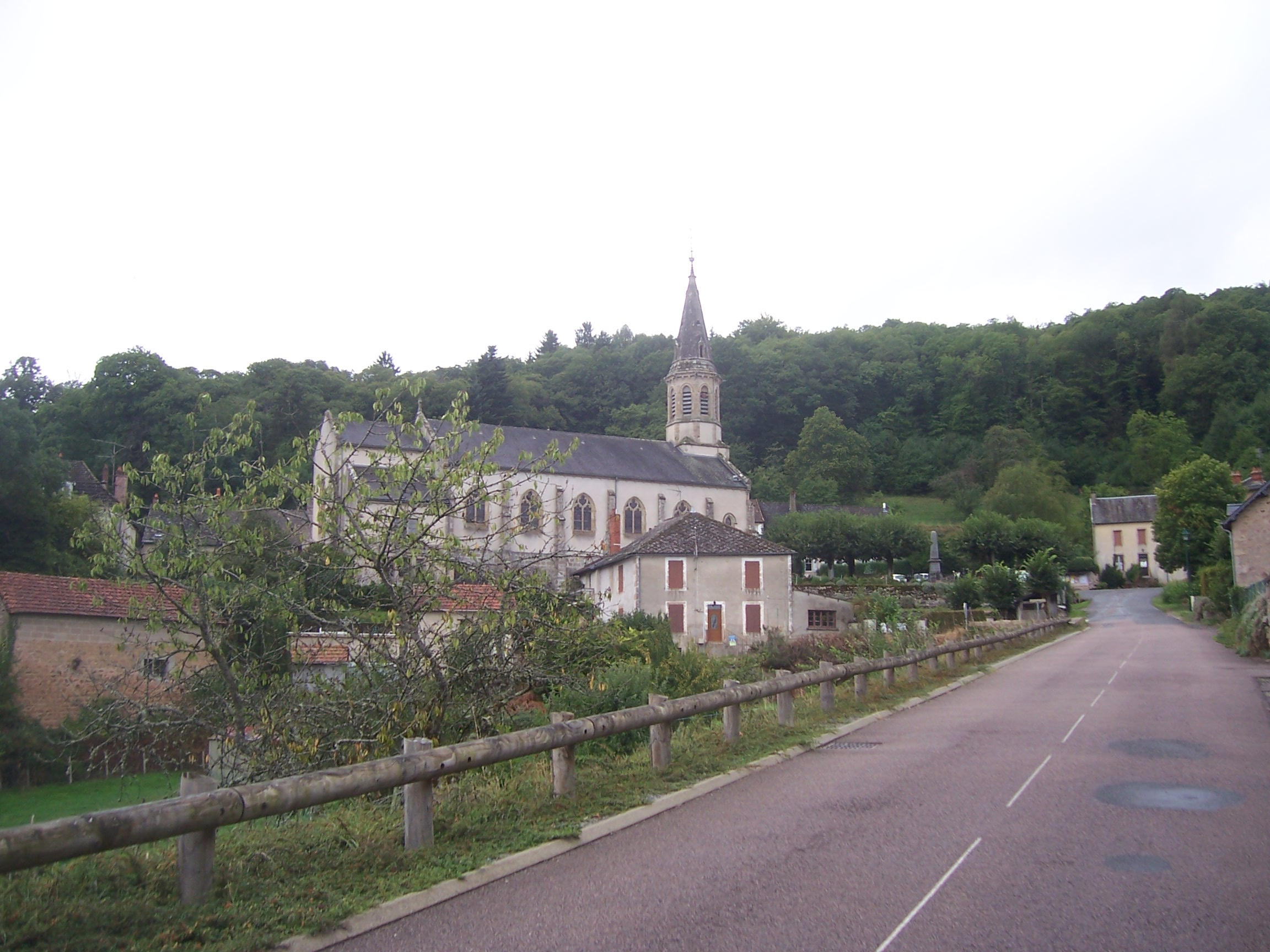
The village of La Comelle, where Baret was born

Jeanne Baret was born on 27 July 1740, in the village of La Comelle in the Burgundy region of France, and baptized the next day. Her record of baptism survives and identifies her as the legitimate issue of Jean Baret and Jeanne Pochard. Her father is identified as a day laborer and is likely to have been illiterate. Her mother died in November 1741 (according to the parish records at the age of 45); her father then married Antoinette Mangematin, who died in 1745, and then Jeanne Teuvenot, who died in 1747 at the age of 40. Baret's father died in December 1755; the register of his death and burial mentions a son Pierre Baret (born 1734) as well as a son-in-law, indicating that Jeanne Baret had a brother and a sister.

Overall, next to nothing is known of Baret's childhood or young adulthood, and she does not reappear in official records until 1764. Her biographer Danielle Clode speculates that she lived with her sister's family in Rosières, close to Toulon-sur-Arroux. How Baret obtained an education is unknown, but she had learned to write by 1764 as evidenced by her signature on an official document. (Note: Her biographer John Dunmore suggests she might have been taught by the parish priest or taken on as a charity case by a member of the local gentry. Another biographer, Glynis Ridley, suggests her mother was of Huguenot extraction, a group that had a higher tradition of literacy than was otherwise typical of the peasant classes of the time, and taught her daughter to read. Clode dismisses any possibility that Baret's mother taught her to read since she died when her child was no more than 15 months old, as well as her mother's Huguenot origin theory.)

== Relationship with Commerson ==
Philibert Commerson was born in 1727 in Châtillon-sur-Chalaronne as the son of a lawyer. He studied medicine at the University of Montpellier and qualified as a doctor in 1754, by which time he was a passionate botanist. On 17 October 1760, he married Antoinette Beau, the well-to do daughter of a lawyer. He then settled as the town doctor in Toulon-sur-Arroux, where his brother-in-law François Beau was the parish priest. Three days after giving birth to their son Anne-François Archambaud in April 1762, Commerson's wife died.

At some point between 1760 and 1764, Baret became employed as Commerson's housekeeper. It seems most likely that Baret took over management of Commerson's household at the time of his wife's death, if not before. It is also evident that Baret and Commerson shared a more personal relationship, as Baret became pregnant in 1764. French law at that time required women who became pregnant out of wedlock to make a déclaration de grossesse ('declaration of pregnancy') in which they could name the father of their unborn child. Baret made this declaration quite late, when she was five months pregnant. Baret's certificate, from 22 August 1764, survives; it was filed in Digoin, a town 30 kilometres (19 mi) away and witnessed by two men of substance who likewise had travelled a considerable distance from their homes. Baret refused to name the father of her child, but historians do not doubt that it was Commerson and that it was he who had also made the arrangements with the lawyer and witnesses on her behalf. In his will, Commerson later declared that Baret had entered his service on 6 September 1764, two weeks after she had declared her pregnancy.

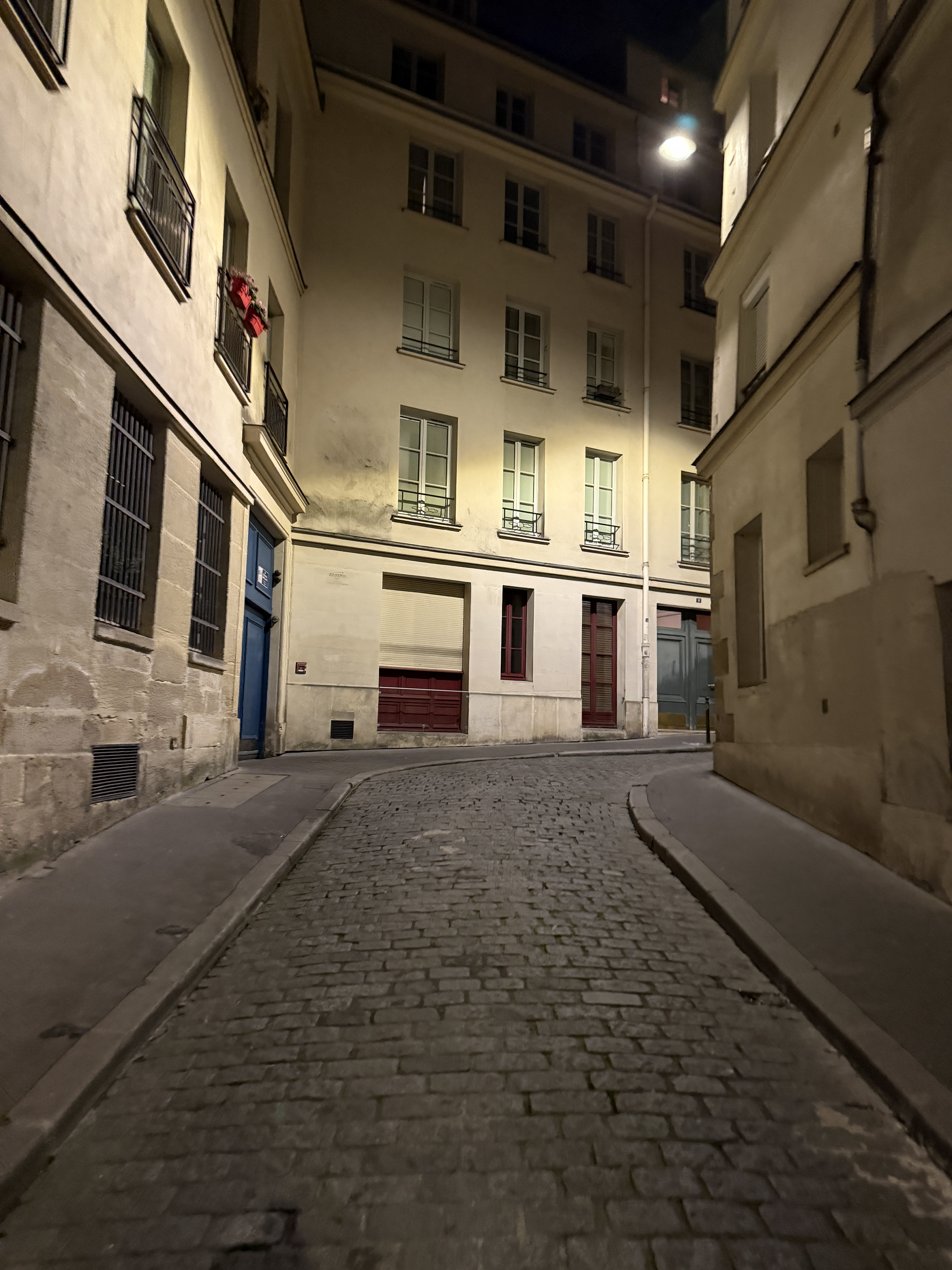
13 Rue des Boulangers (on the left), where Baret lived with Commerson

Shortly after the declaration of pregnancy, Baret and Commerson moved together to Paris to escape the increasing rumours circulating in Toulon-sur-Arroux. Commerson rented a second floor apartment at no. 13, Rue des Boulangers. Possibly to disguise her identity, Baret used the name "Jeanne de Bonnefoy" during this period. Her child, born in December 1764, was given the name Jean-Pierre Barret. With assistance of the Hôpital des Enfants-Trouvés (the Paris Foundlings Hospital), the child was given up for adoption in January 1765 and placed with the Wet nurse Françoise Bernage. Jean-Pierre died close to Dreux a few months later, in March 1765.

Commerson had left his legitimate son Archambault in the care of his brother-in-law François Beau in Toulon-sur-Arroux but never saw him again in his lifetime; Beau refused to send the boy to Paris. Baret had another son, Aimé Eugène Prosper Bonnefoy, who was born at the Hôtel-Dieu in Paris on 15 May 1766. The fate of this child, most likely also with Commerson, is not known; it is possible he died before 1775.

In their time in Paris, Commerson certainly instructed Baret in botany. At the nearby Jardin du Roi, where Commerson went every day, Baret had the opportunity to attend the public botany lectures of Bernard de Jussieu. Nina Gelbart speculates she and Commerson could have joined him on his regular plant collecting excursions. Baret must also have met Françoise Basseporte and could possibly have taken lessons on plant drawing from her.

In 1765, Commerson was invited to join Bougainville's expedition. He hesitated in accepting because he was often in poor health; he required Baret's assistance as a nurse as well as in running his household and managing his collections and papers. His appointment, however, allowed him a servant, paid as a royal expense, but women were completely prohibited on French navy ships at this time. At some point, the idea of Baret disguising herself as a man in order to accompany Commerson was conceived. To avoid scrutiny, she was to join the expedition immediately before the ship sailed, pretending to be a stranger to Commerson.

Before leaving Paris, Commerson drew up a will in which he left to "Jeanne Baret, known as de Bonnefoi, my housekeeper", a lump sum of 600 livres along with back wages owed and the furnishings of their Paris apartment. Thus, while the story Baret concocted for Bougainville's benefit to explain her presence on board ship was carefully designed to shield Commerson from involvement, there is clear documentary evidence of their previous relationship, and it is highly improbable that Commerson was not complicit in the plan himself.

== With Bougainville ==
Baret and Commerson joined the Bougainville expedition at the port of Rochefort in late December 1766. They were assigned to sail on the storeship, the Étoile. Because of the vast quantity of equipment Commerson was bringing on the voyage, the ship's captain, François Chenard de la Giraudais, gave up his large cabin on the ship to Commerson and his "assistant". This gave Baret significantly more privacy than she would have had otherwise on board the crowded ship. In particular, the captain's cabin gave Baret access to private toilet facilities so that she did not have to use the shared head with other members of the crew.

In addition to Bougainville's published account, Baret's story figures in three other surviving memoirs of the expedition: a journal kept jointly by Commerson and Pierre Duclos-Guyot; a journal by the Prince of Nassau-Siegen, a paying passenger on the Boudeuse; and a memoir by François Vivès, a surgeon on the Étoile. Vivès has the most to say about Baret, but his memoir is problematical because he and Commerson were on bad terms throughout the voyage, and his account – largely written or revised after the fact – is full of innuendo and spiteful comments directed at both Commerson and Baret.

Commerson suffered badly from both seasickness and a recurring ulcer on his leg in the early part of the voyage, and Baret probably spent most of her time attending to him. Aside from the ceremony of "crossing the line", which Commerson described in some detail in his memoir, there was little for the botanists to do until the Étoile reached Montevideo. There they set out on expeditions to the surrounding plains and mountains. Commerson's leg was still troubling him, and Baret seems to have done much of the actual labour, carrying supplies and specimens. In Rio de Janeiro – a much more dangerous place, where the Étoile's chaplain was murdered ashore soon after their arrival – Commerson was officially confined to the ship while his leg healed, but he and Baret nonetheless collected specimens of a flowering vine, which he named Bougainvillea.

After a second visit to Montevideo, their next opportunity to collect plants was in Patagonia while the ships of the expedition were waiting for favourable winds to carry them through the Strait of Magellan. Here Baret accompanied Commerson on the most troublesome excursions over rugged terrain and gained a reputation for courage and strength. Commerson, still hampered by his leg injury, referred to Baret as his "beast of burden" on these expeditions. In addition to the manual labour she performed in collecting plants, stones, and shells, Baret also helped Commerson organize and catalogue their specimens and notes in the weeks that followed, as the ships entered the Pacific.

Surviving accounts of the expedition differ on when Baret's sex was first discovered. According to Bougainville, rumours that Baret was a woman had circulated for some time, but her sex was not finally confirmed until the expedition reached Tahiti in April 1768. As soon as she and Commerson landed on shore, Baret was immediately surrounded by Tahitians who cried out that she was a woman. It was necessary to return her to the ship to protect her from the excited Tahitians. Bougainville recorded this incident in his journal some weeks after it happened, when he had an opportunity to visit the Étoile to interview Baret personally.

In his account, Vivès reports much speculation about Baret's sex early in the voyage and asserts that Baret claimed to be a eunuch when confronted directly by La Giraudais (whose own official log has not survived). Bougainville's account of Baret's unmasking on Tahiti is not corroborated by the other journal accounts of the expedition, although Vivès describes a similar incident in which Baret was immediately pointed out as a woman by the Tahitian Ahu-toru on board the ship. Vivès also describes a different incident on New Ireland in mid-July in which Baret was caught off-guard, stripped, and "examined" by a group of other servants on the expedition. Duclos-Guyot and Nassau-Siegen also recorded that Baret had been discovered to be a woman in New Ireland, but without mentioning details.

Ahu-toru travelled back to France with the expedition and was subsequently questioned at some length about Baret. Modern scholars now believe that Ahu-toru thought that Baret was a mahu, or third gender. However, other Tahitian natives reported the presence of a woman in Bougainville's expedition to later visitors to the island, including James Cook in 1769 and Domingo de Bonechea in 1772, which indicates that her sex was known to the Tahitians if not to her shipmates at the time she visited the island.

After crossing the Pacific, the expedition was desperately short of food. After a brief stop for supplies in the Dutch East Indies (now Indonesia), the ships made a longer stop at the island of Mauritius in the Indian Ocean. This island, then known as Isle de France, was an important French trading station. Commerson was delighted to find that his old friend and fellow botanist Pierre Poivre was serving as governor on the island, and Commerson and Baret remained behind as Poivre's guests. Bougainville probably also actively encouraged this arrangement, as it allowed him to rid himself of the problem of a woman illegally onboard his expedition.

On Mauritius, Baret continued in her role as Commerson's assistant and housekeeper. She likely accompanied him in plant-collecting on Madagascar and Bourbon Island (now called Réunion) in 1770–1772. Commerson continued to have serious health problems, and he died in Mauritius in February 1773. His financial resources had dwindled during his time on the island: his patron Poivre had been recalled to Paris. Baret, meanwhile, seems to have established herself independently, being granted property in Port Louis, the capital of Mauritius, in 1770.

== Later life ==
After Commerson's death, Baret ran a tavern in Port Louis. She was fined 50 livres for serving alcohol on Sundays in 1773. Then, on 17 May 1774, she married Jean Dubernat, a non-commissioned officer in the French Army who was most likely on the island on his way home to France. Jeanne brought a small fortune to her marriage, presumably from the tavern and perhaps other business ventures she ran on the island.

There is no record of exactly when Baret and her husband arrived in France, thus completing her voyage of circumnavigation. Most likely it was sometime in 1775. In April 1776, she received the money that was due to her under Commerson's will after applying directly to the Attorney General. With this money, she settled with Dubernat in his native village of Saint-Aulaye, Dordogne where they bought property with Jeanne's wealth and lived with both Dubernat's and Jeanne's nieces and nephews.

In 1785, Baret was granted a pension of 200 livres a year by the Ministry of Marine. The document granting her this pension makes clear the high regard with which she was held by this point:

Jeanne Barré, by means of a disguise, circumnavigated the globe on one of the vessels commanded by Mr de Bougainville. She devoted herself in particular to assisting Mr de Commerson, doctor and botanist, and shared with great courage the labours and dangers of this savant. Her behaviour was exemplary and Mr de Bougainville refers to it with all due credit.... His Lordship has been gracious enough to grant to this extraordinary woman a pension of two hundred livres a year to be drawn from the fund for invalid servicemen and this pension shall be payable from 1 January 1785.

She died in Saint-Aulaye on 5 August 1807, at the age of 67.

== Legacy ==
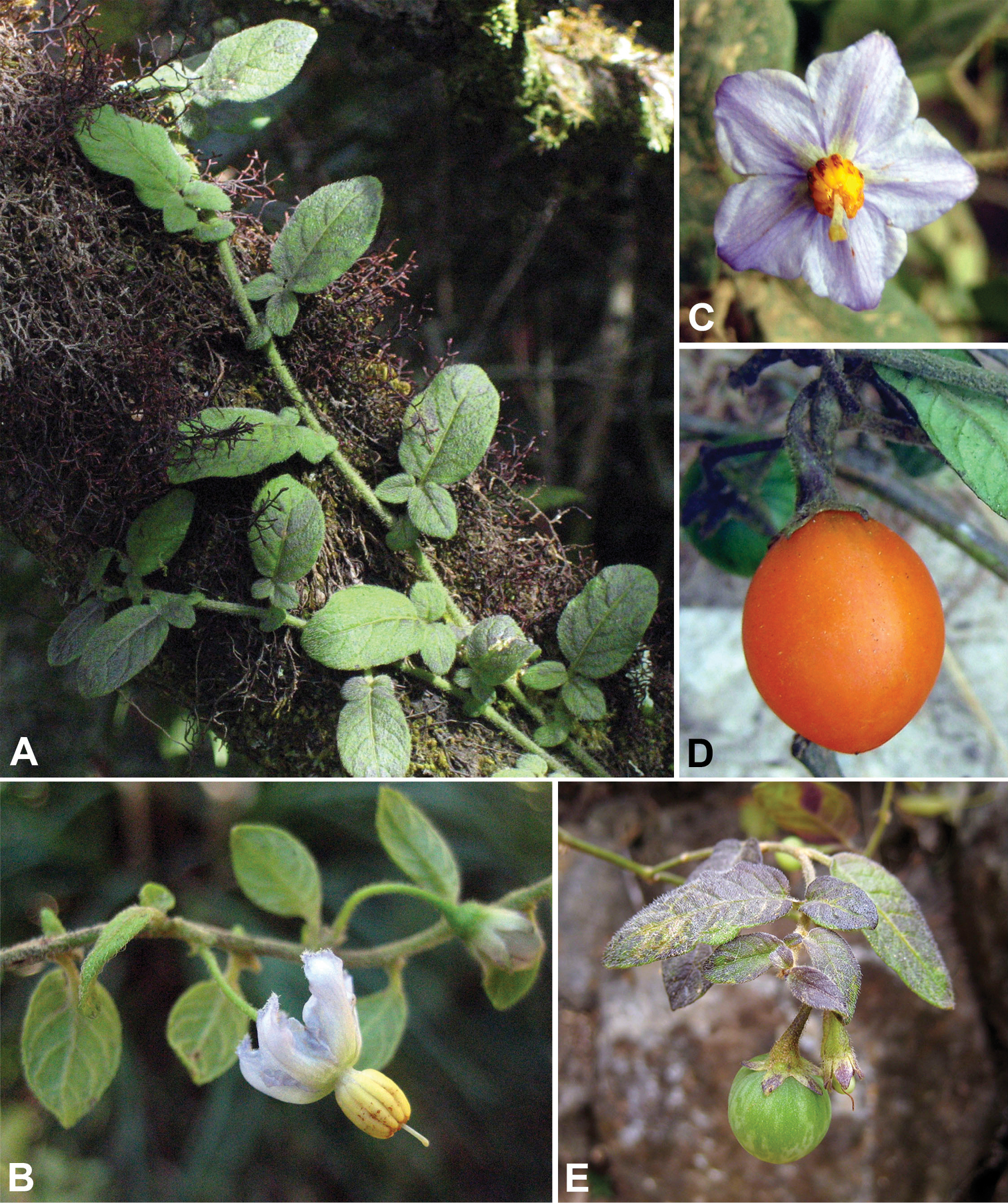
Solanum baretiae

Commerson named many of the plants he collected after friends and acquaintances. One of them, a tall shrub with dark green leaves and white flowers that he found on Madagascar, he named Baretia bonafidia. But Commerson's name for this genus did not survive, as it had already been named by the time his reports reached Paris; it is currently known as Turraea. While over seventy species are named in honor of Commerson, very few, such as Polyscias baretiana, Solanum baretiae, and Acalypha baretiae honor Baret. In December 2023, Martín E. Timaná published a description of Baretia lanata, a species in the new genus Baretia in the Caryophyllaceae family of flowering plants, named in honor of Baret. As of December 2024, the name is considered unplaced.

The New York Botanical Garden includes a plant specimen, attributed to Commerson but believed to be collected by Baret with him, in their herbarium.

Jeanne Baret is referred to in Amitav Ghosh's 2008 novel Sea of Poppies: The fictional character Paulette Lambert identifies "Philippe and Jeanne Commerson" as her "grand-uncle and grand-aunt".

In 2018, the International Astronomical Union named a mountain range on Pluto for her.

For many years, Bougainville's published journal – a popular bestseller in its day, in the original French as well as in English translations – was the only widely available source of information about Baret. More recent scholarship has uncovered additional facts and documentation about her life, but much of the new information remained little-known and inaccessible to the general public, particularly outside France. The first English-language biography of Baret, by John Dunmore, was not published until 2002, and then only in New Zealand. Other articles appeared only in scholarly journals.

The 2010 biography of Baret by Glynis Ridley, The Discovery of Jeanne Baret, brought Baret to the attention of a wider audience and helped to overturn some of the old misconceptions about her life. However, Ridley's biography has also been highly criticized by some reviewers for its reliance on improbable chains of speculation that are not corroborated by any other primary or secondary sources. New research by French researchers has provided clearer archival information on Jeanne Baret's life, as has a new biography by Danielle Clode, In Search of the Woman who Sailed the World, published in 2020. On 27 July 2020, Google celebrated her 280th birthday with a Google Doodle.

Jeanne Barret was one of the 10 inspirational French women celebrated as golden statues rising out of the River Seine during the opening ceremony of the 2024 Summer Olympics in Paris.

In 2026, Baret was announced as one of 72 historical women in STEM whose names have been proposed to be added to the 72 men already celebrated on the Eiffel Tower. The plan was announced by the Mayor of Paris, Anne Hidalgo following the recommendations of a committee led by Isabelle Vauglin of Femmes et Sciences and Jean-François Martins, representing the operating company which runs the Eiffel Tower.

== Sources ==
- Clode, Danielle (29 September 2020). In Search of the Woman Who Sailed the World. Pan Macmillan Australia Pty, Limited. ISBN 978-1-76078-495-9.
- Dunmore, John (2002). Monsieur Baret: First Woman Around the World, 1766-68. Heritage Press. ISBN 978-0-908708-54-3.
- Dussourd, Henriette (1987). Jeanne Baret (1740-1816) : première femme autour du monde [Jeanne Baret (1740–1816): first woman around the world] (in French). Moulins: Imprimerie Pottier. OCLC 25099812.
- Gelbart, Nina Rattner (2021). Minerva’s French Sisters: Women of Science in Enlightenment France. Yale University Press. ISBN 978-0-300-25256-9.
- Ridley, Glynis (2010). The Discovery of Jeanne Baret: A Story of Science, the High Seas, and the First Woman to Circumnavigate the Globe. Crown Publishers. ISBN 978-0-307-46352-4.
- Miquel, Sophie; Maguet, Nicolle (2020). "Du nouveau sur Jeanne Barret aux Archives nationales de l'île Maurice" (PDF). Bulletin de la Société historique et archéologique du Périgord. 147: 191–208.
