= Voyager Terra =

Region on the dwarf planet Pluto

- Feature type: Terra
- Location: Pluto
- Discoverer: New Horizons
- Naming: Voyager program

Voyager Terra is a region on the dwarf planet Pluto, north of Viking Terra and Tombaugh Regio and west of Pioneer Terra, which was discovered in July 2015 by the New Horizons spacecraft. It is named for the Voyager program and Voyager 2, the first spacecraft to explore Uranus and Neptune and to cross into interstellar space. On 7 September 2017, the name Voyager Terra was officially approved together with the names of Tombaugh Regio and twelve other nearby surface features.
