= Hayabusa Terra =

Region on Pluto

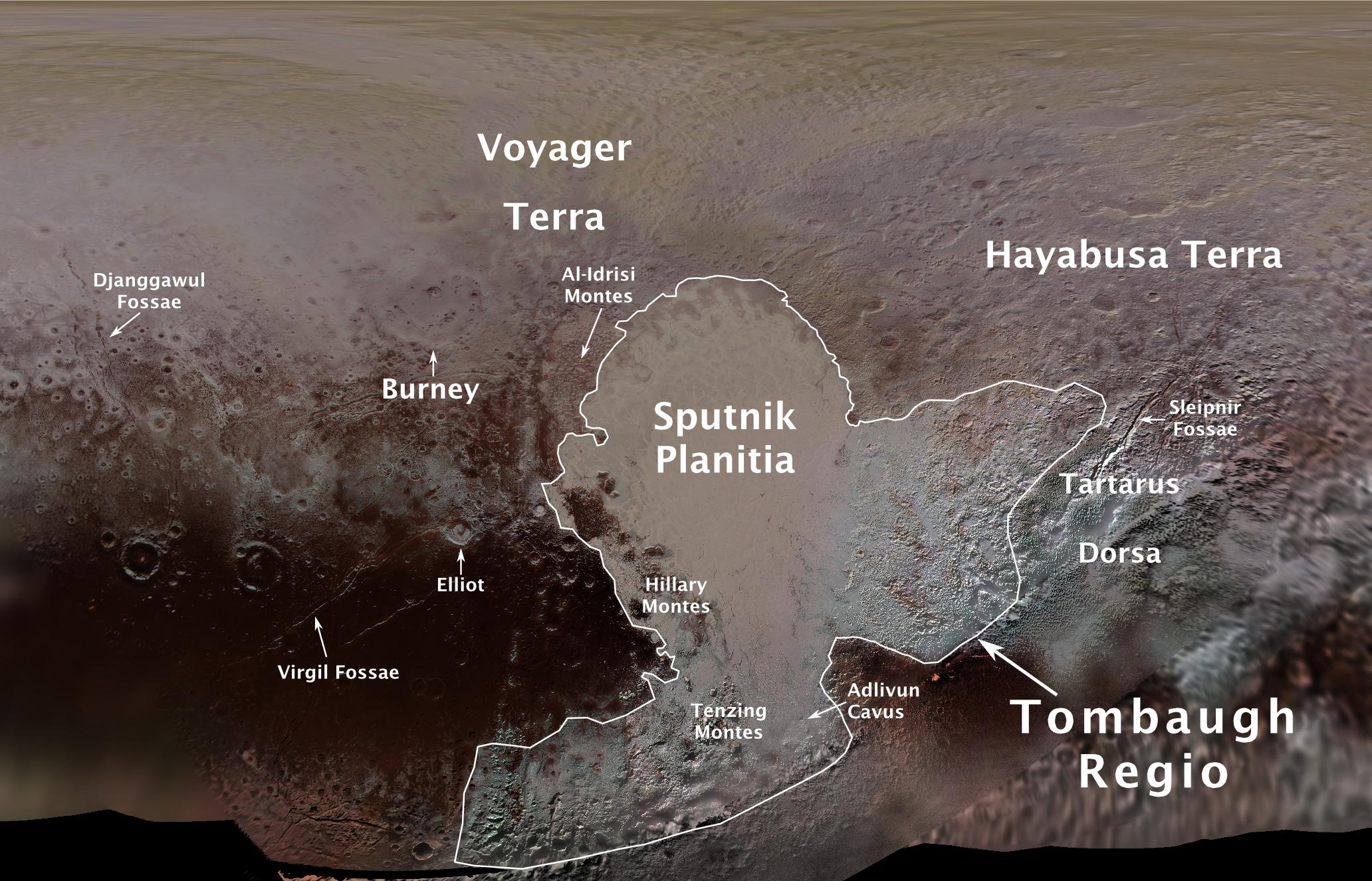
- Feature type: Region
- Location: Pluto
- Coordinates: 53°N 120°W
- Discoverer: New Horizons
- Naming: Hayabusa

Hayabusa Terra /ˌhaɪəˈbuːsə/ is a surface feature on the dwarf planet Pluto. It was discovered by the New Horizons spacecraft in July 2015. It is named for Hayabusa, the first spacecraft to successfully return a sample of an asteroid to Earth. The name has been officially approved by the International Astronomical Union on 7 September 2017.
