= Macula (planetary geology) =

Unusually dark area on the surface of a planet or moon

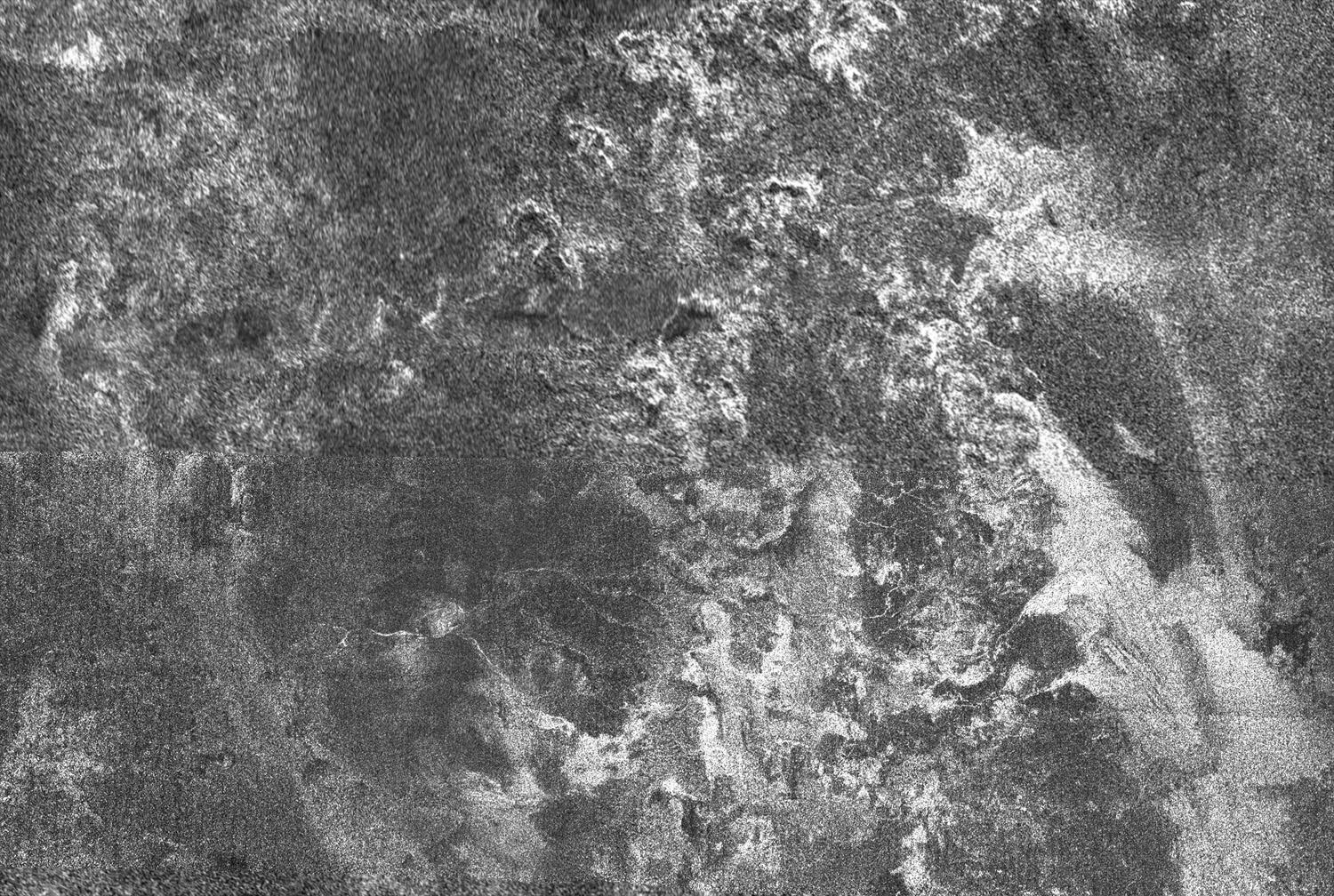
The Ganesa Macula on Titan is the large circular spot in the lower left of this image which was thought to be an ice volcano.

Macula /ˈmækjʊlə/ (pl. maculae /ˈmækjʊliː/) is the Latin word for 'spot'. It is used in planetary nomenclature to refer to unusually dark areas on the surface of a planet or moon. They are seen on the icy surfaces of Pluto, Jupiter's moon Europa, Saturn's moon Titan, Neptune's moon Triton, and Pluto's moon Charon. The term was adopted for planetary nomenclature when high resolution pictures of Europa revealed unusual new surface features.

== Links ==
- Lists of named maculae: on Europa, on Titan, on Triton
