= Lemukutan Island =

Island in West Kalimantan, Indonesia

Coordinates: 0°46′00″N 108°42′27″E

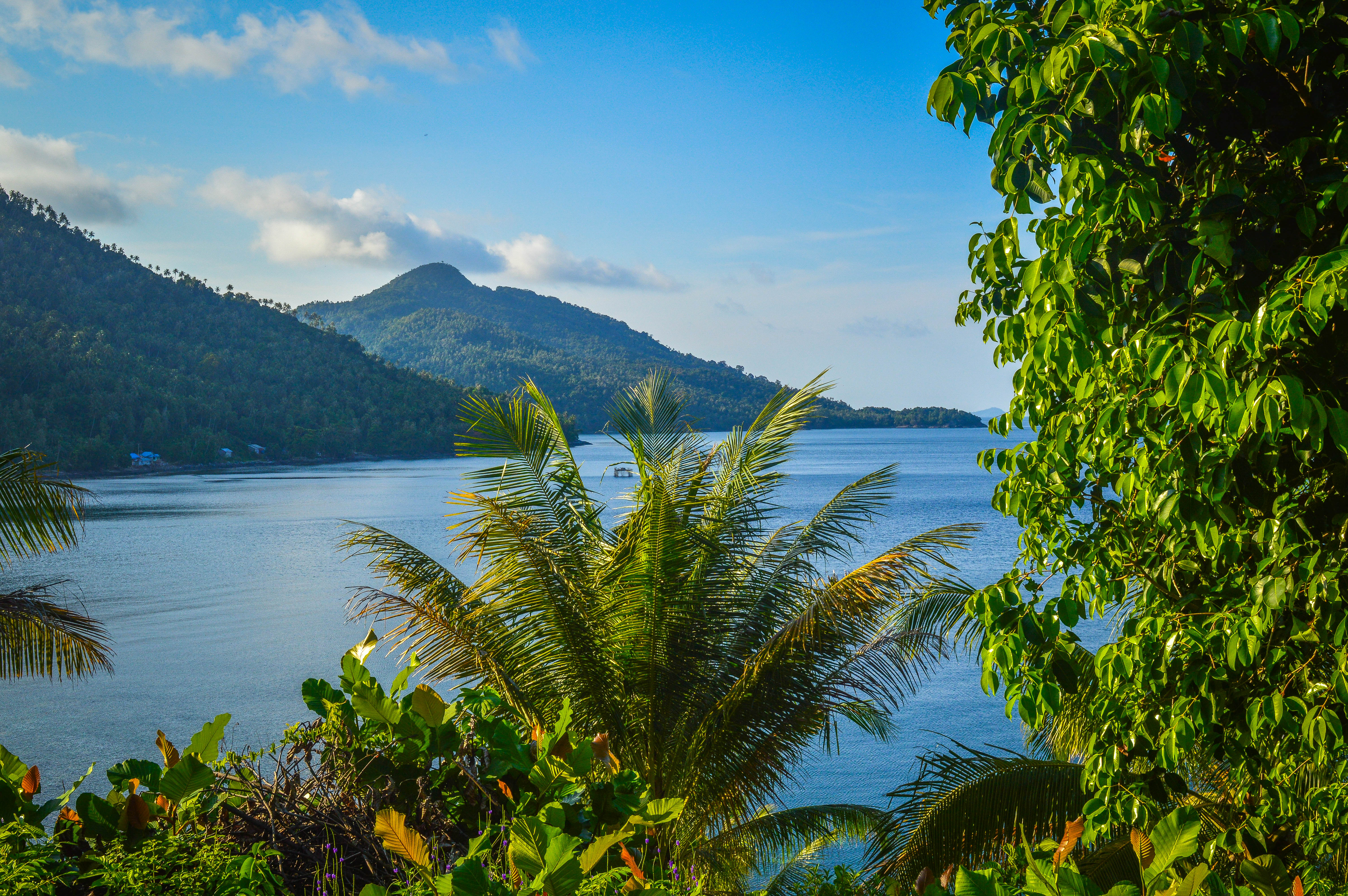

Lemukutan is an island that is administratively located in Sungai Raya Kepulauan District, Bengkayang Regency, West Kalimantan Province, Indonesia.

== Description ==
This island, located off the coast of West Kalimantan, has an area of about 14 square kilometers and an elongated shape. The land is dominated by small hills covered by dense green vegetation, creating an interesting natural landscape. The coastal area consists of rocky beaches with several areas of sand mixed with gravel, complemented by coconut trees growing in several locations. The island also has a number of small bays and capes, adding to the diversity of its coastal topography. These physical characteristics provide a unique identity for Lemukutan Island, which is surrounded by water areas with diverse coral reef ecosystems. As the largest island among with small islands nearby such as Kabung and Penatah Island, Lemukutan has an important role as a center of activity for local people who mostly work as fishermen. This island can be accessed by land travel of about 130 kilometers from Pontianak to Teluk Suak Pier, followed by a sea crossing using a fishing boat for about one hour.

Lemukutan Island is famous for its beautiful underwater world that is still preserved. The clear sea water allows observation of underwater life even from the surface, making it an ideal location for snorkeling and diving activities. The waters around the island are decorated with natural coral reefs that are home to various species of tropical fish, such as clownfish, pufferfish, and butterflyfish. Several species of turtles, such as the green turtle (Chelonia mydas), are known to often visit these waters in search of food, especially in areas filled with seagrass and algae which are their main food sources. Other marine life, such as giant clam, starfish and mollusks, are also found around the healthy coral reefs.

Lemukutan Island, with its relatively well-maintained natural conditions, requires sustainable environmental management to maintain the sustainability of its ecosystem. This management is important not only for the sustainability of marine biodiversity, but also for the community that depends on marine products as their main resource.
