= List of Equinox episodes =

A list of Equinox episodes shows the full set of editions of the defunct (July 1986 - December 2006) Channel 4 science documentary series Equinox.

== Episodes ==
=== 1986 ===
- 31 July Turbo: Once Around the Block, about British motor racing; the Ferrari F1/86 and the Imola Circuit in Emilia-Romagna in northern Italy, and Tifosi spectators; the 1984 British Grand Prix at Brands Hatch; the Motronic engine control units of Robert Bosch GmbH; Keith Duckworth, known for the Cosworth DFV, and Michael Kranefuss, head of Ford Motor Sport; Walter Hayes of Ford of Europe; Renault began turbocharged motor racing vehicles at the 1977 British Grand Prix on 16 July 1977, with the Renault RS01; Cosworth in Northampton; Beatrice Foods of the US, and Ford form an agreement in 1985, with Australian Alan Jones, with designer John Baldwin; the 1981 Italian Grand Prix and crash of John Watson; the assembled Cosworth GBA V6 engine is tested at Northampton. Produced by Patrick Uden, made by Uden Associates. Narrated by Martin Jarvis
- 7 August Turbo: Qualifying Boost, Paul Ray and electronic engineer Steve Taylor, who designed the engine management unit, at Cosworth; each year in Formula 1, the permitted fuel was reduced - for 1986, it was 195 litres; the EEC-IV electronic fuel injection system, an EPROM design; the Lola THL2 is tested at Boreham Circuit in Essex on 21 February 1986, with Patrick Tambay; Geoff Goddard, of Cosworth, who designed the overall engine; automotive engineer Neil Oatley; aerodynamicist Ross Brawn at Cranfield Institute of Technology; 4 March 1986 at Donington Park in Leicestershire; the Haas Lola team, and Cosworth development engineer Martin Walters; the Lotus 98T, of Team Lotus, with its Renault engine; the wastegate of a turbocharger compressor; the 1986 San Marino Grand Prix in northern Italy on 27 April 1986; the Chernobyl disaster had taken place the day before; Paul Ray notices that the exhaust has cracked near the turbocharger; Narrated by Martin Jarvis, produced by Patrick Uden, made by Uden Associates
- 14 August Prisoner of Consciousness, Sir Jonathan Miller looked at his research into human memory, and 48-year-old BBC musician Clive Wearing, who could not remember more than 10 seconds; Miller had made The Body in Question for the BBC in 1978, with much of the future Equinox team. Directed by John Dollar, produced by Patrick Uden, and made by Uden Associates
- 21 August A Short History of the Future: The City. Narrated by Tim Pigott-Smith, produced by Patrick Uden, directed by Sheila Hayman, made by Uden Associates
- 28 August A Short History of the Future: Spaceship, how space ships were viewed at cinema, and that the US space programme was largely started by Wernher von Braun, when making documentary programmes at Walt Disney; the American public needed to be convinced of the possibilities of space travel - as it would be publicly funded; Jesco Von Puttkamer of NASA; technology historical writer Frederick I. Ordway III; von Braun had first attempted a rocket launch in 1937, but it exploded; on 3 October 1942, his first successful rocket was the first man-made supersonic craft; there were 3,165 V-2 successful launches during the war; much 1950s popular space diagrams were drawn by Chesley Bonestell, which drew the attention of Walt Disney and producer Ward Kimball, who subsequently made the 1955 television episodes Man in Space and Man and the Moon, featuring Wernher von Braun, where von Braun demonstrated his XR-1 craft; health effects of space were demonstrated by former Luftwaffe fighter pilot and physicist Heinz Haber, later a well-known German television presenter; Star Trek: The Original Series was not popular when first shown, but was hugely popular after 1972 when it was repeated; consequently, the first space shuttle was named Enterprise, and when the shuttle was displayed in California on 17 September 1976, it was attended by the full cast of Star Trek, with the theme music also being played; Beverly Thurmond, NASA food scientist; Laura Louviere of NASA. Narrated by Tim Pigott-Smith, produced by Patrick Uden, directed by Sheila Hayman, made by Uden Associates
- 4 September The Tin Snail, about the Citroën 2CV; the 2CV was first introduced in October 1948; André Citroën saw himself as a French Henry Ford, and met American automotive industrialists in October 1931, including Henry Ford at the newly opened Ford Engineering Laboratory; the industrial historian Patrick Fridenson; Citroën lit up the Eiffel Tower in Citroën regalia, for publicity; but although André Citroën followed and admired Henry Ford, Citroën were innovative themselves, on 18 April 1934 the company launched the world's first mass-produced front-wheel drive car, the Citroën Traction Avant, when the company was narrowly avoiding bankruptcy; André Citroën died in 1935 and his company, being heavily in debt, was taken over by Édouard Michelin (brother of André Michelin); Fiat introduced its similar Fiat 500 in 1935, designed by Dante Giacosa; Ferdinand Porsche designed a new mass-produced car with rear air-cooled horizontally-opposed four-cylinder engine; France did not have such a car to Germany, so Citroën developed the Toute Petite Voiture (TPV), a proposal of Pierre Michelin - he brought in André Lefèbvre, who had designed the front-wheel-drive system of the Traction Avant and was a former aircraft engineer of Voisin, and led by Pierre-Jules Boulanger; Lefèbvre came from the aviation industry, and to save weight, made the car out of aluminium; the car had a torsion bar suspension, with eight torsion bars; Flaminio Bertoni, an Italian, was head of exterior design at Citroën, from 1932 to 1964; Carl Olsen, head of Citroën exterior design from 1982 to 1987; Alex Moulton, the Cambridge-educated mechanical engineer, who designed the suspension for the innovative Mini, in the late 1950s; Lucien Gerard, from Talbot, and Walter Becchia, who designed the two-cylinder water-cooled horizontally opposed engine. Narrated by Peter Jones, produced by Patrick Uden, directed by Jeremy Llewellyn-Jones, made by Uden Associates
- 11 September Deep Trouble, about the North Sea oil industry; the beginning of 1986 saw peak production of North Sea oil; finding new oil reserves would be from deeper oil fields, that cost more money to extract; at the same time the oil price plummeted, with over 15,000 job losses in the British oil industry by the end of 1986; Vickers Ltd entered the oil exploration industry; submersible craft were helping exploration of oil, with remotely operated craft becoming important. Narrated by Martin Jarvis, produced by Patrick Uden, directed by Paul Fabricius, made by Uden Associates
- 18 September What They Don't Tell You When They Sell You a Computer, about professionalism in the computer hardware industry; Eddy Shah from the Today newspaper, and their new unreliable computer system; Brian Wilson of First Computer believed that the computer hardware retailing industry were largely unprofessional unscrupulous cowboys; the National Computing Centre (NCC) was set up by the government in 1966, to provide advice; BP opened its own Microshop, to circumvent the cowboys, and assist with technical jargon, and connecting devices; due to warp-drive technical obsolescence in the 1980s, yesterday's computers rapidly lost all total value; Iain Callaghan, operations director of John Menzies newspaper distribution business, and how computer databases could process newsagents' daily orders much quicker and reliably; Geoff Dalby, head of data at Woolwich Equitable Building Society, which had called off a merger with the Nationwide Building Society, as their computer systems would not work together; greater computer automation of the personal finance industry could lead to much less day-to-day contact with individual customers; David Bailey of Phillips & Drew. Narrated by Miriam Margolyes, produced by Michael Blakstad, directed by Catherine Robins, made by Workhouse Productions
- 25 September Precisely in Profit, about manufacturing to exact margins. Produced by Glyn Jones, directed by Eben Wilson, made by Quanta
- 2 October Now Eat This, about snack foods. Produced by Edward Poulter, directed by Mike Tomlinson, made by London Scientific Films
- 9 October Growing up with Rockets, a personal, and underreported, view of early elementary rocketry from 1950, starting with captured German V-2 rockets; the former 1970 class of Cocoa Beach High School; failed launches would land in the Banana River; NASA was formed in July 1958, in a coherent response to the Russian launches in 1957; the President visits Cocoa Beach to celebrate the US getting a man to orbit the Earth in February 1962; the nearby Patrick Air Force Base; Syncom 3 was launched on 19 August 1964, the world's first geostationary communication satellite, on a Delta rocket; the minutes leading up to the first launch of STS-1 in April 1981. Directed and a first hand account of Nancy Yasecko, produced by Patrick Uden, made by Uden Associates
- 16 October Shock Trauma, about the Baltimore Shock Trauma Center (R Adams Cowley Shock Trauma Center). A Canadian production, produced by Patrick Uden, made by National Film Board of Canada and Uden Associates
- 23 October Drink Drive and Murder; it featured two court cases in the US, where a 33 year old killed a couple in their 20s, and a 17 year old who killed a couple of teenagers, and a Californian drink-drive reform centre; in some US states, if you kill when drunk, the charge is murder. A Canadian production, made by Uden Associates and the National Film Board of Canada
- 30 October The New Magicians, about film special effects; Gertie the Dinosaur in 1914 and The Sinking of the Lusitania in 1918; the King Kong (1933 film); the 1950s and 1960s saw modest increases in special effects, notably Forbidden Planet in 1956, until 2001: A Space Odyssey was important in 1968; another important film was Star Wars (film) in 1977, along with Close Encounters of the Third Kind, Tron in 1982 and The Last Starfighter in 1984. A Canadian production, produced by Ken McKay, made by TV Ontario
- 6 November Pioneers of the Future, about the development of microchips, such as Steve Dorsey, who invented the word processor. A Canadian production, produced by Ken McKay, made by Uden Associates and TV Ontario
- 13 November Skyscraper, about Old Madison Square Gardens and skyscrapers in Chicago and New York; Arthur Nusbaum; architect Stanley Tigerman; the tallest masonry-only building was 16 storeys high; the Great Chicago Fire in October 1871, which allowed different, and stronger, structures of building to be built instead; the 1902 Flatiron Building; architect Jack Hartray; mechanical engineer George Strakosch; the 1908 600-feet Singer Building; the 1912 800-feet Woolworth Building; the 1915 Equitable Building (Manhattan); the 1930 900-feet Chrysler Building; the 1931 1250-feet Empire State Building; mechanical engineer David Stillman; structural engineer Charles Thornton; architect Robert Sobel; structural engineer Leslie E. Robertson; civil engineer Alan Garnett Davenport of the University of Western Ontario; architect Bruce Graham; architect Harry Weese; architect Moshe Safdie. Narrated by William Woollard, produced by Nicola Glucksmann, directed by Karl Sabbagh, made by InCA

=== 1987 ===
- 17 February Freud under Analysis, historian Peter Gay; psychiatrist Joseph Wortis; the Freud Museum in north-west London; his friend Josef Breuer; his 1895 book Studies on Hysteria; psychologist Frank Sulloway; psychology writer Jeffrey Moussaieff Masson; psychiatrist Jacob Arlow; his 1905 Three Essays on the Theory of Sexuality; the Berlin Psychoanalytic Institute opened in 1920, and he had founded the Deutsche Psychoanalytische Gesellschaft; Abraham Brill; in October 1952 psychologist Hans Eysenck wrote in the Journal of Consulting and Clinical Psychology; Hungarian psychiatrist Thomas Szasz; the Yale Child Study Center; psychologist Jerome Kagan; Francis Crick disputed Freud; Freud moved to England in 1938. A US production, produced by Ben Gooder, directed by Susanne Simpson, made by WGBH and Uden Associates
- 23 July Mission to Mars, astrogeologist Harold Masursky; Carol Stoker from NASA Ames; planetary geologist Alfred McEwen; German Jesco von Puttkamer and how the space station would be ready by 1994; Gentry Lee of JPL; Jonathan Eberhart and his song about the atmosphere of Mars. Narrated by Martin Jarvis, produced by Patrick Uden, made by Uden Associates
- 30 July Playing with Fire, about the Bradford City stadium fire on Saturday 11 May 1985; it featured the Woolworths fire of 8 May 1979, in central Manchester.

Produced by Michael Blakstad, directed by Patrick Fleming, made by Workhouse Productions

- 6 August Weather Forecast about weather forecasting in the UK; Swedish Lennart Bengtsson of the European Centre for Medium-Range Weather Forecasts; Alistair Woodroffe and Brian Webster of the Met Office; numerical calculations began in the early 1950s with computers making 10,000 calculations a second but by the mid-1980s it was one billion; Meteosat-2 launched in June 1981; Steven Burke of the London Potato Futures Association; Capt Derek Ralph in a British Caledonian BAC One-Eleven flying to Aberdeen Airport; amateur weatherman Bill Foggitt; the weather centre and Lockheed C-5 Galaxy aircraft at RAF Mildenhall; conservationist Robin Page; narrated by Muriel Gray, directed by John Dollar, made by Uden Associates
- 13 August Made to Measure, essentially a re-edited, slightly updated edition of the August 1986 episodes on the F1 Ford turbocharged engine, with a few minutes of new content; in May 1987 Peter Collins watches the previous San Marino Grand Prix; Ford Cosworth V6 B187 cars: engine mapping; Dick Scammel, general head of engineering; Martin Walters, chief development engineer; the engine is dismantled, and damage is found; Geoff Goddard, chief racing engine designer; electromagnetic pulses from the engine affected the working of the engine computer circuitry; rogue signals were picked up by the engine computer, so causing erratic fuel injection; French F1 driver Patrick Tambay listens to the sound of the turbo; the turbo pressure would be limited to 2.5 in 1988, before turbos were banned for the 1989 season; the Italian Grand Prix circuit; each team is allowed two sets of qualifying tyres; the tyres on the rear axle warm up before the front axle; the Honda V6 engine could produce 1200 hp; chief designer Rory Byrne, and F1 aerodynamic forces. Narrated mostly by Martin Jarvis and partly by Eleanor Bron
- 20 August Twang, Bang, Kerang!, about the electric guitar; the Fat Tuesdays night club, and Les Paul; Glenn Wilson of the Institute of Psychiatry in London; Louis Jordan in the late 1940s; Charlie Christian developed the Gibson-ES150; Steve Howe of Yes; Burns London manufacturing guitars; Dave Russell; the body of the guitar was made of maple, a tonewood, and the fretboard of rosewood; the sound originates from the type of wood; Jerry Donohue of Fairport Convention; pickups made by Seymour Duncan; Chet Atkins; Andy Summers of The Police and Every Breath You Take; Francis Dunnery of It Bites, and Once Around the World. Narrated by John Hedges, produced by Patrick Uden, directed by Jeremy Llewellyn-Jones, made by Uden Associates
- 27 August What Goes Up..., about dismantling the AGR at Sellafield; it featured Tom Marsham CBE FRS (10 November 1923 – 12 October 1989) of UKAEA at Risley, Warrington (Birchwood Park), who was the reactor manager of Calder Hall in 1956. Narrated by Sue Jay, produced by Michael Blakstad, made by Workhouse Productions
- 3 September Hole in the Sky, about the depletion of the ozone layer, with Sir Bob Watson at NASA; the NERC's British Antarctic Survey had been measuring ozone levels since 1957 at the Halley Research Station, and a team led by Joe Farman noticed a hole in the layer; NASA had not noticed an ozone hole on its Nimbus 7 satellite, although the satellite had picked up all of the data, as Richard Stolarski of the Goddard Space Flight Center found; the ozone hole was caused by the polar vortex over the winter, where air movements outside of Antarctica are trapped, and there is not enough light to form new ozone; some people believed that the 1982 Mexican El Chichón volcanic eruption was to blame; in 1974 F. Sherwood Rowland and Mario Molina of the University of California, Irvine found that some chlorine compounds would destroy ozone by making chlorine monoxide, and both received the 1995 Nobel Prize in Chemistry for this discovery; the Chemical Manufacturers' Association (since 2000 the American Chemistry Council) and the National Science Foundation launched a new atmospheric survey at McMurdo Station, led by Susan Solomon of the Earth System Research Laboratories; Jerry D. Mahlman of the Geophysical Fluid Dynamics Laboratory at Princeton was attempting a computer model of the Antarctic atmosphere; Rafe Pomerance of the World Resources Institute; the greenhouse effect, described by James Hansen of the Goddard Institute for Space Studies, who claimed that the Earth's temperature would be 2 degrees higher by 2000, 3 degrees higher by 2010, and 4 to 7 degrees warmer by 2030; Richard E. Benedick. Directed by Linda Harrar, produced by Paula Apsell, made by WGBH, Uden Associates, Television Trust for the Environment and Sveriges Television. Originally a Nova documentary
- 24 September Dirty Money, about whether the environment can be cleaned up; the UK's first anti-pollution trade fair in March 1987, attended by William Waldegrave; Father Jim Conlon and Portglenone Abbey in N Ireland, with an anaerobic digester, which saved £1000 a month in gas cost, and the manure was sold for £25,000 a year; Mike Flux of ICI; biologist Paul Johnston of Greenpeace, in Teesside; the River Tees was the second-most polluted in the UK, with Douglas Ord of Northumbrian Water; Ken Murphy, and how Greenpeace attempted to block an effluent pipe near Immingham in March 1985; John Elkington, environmental writer; BioTechnica of Llanishen in Cardiff, reclaiming contaminated land on a former highly polluted gasworks site in Lancashire; Jutta Ditfurth; Hans-Georg Peine of BASF AG, and the Sandoz chemical spill in November 1986 in Switzerland; in 1983, ICI founded the first bioplastic company, called Marlborough Biopolymers, which made polyhydroxy butyrate; Dame Anita Roddick of The Body Shop, who worked with Friends of the Earth; Peter Baylis of the NERC Environmental Satellite Laboratory, which began in 1975, in the University of Dundee's Ewing Building, and largely provided the only UK archive of satellite environmental data. Narrated by Bob Peck, produced by Edward Poulter, directed by David Sharp, made by London Scientific Films
- 1 October Malltime. A US production, produced by Mike Wallington, made by George Haggerty, made by Kai Productions
- 8 October Anything You Can Do..., about new robotics; the five houses puzzle; Richard Gregory, professor of neuropsychology at the University of Bristol; Roger Mathias of Plessey Radar and the Multi-function Electronically Scanned Adaptive Radar (MESAR), began in 1982; Henry Thompson and speech recognition at the School of Informatics, University of Edinburgh; Robert Kowalski of the Department of Computing, Imperial College London; Margaret Boden of the University of Sussex; J. Michael Brady; Paul Caplin and robotics; Roy Bottomley of Meiko Scientific, and the transputer, developed in the UK; Plessey Laboratories at the Allen Clark Research Centre, and new chemical compounds for computer chip; logic programming and heuristics; the European Eureka Prometheus Project, an expert system. Narrated by Miriam Margolyes, produced by Michael Blakstad, directed by Catherine Robins, made by Workhouse Productions
- 22 October Command and Control, the chain of command of nuclear weapons; it featured the Air Force Research Laboratory. Directed by Clive Syddall, made by Twenty Twenty Vision
- 5 November Earthquake Country, about the San Andreas fault; Robert Wallace, chief scientist of the USGS; the 1906 earthquake caused the tectonic planes to move around seven metres; geologist Grove Karl Gilbert; an earthquake in the middle section of the fault was expected for around 1988; a 5.8 earthquake on 8 June 1934; geologist Kerry Sieh and paleoseismology; if an earthquake took place, coordination would be from the Joint Forces Training Base - Los Alamitos; earthquake engineer George W. Housner of Caltech; structural engineer Ray William Clough; earthquake engineer Luis Estava Maraboto of the Engineering Institute of the National Autonomous University of Mexico. Produced by Arabella Woods, directed by John Tchalenko, made by Red Rooster Films
- 12 November Nature's Technology, about the different types and the modelling of animal locomotion, and legged robots; robotic hands and bioengineer Stephen Jacobsen of the University of Utah; snake-arm robots; the 1986 Adaptive Suspension Vehicle (ASV) of Ohio State University, a hexapod robot, and Vincent Vohnout; active balance and Marc Raibert; the 1965 Walking Truck of General Electric; static stability and the Odex 1 six-legged robot; biomechanics and Robert McNeill Alexander, Professor of Zoology; WABOT-2 of Waseda University, optical music recognition and the NHK Symphony Orchestra of Japan conducted by Yuzo Toyama. Narrated by Adrienne Posta, directed by David Barlow, produced by Karl Sabbagh, made by InCA
- 19 November Britain Can Make It?, about making kitchen units in the UK and in Germany; the dual system of apprenticeship in Germany; Sig Prais of the National Institute of Economic and Social Research; the Britain Can Make It exhibition, where the fitted kitchen was first introduced in the UK; the Hungarian designer George Fejer was largely responsible for introducing fitted kitchens; Wolfgang Luckhaus of Poggenpohl of Germany, which also developed the fitted kitchen; in the 1960s the Germans introduced chipboard for kitchen manufacturing, which became industry-standard, with wipe-clean melamine resin facing (MFC); Hilary Steedman of the NIESR, and how the Germans built kitchens to order, whereas British companies simply built kitchens, whether ordered or not; Heal's of London introduced German kitchens to the UK in the early 1970s, in a hausfest; the German SieMatic kitchen company; Doug Gregory started The Symphony Group in 1970 after seeing chipboard, developing flatpack kitchen units, the Germans did not make flatpack kitchens, only assembled kitchens; David Love, buying director of MFI, which was helped by the flatpack revolution, but it was all largely an imitation of German products, and was a mostly standard product range; Symphony introduced computer production control in the 1980s, which the Germans had introduced in the early 1970s - this allowed much more variation of manufacturing to order, which was the main German method; employees of Symphony were largely unskilled, but German workers were largely skilled apprentices, who had passed exams in manufacturing; nearly all of German kitchens were built to order, so needed skilled workers; Walter Siekmann, production manager of Poggenpohl; German furniture manufacture was found in East Westphalia (Ostwestfalen); the Germans believed in more thorough technical training, and sold their products all over the world, but British companies had less-thorough training, and did not sell as worldwide as the Germans. Narrated by John Woodvine, directed by David Habakkuk, made by Riverside Television
- 26 November At the Edge, about the physical limits placed upon fighter pilots when flying high G capable modern aircraft, such as the F16 and the F18. Pilots are subjected to G-LOC in the Aerospace Medicine centrifuge in San Antonio, Texas. Narrated by Ray Brooks, written, produced and directed by Chris Haws, made by InCA

=== 1988 ===
- 11 February Running to Time, about the new InterCity 225; the National Express Coaches Rapide service; the project team of the Intercity 225, with project director Mike Rollin, and Mike Newman of GEC; the 225 train had to be delivered on 14 February 1988, with an operational life of thirty years; the InterCity 125 was not intended to have been primarily developed - in a board meeting, the commercial directors were not technologically knowledgeable of trains, and asked about alternatives, to be told by an engineering director that a 125 mph diesel train could be developed in two years, so the HST began at that meeting; the British Rail APT-E prototype, powered by the Leyland 2S/350 gas turbine; in 1974 BR commissioned the APT-P, which had ten years of development, due to the active tilting suspension; the 225 train was possibly to enter service on the UK's only large electrified line, the West Coast Main Line, but the much-straighter and faster East Coast Main Line was being electrified, so BR decided to implement the 225 train on the ECML instead; Crewe railway station, which opened in 1837, and where trains were first built nearby in 1843; Steve Corfield, of Crewe Works; the unsprung mass of a train, and Cardan shafts; Roger Ford of Modern Railways; John Prideaux, director of InterCity; David Carter of DCA in Warwick, who designed the livery; the Modernisation Plan was published in December 1954, which had advocated the electrification of the ECML, and the phasing-out of steam travel; the late-1980s ECML electrification had cost BR £350m - it was not government-funded, with 2,800 miles of copper wire, and 33,000 support masts, overseen by Don Heath; all of the improvements in the UK were on old lines of track, but France and Germany had built entire new electrified lines - the TGV was planned from the mid-1960s; G. Freeman Allen of Jane's World Railways; the 225 train underframe being built at Crewe Works; GEC Traction at Preston, Lancashire, Al Reed, the separately excited (Armature Controlled DC Motor) brushed DC electric motor, and Gerald West; the right-angle gearboxes were built by David Brown Ltd and Voith of Heidenheim an der Brenz in southern Germany; Eric Black of Metro-Cammell in Washwood Heath; the ST41 bogies were made by SIG Combibloc Group of Neuhausen am Rheinfall in Switzerland. Narrated by Robin Ellis, produced by Patrick Uden, directed by Paul Fabricius, made by Uden Associates.
- 12 February Playing with Fire
- 17 July The Air Fix!, about aviation safety; a television adaptation of a black comedy theatre production by 35-year-old James Castle, dressed as an airline pilot, largely featuring Turkish Airlines Flight 981, the Ermenonville air disaster, in France on 3 March 1974, to this day the worst airliner crash, without any survivors, with 177 British people killed, when a cargo door ruptured, and the subsequent enquiry led to a cover up by the airline and aviation authority; the DC10 had known design failings in its fuselage, and its cargo door design was known to be faulty by the aircraft manufacturer; the American Airlines Flight 96 crash had happened on 12 June 1972, involving a design failure of the cargo door, but the FAA nonetheless gave the DC-10 a certificate of airworthiness; the DC10 had been rushed into service; James Castle accused the aircraft industry of callous negligence; James Castle had been a British Airways aircraft maintenance technician from 1969 to 1977 at Heathrow Airport; he listed the numbers of children that lost one or both parents in the crash, and the numbers of women who were widowed; the theatre production had been going since December 1986, directed by Caroline Noh Narrated by James Castle, produced by Ben Gooder, made by Uden Associates
- 24 July Nic's Boat, about Nic Bailey, a 37-year-old architect with Foster and Partners; he designed a 40-ft trimaran, called MTC, for the Carlsberg Single-Handed Trans-Atlantic Race on 5 June 1988; he had helped to design the 1978 Sainsbury Centre for Visual Arts in Norwich and the Renault Centre in Swindon; boat builder Spud Rowsell in Exmouth, with Phil Morrison; the hull cost £46,000, and the rigging cost £46,000; the mast and rigging were fitted at Topsham, Devon; Robin Knox-Johnston; French yacht designer Bruno Fehrenbach; he sailed the Atlantic between the Rhumb Line Route and the Great Circle Route; some yachts made the journey to Newport, Rhode Island in ten days; the yacht mast was constructed by Proctor South West. Produced by Michael Wills, directed by Bob Bee, made by Juniper Productions
- 31 July The Living Dead
- 7 August Zen and the Art of TV Manufacture, a Panasonic TV factory in South Wales; in 1933 the company founder Kōnosuke Matsushita established seven guiding commercial principles; the Fidelity TV factory in west London was given one year - 1988 - to turn its fortunes around or be closed; the factory's closure was announced to the workforce on 25 January 1988, with the site closing at the end of July 1988; Amstrad bought the Fidelity name in May 1988. Narrated by Alan Howard, directed by Patrick Uden, produced by Michael Proudfoot, made by Uden Associates
- 14 August How Good Is Soviet Science?, about the political inhibition of Soviet technology in the 1980s; in many ways the Soviet Union in 1987 was a backward and underdeveloped nation, with food queues; the Soviet system didn't respond to changes in demand - everything was planned years in advance; physicist Alexander Prokhorov, who won the Nobel Prize for Physics in 1964; Russians were proud of mathematicians Pafnuty Chebyshev and Nikolai Lobachevsky; large government centrally planned projects were compatible with the communist system, notably its space programme; by the 1970s, the Russians realised that they were some distance behind other countries, such as in disciplines of computing and genetics; science teaching was emphasised at Soviet schools, and English was well taught as well; after secondary schools, half went into science; theoretical science was where Soviet teaching excelled, such as at the Steklov Institute of Mathematics; Yuri Ovchinnikov wanted to improve Soviet science; in the early 1950s, the Soviet Union tried to ignore the findings of genetics, through the work of Trofim Lysenko, who claimed that genetics was anti-communist, known as Lysenkoism leading to many scientists being imprisoned and executed; in the 1960s, a set of large biological research centres were built at Pushchino; one of the most well-built research institutes was the Shemyakin Institute of Bioorganic Chemistry, for biotechnology; Stalin did not like computer science, and it was largely banned until 1958; the Soviets were always years behind in computer science; the first recognisable transistor Soviet computer was the BESM-6 in the 1960s; later computers were the ES EVM series, copied from the IBM System/360; the Akademgorodok (Academic City) in Novosibirsk; the Institute of Automation and Electrometry researched optical memory on holographic slides to and much work on lasers; collaboration between Soviet research and Soviet industry was long-winded, maybe almost impossible - the centrally planned Soviet industry could not sufficiently adapt for short-term changes, as it had to be monotonously planned years in advance, for mass production; Soviet government research was perhaps excellent nonetheless; not many Soviet scientists could travel to international conferences; dissemination of current worldwide science was limited throughout the Soviet Union, due to widespread government restrictions; Suite No. 2 in B minor, BWV 1067. Narrated by US technology historian Loren Graham, produced by Chris Durlacher, directed by Martin Smith, made by Uden Associates, NDR and WGBH. Shown on Nova on 17 November 1987 and 22 March 1988
- 21 August Toys for the Boys, about the Williams racing team; Graham Hill and Jim Clark in 1967; Tomorrow's World in 1967, narrated by Derek Cooper; journalist Peter Windsor of Williams; aerodynamicist Frank Dernie, head of research at Williams; Keith Botsford, motor racing editor of the Sunday Times; the German racing manager Alfred Neubauer, in the late 1930s; there were 18 F1 teams, with 7 being British; Mobil Oil paid Williams £2.5m for advertising on the cars of Nigel Mansell and Riccardo Patrese; the Williams FW11; racing driver Howden Ganley; part of a BBC Horizon documentary broadcast on 9 March 1981, featuring the Williams FW07, and likewise narrated by Martin Jarvis and produced by Patrick Uden; engineering director Sir Patrick Head; Bach Mass in B minor; Mike Hawthorn, was killed on a public road, the A3 Guildford bypass, in his Jaguar Mark 1 on 22 January 1959; Canadian Gilles Villeneuve was thrown from his Ferrari, when qualifying for the 1982 Belgian Grand Prix; Swedish Ronnie Peterson, died after an accident on the start line at the 1978 Italian Grand Prix; Italian Elio de Angelis was killed in May 1986 at the Circuit Paul Ricard in south-east France; British Piers Courage burned to death at the 1970 Dutch Grand Prix; Jim Clark hit a tree on 7 April 1968 at the 1968 Deutschland Trophäe in the north-west of Baden-Württemberg; German Jochen Rindt was killed at the 1970 Italian Grand Prix after winning the championship in the same year, which was awarded posthumously; Bach Mass in B minor; Frank Williams had a crash on 8 March 1986 in the south of France, with Peter Windsor, in a Ford Sierra, making him quadraplegic; the Williams wind tunnel; Alan Jones waving the British flag at the 1980 Grand Prix; the 1988 season Williams car had a Judd V8 engine; the closing fanfare of Les préludes by Liszt; the documentary ends with German military march Prussia's Glory. Narrated by Martin Jarvis, produced by Patrick Uden, made by Uden Associates
- 28 August Cold Spring, Morning Sun, about atomic physicist Joan Hinton and her husband Erwin Engst. Joan's mother was teacher Carmelita Hinton. Joan worked on the top secret Manhattan Project at Los Alamos in 1944 which produced the atomic bombs that were dropped on Hiroshima and Hagasaki in the summer of 1945. After the war, Joan, her brother Bill, and her husband Erwin (Sid) Engst travelled to China to join Mao Ze Dong and the cultural revolution. Over the next five decades, Joan and Sid became pioneers in Chinese agricultural science and technology. Narrated by Liza Goddard, written, produced and directed by Chris Haws, Made by InCA.
- 18 September Taking the Tunnel, who would be travelling through the Channel Tunnel; the tunnel would open in May 1993; Colin Kirkland, technical director of Eurotunnel; Roger Vickerman of the University of Kent; historian Corelli Barnett, and how France and Germany spent money after the war improving rail infrastructure; journalist Kathy Watson; a working model was built of the two Channel rail terminals; 90% of the tunnel went through chalk; the French end was built much more water-tight than the English end, due to the worse geology; the tunnel was around one mile long at the English end, to meet the French side in 1990; the Single Market would stop duty free sales on the Channel ferries; the former Night Ferry across the Channel, which operated until 30 October 1980; TGV Est would connect Bordeaux, and TGV Nord would connect to Germany, the Netherlands, with a spur to the new tunnel; Richard D. North; tolls on the autoroutes discouraged local traffic, which slowed down British motorways; Daniel Ghouzi of Transmanche; Martin Simmons of Kent County Council; A292 junction of M20; Corelli Barnett believed that the British civil service was best at fudging, whereas the French civil service had been trained differently at the French grandes ecoles; a VTG ship from Dover to Dieppe carried trains; freight journeys over 250 miles were most cost effective by rail, but did lack logistical flexibility at either end; Michael Barclay of Tiphook Rail; a distribution centre in Paddock Wood in Kent, built by the Spanish Transfesa; UIC gauge was the main European gauge for freight; Artura Boix of Transfesa; Richard Hope of Railway Gazette; British trains had a 25 tonne axle weight, more than the European 22 tonnes; early plans for the new Eurostar trains, which would be dual voltage for travelling in England and France; rail writer Geoffrey Freeman Allen; the French trains would leave from the Gard du Nord; customs checks would be at the British end in London, but not in France; British Rail planned a high speed line across Kent to open in 1998 from King's Cross, but it would not open until September 2003, and to London in November 2007; Roger Ford of Modern Railways. Narrated by Geoffrey Palmer, produced by Patrick Uden, directed by Paul Fabricius, made by Uden Associates
- 25 September Road Test about road transport in the UK; there were two million vehicles in the UK in 1930; a test drive would be conducted from The Point, Milton Keynes at 8.30am to Maidstone, by different routes - Mike McDonald of the University of Southampton and Margaret Bell of the University of Nottingham in a Volvo 850 would go across London, and Peter Bonsall and Howard Kirby of the University of Leeds in a Volkswagen Passat B3, would follow the M25 to the north of London, George Hazel of Napier College and John Wootten in a Ford Granada would follow the M25 south of London, and Martin J. H. Mogridge would take the train on the new Thameslink from Bedford railway station via Blackfriars Railway Bridge; the test would be directed from the Road Traffic Research Centre at Middlesex Polytechnic, with Chris Wright, Peter Hills from Newcastle University, and psychologist Ivan Brown from the Applied Psychology Unit (MRC Cognition and Brain Sciences Unit) in Cambridge; variable-message signs (VMS) on the M6; before joining the M25, the vehicles had an average speed of 50 mph; the early plans in the 1940s for the M25, which the M25 to the south and west of London, now largely follows; when the M25 needed to be built, in the 1960s, many environmental objections had arisen for it to be built; Russ Kane in Capital Radio's Flying Eye; David Marsh at the AA Roadwatch studio in north London; the ramp meter, installed on the M6 by John Wootten; all of London's traffic lights were controlled from a computer centre in Westminster, with software (Split Cycle Offset Optimisation Technique) developed by Dennis Robertson; the Volvo 850 enters London along the Edgware Road and Park Lane to Hyde Park Corner; the prototype Autoguide system invented by Ian Catling; automatic vehicle identification (AVI) and piezoelectric strips developed at the University of Nottingham Department of Civil Engineering, and tested by Peter Davies on the Nottingham ring road, next to the QMC; the Volkswagen Passat arrives first at the Great Danes Hotel, making the 107 miles in two hours seventeen minutes, an average speed of 47 mph; the route south of London - 119 miles, also has a 47 mph average speed; the 96-mile rail journey had an average speed of 35 mph; the programme content would be copied by Top Gear fifteen years later. Narrated by Martin Jarvis, produced by David Sharp, directed by Mike Tomlinson, made by Orlando Productions
- 9 October Look, No Hands! about technology outpacing human knowledge; Hubert Dreyfus of University of California, Berkeley; Martin Corbett, industrial psychologist at the University of Warwick; work by Mike Cooley, and systems design; mechanical engineer Frederick Winslow Taylor and his meticulous improvements to industrial methods, in his book The Principles of Scientific Management; John Harris, manager of the Rolls-Royce helicopter engine plant at Leavesden, Hertfordshire; perhaps automation in engineering manufacturing processes could perhaps add or enhance, rather than totally replace, which required and produced less directly competent workers. Produced by Debra Hauer, directed by Christopher Rawlence, made by Hauer Rawlence Productions
- 16 October Spytech, John Pike of the Federation of American Scientists and how the Space Shuttle was built mostly for low Earth orbit reconnaissance satellites; but the Titan 34D was also available for many spy satellite launches; Christopher Andrew of the University of Cambridge; Harry Rositzke of the CIA, and the disastrous Operation Red Sox, from 1949 to 1953; William Colby, Director from 1973 to 1976 of the CIA, and how spying methods that worked in Germany during World War II were simply hopeless in a possibly more bizarre culture of communist eastern Europe in the early 1950s, so Ferret missions by B-29 aircraft over the border were attempted instead, but many were shot down; the Americans decided to go for high-altitude reconnaissance; on 1 May 1960, an aircraft photographing a missile construction factory, pilot was sentenced to 10 years, but released after two years in exchange for Rudolf Abel; H. Keith Melton and notorious improvised technology of the KGB; the Russian defector Stanislav Levchenko; the burst transmission method; camera lenses for spy satellites made by Itek; the Space Shuttle was built to maintain and repair the Key Hole set of spy satellites, such as KH-11 KENNEN, launched by the National Reconnaissance Office (NRO) in 1976, and introduced digital photography, and EOSAT and its Landsat program; Jeffrey T. Richelson, a writer on national security; Major-General George Keegan of the Twenty-Fifth Air Force described how the Soviet Union got to know when spy satellites would be overhead, and would hide anything sensitive; listening satellites sent their data to the NSA at Fort Meade in Maryland, such as data from Magnum, launched by the secret STS-51-C mission in January 1985; Paul Bracken and all-source intelligence fusion; Soviet intelligence in the US was quite widespread, with up to 800 spies operating out of Soviet trade missions, and operated much more widespread than the US had attempted; the new KH-12 satellite, that launched in November 1992, could see through clouds. Narrated by Mike Short, produced by Claudia Milne, made by Twenty Twenty
- 23 October Bamboo, the importance of bamboo to the Chinese economy; Prof Hsiung Wenyue of the Bamboo Research Centre of Nanjing Forestry University; bamboo structures do not collapse in high winds; over a thousand species of bamboo; bamboo dies out for ten years, then grows again; only 15% of China can be cultivated; bamboo can grow four feet in 24 hours, it is the fastest growing plant; bamboo has a tensile strength twice as much as timber; hospitals in China worked with herbal remedies; bamboo traders had quotas set by the Chinese government; bamboo shoots were mostly exported to Japan; growing bamboo helped soil structure; the Chinese government encouraged the growing of bamboo, as an alternative to timber. Narrated by Jenny Agutter, produced by Michael Blakstad, directed by Patrick Fleming, made by Workhouse Productions, made in cooperation with China Central Television
- 30 October Heavy Metal, chemist Neil Ward of the University of Surrey, who found abnormal pregnancies; medical doctor Robin Russell-Jones of the Campaign for Lead Free Air; environmental chemist Brian Davies of the University of Bradford; footage from the 1971 BBC A Public Poison, with chemist Derek Bryce-Smith, and Patrick Lawther of St Bartholomew's Hospital; Gloria all'Egitto from Aida by Giuseppe Verdi, with the assembly line of the Rover 800; Robin Brundle; Eric Fountain of Vauxhall Motors; Ojos Criollos by Louis Moreau Gottschalk. Narrated by Catherine Robins, produced by Michael Blakstad, made by Workhouse Productions
- 13 November Free Flight, about gliding, with Derek Piggott in a Rolladen-Schneider LS4 at Booker Gliding Centre in Buckinghamshire; in the UK there were about 350,000 flights and 2 deaths each year; a Schleicher ASW 24 in a wind tunnel with Loek Boermans at TU Delft Faculty of Aerospace Engineering in the Netherlands; the Schleicher ASH 25 with glider pilot John Jeffries at London Gliding Club west of Dunstable; at Wasserkuppe, a 3,000 ft mountain in the east of Hesse in the centre of Germany is where gliding mostly developed in the 1920s by the Deutsche Forschungsanstalt für Segelflug, due to German powered-aircraft manufacturing being legally restricted; nearby at Poppenhausen, Hesse is Alexander Schleicher GmbH & Co, with designer Gerhard Waibel, where gliders had wings made from carbon fibre, and covered in kevlar for torsional stiffness; the first glider of a contemporary design was the Akaflieg Stuttgart fs24 in 1951. Narrated by Robert Gary
- 20 November Chaos, Tim Palmer of the ECMWF; mathematician Robert L. Devaney; German mathematician Heinz-Otto Peitgen and fractal geometry; strange attractors in dynamical systems, such as weather systems; David Rand of the University of Warwick, and period-doubling bifurcation, discovered in 1975 by mathematician Mitchell Feigenbaum discovered; fractal landscapes; British mathematician Michael Barnsley, and affine transformations, which are applied to digital image processing; the chaos game; Soviet physicist Lev Landau; physicist Harry Swinney of the University of Texas; economist James B. Ramsey; Ian Stewart of the University of Warwick, and the unpredictable rotation of Hyperion. Written, produced and directed by Chris Haws, the programme was made by Independent Communications Associates (InCA). In 1989, it won the SciTech Award for best scientific documentary.
- 27 November The Art of Deception, about camouflage, deception, decoys and stealth. The Northrop Grumman B-2 Spirit was first displayed on Tuesday 22 November 1988, just five days before the programme was aired. Featured interviewees include: Richard P. Hallion of Wright-Patterson Air Force Base; Peter Varnish of the Admiralty Research Establishment at Funtington in West Sussex; defence writer Antony Preston; Roy Behrens of the Art Academy of Cincinnati; Lt Col Chris Nash of Surveillance, Target Acquisition, Night Observation and Counter-surveillance (STANOC); Major William Marshak of the AAMRL - now the 711th Human Performance Wing; Captain Brian Perowne, commanding officer of HMS Brazen (F91); aviation writer Bill Sweetman, and Commander Patrick Walker, commanding officer of HMS Trafalgar (S107) a Royal Navy hunter-killer submarine; John Hall of the Admiralty Research Establishment (former Admiralty Experiment Works) at Haslar. Narrated by Nick Chilvers, Written, produced and directed by Chris Haws, made by InCA and WGBH Boston

=== 1989 ===
- 9 July Moving Pictures, with Sir Jonathan Miller, the documentary explains how the brain sees images, with relation to television; Gotthold Ephraim Lessing and his work Laocoön; animator Sergio Simonetti; the National Science and Media Museum in Bradford; the Asteroid theme of Pearl & Dean; cognitive scientist Jerome Lettvin; John Grover and the 1989 film Licence to Kill; with the documentary editor Simon Rose. Produced by Patrick Uden, directed by Michael Proudfoot, made by Uden Associates
- 23 July The Bicycle: The Green Machine, Columbus of Italy that made cycle steel tubing from 130 kg steel billets; Cinelli of Milan; sports scientist Adrienne Hardman of Loughborough University; cycle chains were mostly made in Japan; 2m would be sold in UK - 700k by Raleigh. Narrated by the Radio 4 newsreader John Hedges, produced by Jeremy Llewellyn-Jones, made by Chrysalis Television
- 30 July Earth Calling Basingstoke, about Guy Hurst, who collates sightings for The Astronomer (BAA); Dave Graham from Brompton-on-Swale; John Wall, known for his Crayford focuser; the documentary was filmed around April 1989, and the astronomers in County Durham saw the effects of the March 1989 geomagnetic storm. Produced by Patrick Uden, directed by Taghi Amirani, made by Uden Associates
- 6 August New York! New York!, about sewage; New York makes enough sewage each day to fill the Yankee Stadium ten times, with seven million people; it had 80,000 miles of electric cable; a new sewage tunnel 60 miles long, 800 ft below ground, was being built, to be finished in the next century - the New York City Water Tunnel No. 3 is expected to be finished by 2032
- 13 August Fatal Attraction, about road transport; Britain subsidised rail £2 per mile, West Germany was £5 per mile; Reinhard Gutter of Cologne; traffic calming hadmainly begun in West Germany, from 1976; John Whitelegg; transport psychologist Carina van Knippenburg of the University of Gronigen; in 1987, the Dutch government introduced rationing of car transport, also trialled in Hong Kong; Ian Catling, and road pricing; Martin Paget in Birmingham; Talib Rothengatter, and the resignation of the Dutch government in April 1989; Philip Goodwin; Martin Mogridge of UCL. Narrated by Simon Ward, produced by Stewart Lansley, directed by Andy Mayer, made by Juniper Productions
- 20 August The Defender, building a new fighter plane in Canada; Chris Ball, of Bristol Aerospace in Winnipeg, and Bob Diemert are building a fighter plane in Carman, Manitoba; Bob Diemert flew one of his restored Hurricane XII aircraft in the 1969 Battle of Britain; the Commemorative Air Force at Harlingen, Texas; his plane attempts to take off, but it is something akin to a scene from Those Magnificent Men in Their Flying Machines. Produced by Charles Konowal, directed by Stephen Low, made by Uden Associates and National Film Board of Canada
- 27 August Little by Little, about Eric Drexler and nanotechnology. Produced by David Kennard, directed by Karl Sabbagh, made by InCA
- 3 September Woomera, a rocket base for over 30 years; set up by Sir John Events; rockets arrived in 1949, and the Australian Security Intelligence Organisation (ASIO) needed to be set up as sensitive information had leaked to the Soviets; the Weapons Research Establishment was set up at Edinburgh, South Australia, which is now largely RAAF Base Edinburgh; the GAF Jindivik target drone was developed in 1952; up to 6 or 7 guided missiles would be launched per day; the Malkara and Stanley Schatzel (1924-2015), technical director from 1970 to 1989 for Hawker Siddeley Dynamics; the drop of the Blue Danube by No. 49 Squadron RAF in October 1956 in Operation Buffalo at Maralinga; Project Dazzle and its research on re-entry vehicles enabled the Mercury-Atlas 6 launch to happen in February 1962; the Australian government built four launch pads for the Blue Streak in 1959, but it was cancelled in 1960, the redesignated satellite launcher Blue Streak first launched on 5 June 1964, and satellites would be launched by 1966, but only WRESAT was launched in November 1967, on a Redstone rocket instead; Woomera launched over 4000 missiles and cost the Australian government £900m; the site was demolished by the Australian government at the end of the 1960s; part of the former site is now the secret Joint Defense Facility Nurrungar
- 17 September Not in the Stars, making mathematical models for predictions; Robert May, Baron May of Oxford of Imperial College; William Phillips and his 1949 MONIAC economic model; a British Airways 747 flight simulator; computer models of epidemics - the R number, and vaccination policies; the UK fishing industry had quotas imposed in 1983, due to mathematical models of fish stocks; John Shepherd of the Centre for Environment, Fisheries and Aquaculture Science (CEFAS) laboratory in Lowestoft; computer models of warfare were developed by the Defence Operational Analysis Establishment in West Byfleet with deputy director David Faddy, which closed six years later, superseded in function by CORDA (UK); Irving Mintzer of the World Resources Institute; the NASA Goddard Space Flight Center had developed computer models of the Earth's atmosphere, such as rainfall; the hole in the Ozone layer and phytoplankton, with Norman Myers; Ian Riley of the Economist Intelligence Unit. Narrated by Bob Peck. Written, produced and directed by Chris Haws, made by InCA
- 24 September Race for the Top, CERN versus Fermilab; in 1983 CERN discovered the W and Z bosons, it and Fermilab were looking for the top quark; Leon M. Lederman, director of Fermilab; Andy Parker of CERN; CERN had 80 scientists led by Luigi Di Lella on its UA2 experiment, and Fermilab had its Collider Detector at Fermilab (CDF); Roy Schwitters; Fermilab had discovered the bottom quark in 1977; John Ellis of CERN; each team prepared for an annual physics conference at La Thuile, Aosta Valley in north-west Italy; UA2 had a meeting in July 1989 in Cambridge; the top quark would be discovered in 1995 with 175 GeV by Fermilab. Narrated by Carole Boyd, known for playing Lynda Snell in The Archers, joint production InCA and WGBH
- 1 October Walk on Wheels, a half-million disabled people have a wheelchair in the UK; NHS wheelchairs were made by Carter's; the quick-release axle was developed in World War II, for releasing munitions; the residential Treloar School in Alton, Hampshire, which was funded by individual LEAs, with charity funding as well; Bill Walmsley of the Department of Health's wheelchair research centre in Blackpool, now part of the Disability and Carers Service at DWP Peel Park at the end of the M55 motorway, on the A5230 in Westby-with-Plumptons. Narrated by John Hedges, produced by Jeremy Llewellyn-Jones, made by Chrysalis Television (North One Television)
- 8 October Invasion of the Body Scanners, a reference to the 1956 film Invasion of the Body Snatchers; X-rays were introduced in the 1890s, but it took fifty years to vastly improve the early crude techniques; CT was invented in the late 1960s - its inventor with Prince Philip, Duke of Edinburgh; Ian McDougall at a magnet technology company, who designed the first magnet, cooled with liquid helium in 1979; X-ray scans were a fairly crude process, but other types required computer image processing; Michael Boswell of GE Medical Systems; scans were taken in the coronal plane and sagittal plane; by 1989 the NHS only had four of these scanners - one was at Frenchay Hospital, made by GEC Medical (Picker International) - there were around 25 scanners in the whole UK; the Brockton Hospital; there were 1500 scanners in the US, with 39 in Massachusetts; Donald Longmore of the National Heart and Chest Hospitals, who performed the UK's first heart transplant on 3 May 1968; CT scanning had been performed for neuroradiology since the mid-1970s; radiology at Middlesex Hospital; medical ultrasound was a much safer technique than X-rays, and a new type deployed the Doppler effect, but medical ultrasound lacked cast-iron image definition; but scanners were hideously expensive, due to the convoluted enormous magnets that were required. Narrated by John Benson, produced by Mike Johnstone, directed by Ed Newstead, made by VATV (Video Arts)
- 15 October Wheels of War, about the early 1990s Leyland 4-tonne truck and defence procurement; James Adams, journalist; military historian Correlli Barnett; general service (GS) cargo vehicles, and a RE vehicle carrying a Medium Girder Bridge; a youthful-looking Mark Francois; the Austin Champ, designed in the 1950s; the British Aerospace Nimrod AEW3 was cancelled in 1986 at a cost of £860m; cost-plus contracts were replaced by competitive; Sir Peter Levine was brought in as Chief of Defence Procurement; the Leyland 4-tonne truck would replace the Bedford MK, made by Bedford Vehicles; journalist John Parsons; each vehicle would cost around £23,000 each; the Leyland 5-tonne was developed from its Comet and Roadrunner vehicles (developed into the DAF LF) under project director Stuart Hayes; the equivalent German vehicle, the MAN KAT1, had cost £75,000 each; the Panavia Tornado; Leyland design engineer Colin Ingram; the three vehicle prototypes were punishingly tested at the Royal Armament Research and Development Establishment (RARDE). Narrated by Anthony Valentine, produced by Patrick Uden made by Uden Associates
- 22 October Three Score Years and Then?
- 29 October Robotopia, advances of robotics in Japan, and bizarre contraptions; Frederik L. Schodt, author of the 1988 book Inside the Robot Kingdom - for hundreds of years until 1853, Japan was a fairly backward country; Joseph Engelberger, who developed the first industrial robot, Unimate, made by his company Unimation from 1961 - there were around 200,000 industrial robots, with around 130,000 of those in Japan; Japanese robot artist Hajime Sorayama, who drew lurid female robots; automated mannequins; nineteen universities in Japan were developing ungainly humanoid robots, notably Ichiro Kato at Waseda University; Seiuemon Inaba of FANUC, produced by Mike Wallington, made by Kai Productions
- 5 November Fly-by-wire, the new Airbus 320; software engineer Mike Hennell of the University of Liverpool; Roger Beteille, managing director of Airbus from 1967–85, and Henri Ziegler; John Knight of the University of Virginia; software engineer Bev Littlewood of City University; the A320 was the first fly-by-wire airliner; Blind Landing Experimental Unit testing at RAE Bedford in the 1960s, and developing the automatic pilot with a Vickers Valetta; testing Concorde in a wind tunnel; the Apollo project had depended on computers - it couldn't be done otherwise; Paul Ceruzzi of the Air and Space Museum; Philip Felleman of the Draper Laboratory; testing the F-16 in the early 1970s; Joe Sutter, head of Boeing from 1981–86; Boeing introduced flight management systems, so not needing a flight engineer; David Learmount of Flight International, and how Airbus had more commercial need to be innovative; the A300 was the first two-engined wide body aircraft; the A310 had electrical hydraulics and electronic control of some flight surfaces; John Cullyer of the University of Warwick; the A320 had five master computers; Gordon Corps, the Airbus test pilot, later to fly on Thai Airways International Flight 311 in 1992; Gilles Pichon, chief engineer of the A320; Jacques Troyes, head of Flight Control at Airbus; there was emergency mechanical control to the rudder and tail trim; the June 1988 Air France Flight 296Q - Michel Asseline, the pilot, said the aircraft had tried to land, when he tried to raise the aircraft; Alain Monnier of the DGAC said it was pilot error; Greg Holt of the FAA and Brian Perry of the CAA; the four-engined A330 would be manufactured from 1992; a prototype fly-by-wire relaxed stability Saab JAS 39 Gripen tumbles on 2 February 1989 at Linköping/Saab Airport, piloted by Lars Rådeström. Narrated by James Bellini, produced by Ben Shephard (historian), directed by John Longley, made by Box Television with WGBH
- 12 November Deadly Force, aerial shots of Miami; the WINZ Miami broadcaster; the Miami SWAT response team; the 1980 Miami riots; Sgt Louis Battle, Bernie Gonzalez and the Heckler & Koch MP5; Tom Salerno and the Remington Model 870 pump action shotgun, the M1911 pistol and Beretta M9; Ted Bradley; a WSVN news broadcast with Jane Akre; two thirds of Miami's population were Latin-American, and had many exiled citizens; the 1980 Mariel boatlift, from Cuba, added to the population and much to the crime; Miami had two murders a day in the 1980s; Robert Waller; Edna Buchanan of the Miami Herald; severed limbs washed up on Miami beach; the Colt Python; the Beretta 92; the Colt AR-15 semi-automatic rifle; 80% of SWAT call-outs were connected to the drug trade; two thirds of illegal drugs went through Miami; Sgt Louis Philips and negotiation techniques; SWAT negotiator Eric Caspener; 95% of SWAT negotiations work. Produced by David Jones, directed by Catherine Bailey, made by Buffalo Pictures
- 19 November Faster than a Speeding Bullet, and the quest for supersonic flight, eventually resulting in Concorde. The programme features former Concorde pilot Christopher Orlebar, who wrote The Concorde Story. The history of supersonic research dates back to the 18th Century, but supersonic flight only became achievable after the development of the jet engine. Featured aircraft include: the wartime Messerschmitt Me 262; the innovative de Havilland DH 108; the Messerschmitt Me 163 Komet; the Fairey Delta 2, the Bell X1 and numerous experimental "X Planes". After the war, the world's fastest non-experimental aircraft was the Lockheed SR-71 Blackbird, which could fly at 95,000 ft at 2,300 mph. The programme interviews key figures in the development of supersonic military aircraft and second generation SST (Supersonic Transport) aircraft. Narrated by Tony Anholt, written, produced and directed by Chris Haws, made by InCA

=== 1990 ===
- 5 August The Nuts and Bolts of Ben Bowlby, 23 year old Ben Bowlby; his sister Sophie studied costume design; his father was a photographer at the Royal Free Hospital; the first fifteen minutes would be shown as part of the November 1991 episode; monocoque structures; his child psychiatrist grandfather John Bowlby, the son of Sir Anthony Bowlby; Frank Dernie at Team Lotus in Norfolk, and automotive diffusers; circuits at Snetterton Circuit. Narrated by Martin Jarvis, directed by Patrick Uden, made by Uden Associates
- 12 August The Greenhouse Conspiracy
- 19 August Selling the Secret, about the Soviet Union selling technology; it visited the Khrunichev State Research and Production Space Center in Moscow. Produced by Paul Murricane, directed by Ross Wilson, made by Scottish Television
- 2 September Blue Skies, about British innovation and its funding; biologist Nigel R. Franks at the University of Bath, who researched social insects; chemist and innovation advocate Don Braben, and a double pendulum and deterministic chaos, he believed that progress in science research should take more daring risks, and be less cautious; computer scientist Chris Tofts; science funding often liked the predictable, and possibly the banal, and was cautious - it distinctly preferred the known to the unknown, it wanted nice and neat ready-made solutions but without associated drastic risks; Sir David Chilton Phillips claimed that science funding was not restrictive to any unconventional novel proposals; biologist Denis Noble; the British government research councils spent £800m a year; the chemist George Porter, a leading light in British innovation, and chlorine monoxide. Narrated by Peter Evans, produced by Martin Rosenbaum, directed by Jeremy Llewellyn-Jones, made by World Wide International
- 9 September Spitfire, Beethoven's 9th Symphony; Luftwaffe pilot Werner Mölders, the first pilot to shoot down one hundred aircraft; 15 August 1940 - 1,200 German fighter aircraft took off, with 1,800 bomber aircraft; Luftwaffe general Adolf Galland; not many British fighter pilots who survived the Battle of Britain would survive the war; it took a year to train a British fighter pilot, and many pilots were not officers; the Battle of Britain Memorial Flight at RAF Coningsby in Lincolnshire, with Squadron Leader Paul Day; the RAF Hawker Fury entered service in 1931 and was the first 200 mph British fighter aircraft, with a 650 hp R-R engine; R. J. Mitchell had designed an excellent seaplane for the 1931 Schneider Trophy, but the British government would not fund this excellent design - the Supermarine S.6B, leaving Lucy, Lady Houston, married to Sir Robert Houston, 1st Baronet, to fund the project entirely herself, from a request of the Royal Aero Club; the 230 mph Type 224 led to the 265 mph Type 425, with a 650 hp Goshawk engine; R-R proposed a 27-litre engine, derived from their R engine, in 1934; this new engine led R.J. Mitchell to propose the 350 mph Type 300 with the 1000 hp Merlin engine, and a £10,000 contract was offered for this aircraft to be ready by October 1935; the Hawker Hurricane was a monoplane Hawker Fury; 310 Spitfires were ordered; military historian Corelli Barnett and how later versions of the Spitfire took three times the man hours of the Bf 109; Sir Peter Masefield; 19 Squadron, led by Iliffe Cozens, converted from the Gloster Gauntlet to the Spitfire in August 1938; in the Battle of Britain, thirty Spitfires had the 20mm cannon fitted; the second movement - Fortune plango vulnera of Carmina Burana and the Messerschmitt Bf 109 at RAF Boscombe Down; Spitfire pilot Laddie Lucas; around 350 Spitfires entered US service. Narrated by John Hedges, produced by Brian Johnson, made by Uden Associates
- 23 September Trouble on the Line, with Richard Hope and Roger Ford rail journalists, Chris Green, the Head of Network SouthEast; mention of a possible Crossrail and the new Thameslink, which was a redeveloped former freight tunnel; Andrew Higton; Bob Walters the InterCity 225 project engineer; London had the biggest commuter system in world; Borough Market Junction is a bottleneck; Jim Vine head of the new Networker train project; BR carried 700 million people; 134,000 BR employees; at Department of Transport 2300 worked on the roads, and 135 on rail; Dornoch Firth Bridge (A9), shown being built, it saved twenty miles, and could have had a rail bridge too for the Far North Line. Narrated by Anthony Valentine
- 30 September Fly-by-wire: Technology on Trial
- 7 October The Light Stuff, about a human-powered aircraft from Santorini to Crete, the MIT Daedalus; the title is from The Right Stuff; the project had taken three years, to fly across the Aegean Sea; the aircraft weighed around 30 kg; to gain the Kremer prize, SUMPAC of the University of Southampton made the first human-powered flight in November 1961, followed by HMPAC Puffin, of de Havilland in Hertfordshire, in May 1962; the Bristol Jupiter flew in 1972; in 1977 Paul MacCready designed his Condor, and his Albatross flew across the English Channel on 12 June 1979, with Bryan Allen; John Langford of MIT developed the Monarch aircraft in 1983, which flew at 21 mph; the Daedalus project began in 1985, to make a 72 mile flight; Steven R. Bussolari of the MIT Lincoln Laboratory; the aerodynamicist was Mark Drela, with his XFOIL; in 1986, the team moves to Hanscom Field; the pilot Lois McCallin; after three to four hours of heavy exercise, the body's glucose is depleted; the first test aircraft had no ailerons, to save weight, resulting in a crash; a Hellenic Air Force C-130 arrives at Heraklion International Airport on 26 March 1988; three pilots train on Crete, eating around 7000 calories per day; the flight occurs on Saturday 23 April 1988, flying at around 18 knots; a gust of wind snapped the tail boom and wing on the beach. A US production, narrated by Andrew Sachs, produced by Mark Davis, made by WGBH. Shown on Nova on 22 November 1988
- 14 October Junk Mail, about direct marketing, increased by the affordability of computers, with Erik Larson. Produced by Mike Tomlinson, made by Orlando Television Productions with WGBH
- 21 October The Mind Benders, in May 1991, the Broadcasting Complaints Commission, ruled that this episode should have been broadcast under the title Open Mind; about the Hemi-Sync method; the Float Centre, in St John's Wood with Samantha O'Connor, which cost £22 an hour; Peter Fenwick and flotation tanks; the EEG Mind Mirror of Geoffrey Blundell; the voice of Robert Monroe, and a hemi-sync session in Cambridge, where 200hz is played in one ear, and 206hz in the other ear; a so-called mind gymnasium in Japan, launched in 1975; Australian psychologist Dorothy Rowe, who questioned the veracity of the methods, which could be explained through the placebo effect, which is often not an unimportant effect on health. Narrated by Peter Jones, produced by Patrick Uden, directed by Gary Burczak, made by Uden Associates. Much of the techniques demonstrated were not dissimilar to techniques advocated by the 1990s Natural Law Party
- 28 October The Winning Streak, about East German methods in women athletics; with Katrin Krabbe. Narrated by Tony Ward, produced by Mike Johnstone, directed by Nikolas L. Janis, made by Video Arts Television
- 4 November A Brush with the Greens, about environmental consumer products; the consumer products company Creightons of Billingshurst was looking at developing new products and had an environmental audit by John Elkington; deep ecology; the PA Consulting Group; the Predicasts database; the CEGB wind energy demonstration site in west Wales at Carmarthen Bay Power Station; a million tonnes of plastic packaging waste was caused in the UK each year; separating plastic waste would allow much more recycling of household plastics; the Greater Manchester Waste Disposal Authority; the Purfleet Board plant in Essex, which itself was powered by landfill gas through a Ruston Gas Turbines TB5000 CHP plant, which closed in 2004; a focus group (four women) takes place, where the product designers sit behind a two-way mirror, with new toothpaste designs placed on a mood board. Narrated by wine critic Jancis Robinson, produced by Mike Cockburn, directed by David Sharp, made by London Scientific Films
- 11 November Patently Obvious?, about acquiring patents in the UK; scenes from the 1951 The Man in the White Suit and The Dam Busters; Barry Fox of New Scientist, and the invention of FM by Edwin Howard Armstrong; Jeremy Phillips of Queen Mary and Westfield College; computer software cannot be patented; Peter Chilvers, who disputed an American patent; the British Technology Group; Richard Taylor and Paul Kellar of Quantel; in the European Patent Organisation, the UK had 6% of patents but the US and Germany had 25% each; Robert Donat in 1951 The Magic Box. Produced by Debra Bauer, directed by Chris Rawlence, made by Hayer Rawlence
- 18 November Superpowers? with Ray Hyman, about the international group of sceptics Committee for Skeptical Inquiry, who dispute topics such as UFOs; Paul Kurtz; Charles Honorton; Stanton T. Friedman and Philip J. Klass; psychologist Sue Blackmore; the Mars effect by French psychologist Michel Gauquelin, supported by psychologist Hans Eysenck; sociologist Marcello Truzzi; the Flixborough explosion in June 1974 and Lesley Castleton née Brennan from Weelsby Street, Cleethorpes, who had a premonition six hours before it took place, telling her friends at lunchtime before it had occurred; Russell Targ; physicist Robert G. Jahn and David Marks. Narrated by David Neal, executive produced by Jerome Kuehl, produced/directed by Adrian Pennink, made by Open Media
- 25 November Sex, Lies and Toupee Tape. with Neil Innes. Explores the medical conditions that result in baldness, as well as the dermatological and hormonal physiology of normal pattern balding in aging men (and women). Neil composes and performs songs to illustrate the topic, as well as acting as the guinea pig for numerous ancient and mythical remedies. The psychology and sociology of baldness is also examined, featuring wigs, toupees, ointments and surgical intervention. The programme visits the Bald Headed Men of America annual convention in Morehead North Carolina. It was written, produced and directed by Chris Haws and was an InCA production.
- 2 December The Gold Brush - Paint's Green Revolution, narrated by Gavin Weightman, produced by Michael Wills, directed by Jill Freeman, made by Juniper Productions
- 9 December Towards a Cure for Cancer, about the possibilities of hexamethylene bisacetamide (HMBA); Paul Marks and Richard Rifkind of the Memorial Sloan Kettering Cancer Center; chemist Ronald Breslow of Columbia University and HMBA; Charlotte Friend made a discovery in 1970, staining a cell with dimethyl sulfoxide (DMSO), where it made cancer cells make hemoglobin; Lorraine Baltzer, a research nurse; tretinoin was found to work in 1988, and first prescribed in September 1990; Bruce Chabner of the National Cancer Institute; differentiation therapy and Protein kinase C (PKC), signal transduction and biochemical cascades; tests on HL60 did not work; another compound was suberic bishydroxamic acid (SBHA). Narrated by Derek Cooper, directed by Karl Sabbath, made by InCA with WTTW
- 16 December School's Out, about developments in educational technology and the history of educational psychology, with cognitive psychologist Kristina Hooper Woolsey, educationalist Stephen Heppell, computer scientist Alan Kay, works such as the Beethoven's Ninth Symphony CD-ROM by Professor of Music at UCLA, Robert Winter; the Italian educator Maria Montessori; the Swiss child psychologist Jean Piaget; educational psychologist Jerome Bruner; computer scientist Seymour Papert. Narrated by Juliet Stevenson, produced by Chris Haws, made by InCA Productions
- 23 December Going Downhill Fast, with the British Olympic speed skiing team, sponsored by Nevisport; Les Arcs in April 1990; British team manager, George Brown; refrigeration engineer Malcolm Clulow of Snowmec; the Holmenkollbakken and Holmenkollen Ski Museum near Oslo; Skis Rossignol; Tento, Bratlie, Østbye and Grafitt-Voks ski wax; Norwegian chemist Leif Torgersen of Swix and SINTEF; Swix Cera wax made from perfluorooctanoic acid (C8); Scottish speed skier Robbie Brown in a wind tunnel at the Norwegian University of Science and Technology, with Helge Nørstrud; Finnish skier Kalevi Häkkinen; British speed skier Henry Iddon. Narrated by Tom Cotcher, produced by Chris Haws, directed by Andy Fairgrieve, made by InCA

=== 1991 ===
- 11 August After Desert Storm, the technology deployed in the Gulf War, and whether any lessons were learned - featured Major General Sir Peter de la Billière, Commander of the British Forces in the Gulf; a 66-foot-long F117 at King Khalid Air Base at Khamis Mushait on 16 January 1991 - the aircraft had no radar, but had the radar signature of a small bird; F117 pilot Major Greg Feest; Air Vice-Marshal Bill Written, the air commander of British Forces Middle East from November 1990; Colonel John A. Warden III, who largely planned the USAF attacks; within ten minutes of the attacks by 21 F117 aircraft on 38 targets, Iraq had lost its communications and radar; Lt-Col David Deptula; in the first wave were 4 Saudi Arabian Tornado aircraft, 4 Grumman A-6 Intruder and SEAD McDonnell Douglas F-4G Wild Weasel V aircraft, 5 Northrop Grumman EA-6B Prowler aircraft to provide electronic jamming of the Iraq airspace, and 21 McDonnell Douglas F/A-18 Hornet aircraft, each which dropped the AGM-88 HARM anti-radiation missile, to destroy the Iraq surface to air missile capability; Tomahawk missiles were fired from battleships in the Gulf and submarines in the Red Sea; the General Dynamics F-111 had around four thousand gallons of fuel; before advanced guidance systems for munitions, munitions would land according to the circular error probability, which was around a half-mile for a B-17 in World War II; the first laser-guided munitions were the Pave Tack system, which debuted on the F-111 in 1982, first deployed by F-111 aircraft from RAF Lakenheath; Duncan Lennox, editor of Jane's Strategic Weapon Systems; Theodore Postol; on one evening, twenty-eight MIM-104 Patriot missiles were launched against five ballistic missiles, which had broken up on re-entry to the earth's atmosphere - hitting any of these fractured ballistic missiles was almost impossible, due to the unforeseen changing aerodynamics; Lt-Col George Cusimano, deputy director of the USAF joint; the joint also deployed synthetic-aperture radar, to give a fuller view of ground forces, from the AN/APG-76 Doppler radar; the ground picture could be relayed to ground forces, such as in the Battle of Khafji on 29 January 1991; Royal Scots 1st Battalion, with GKN Warrior tracked armoured vehicles and Major John Potter; the experimental Ferranti TIALD laser-guided munitions were deployed by RAF Panavia Tornado aircraft to destroy Iraq hardened aircraft shelters in February 1991; 39th Regiment Royal Artillery deployed the M270 Multiple Launch Rocket System (MLRS); the land battle began on 24 February 1991, watched by the DOAE in Surrey; the land war did not last long, and on 26 February 1991 retreating Iraqi vehicles and tanks were systematically destroyed by AGM-114 Hellfire missiles, launched from undetected Boeing AH-64 Apache helicopters, resulting in total destruction; the USS Wisconsin battleship fired at Failaka Island, with surveillance provided by its AAI RQ-2 Pioneer drone. Narrated by Edward Hardwicke, directed by Chris Haws, produced by Richard Melman, made by InCA Productions
- 18 August The Healing Mind, about the field of psychoneuroimmunology; psychiatrist Janice Kielcolt-Glaser of Ohio State University College of Medicine; psychologist Barrie R. Cassileth; chemical pathologist Malcolm Carruthers takes a blood sample from a candidate, who has been driven around Brands Hatch at 115 mph; Theodore Melnechuk of the University of California; the body's immune system - the phagocytes destroy foreign bacteria, the natural killer cells destroy the body's own cells that are too damaged, and the lymphocyte T cells and B cells remember pathogens, with a corresponding antibody; experimental psychologist Robert Ader of the University of Rochester Medical Center conducted research on rats in 1975, with cyclophosphamide, which weakens the immune system, and immunologist Nicholas Cohen; prolonged secretion of endogenous opioid peptides may lower the immune function; neuroscientist David L. Felten of the University of Rochester; psychoimmunologist Nick Hall of the University of South Florida College of Medicine and an experiment with drama students, where lowering of T cells was found; Kathleen Dillon of Western New England College, where an experiment measured Ig A of candidates who watched types of television content, and found that Ig A temporarily increased with amusing content; psychiatrist Fawzy Fawzy of the University of California; psychiatrist Margaret Kemeny of UCLA. Narrated by Geoff Watts (of Radio 4's former Science Now series, produced by Geoff Deehan in the 1970s), directed by Yavar Abbas, produced by Geoff Deehan, made by Sandlin Productions
- 25 August Spacesuit, the spacesuits that astronauts wore during the Apollo missions to the Moon, and whether such spacesuits would be advanced enough to be worn for future missions to Mars; by 2020, NASA expected to have landed on Mars; at sea-level, air pressure is 14 PSI; ILC Dover in Newark, Delaware has made all NASA spacesuits since the late 1960s; medical research at the Ames Research Center; Joe Kosmo, head of NASA spacesuit design; the invention of the defecation-mitten by Matthew Radnofsky; Bruce Webbon of the Ames Research Centre; the Johnson Space Center also worked on suit design. Directed by Patrick Uden, made by Uden Associates
- 1 September The Falls, about the Niagara Falls. Produced by Clare Odgers, made by the National Film Board of Canada and Primitive Features
- 8 September Re-inventing Japan, looking at Japan's success in applied science, contrasted with less success in pure science and whether Japan could enhance its pure science industry enough, which has connections with a country's own cultural values and outlook, and how Britain has excelled in pure science, but how much that university funding cuts could erode Britain's prowess in pure science; Japan few Nobel prizes, but excelled at applied science and exploiting others' research by reverse engineering; Canon had £6bn of sales, of which 40% were photocopiers, such as the L5; Hajime Mitarai, research director of Canon, and how Canon had eight product divisions, with their own engineering staff in each division, with process physicists and inorganic chemists; with Western science innovations, it often came from a set of individuals, whereas Japan's innovation culture revolved around much intense group cooperation, not individuals; Japan had only won five Nobel prizes since the 1950s - the US had won 135; a youthful Matt Ridley of The Economist; Fujitsu was the world's second-largest manufacturer of computers, and had bought ICL (which had been Ferranti) in 1990, and sold £10bn a year; Naoki Yokoyama and Takahiko Misugi of Fujitsu; Japan could not rely on other countries research anymore, and had to conduct more in-house research; Japan's culture was not greatly known for originality or taking risks, or being surprised; pathologist Sir Anthony Epstein and how Japan greatly revered tradition, and conformity, possibly viewing anyone who didn't likewise confirm as troublesome; electrical engineer Hiroya Fujisaki, of Tokyo University and known for the Fujisaki model, and that he thought that Japan's culture had historically eroded originality; the national research organisation Riken was formed in 1917, and made great progress, with a large cyclotron, and visited by Einstein in December 1922, but the US was suspicious after the war, and destroyed Riken's cyclotron; Minoru Oda, head of Riken from 1988 to 1993; the US distrusted Japan, and preferred Japan to work on mainly applied science; physicist Akira Tonomura at the Hitachi Advanced Laboratory, which had the world's largest electron microscope; Shojiro Asai of Hitachi; the Canon Advanced Research Laboratory; the Tsukuba Science City and the University of Tsukuba, built by the Japanese government for £6bn, and home of the Japanese ERATO science innovation agency; Genya Chiba, director of ERATO; Michio Nagai, former minister of education in the mid-1970s. Directed by Bob Bee, produced by Michael Wills (later Labour MP from 1997 to 2010 for North Swindon), and made by Juniper Productions
- 13 September Theme Park Heaven, Walt Disney; Sylvère Lotringer of Columbia University; Arrow Dynamics of California, with Dal Freeman Ron Toomer; David Lewis; Cedar Point, built by Custom Coasters International of Cincinnati; Eric Westin of Walt Disney Imagineering, and the Big Thunder Mountain Railroad ride; Marc Davis, who drew Tinkerbell in Peter Pan, and who worked on the Pirates of the Caribbean ride, which opened in 1967; Larry Lester and David Codiga of Universal Studios, and their earthquake Studio Tour and Backdraft rides; Dreamland in 1912; psychologist Timothy Leary; Douglas Trumbull and the Back to the Future: The Ride and Luxor Las Vegas; Stan Kinsey of SimEx-Iwerks; Michael Ryder and Thom Dickeson of Evans & Sutherland, and texture mapping onto polygons, a main feature of transportation simulations; Bob Stone of the Advanced Robotics Research Centre at the University of Salford. Narrated by Richard O'Brien, produced by Jerome Kuehl, directed by Graham Moore, made with WGBH and Open Media
- 22 September The Professor's New Clothes, a re-broadcast of an Australian documentary about Professor Vishwa Jit Gupta of Panjab University and his fraudulent work about paleontology of the Himalayas. Directed by Stephen Ramsey, produced by Janet Bell, and made by Film Australia
- 29 September The Gambler's Guide to Winning, the ways of deploying mathematical techniques to win in gambling, with probability theory methods developed by Prof Edward O. Thorp of University of California, Irvine; the disastrous 1967 Grand National, where nearly all the horses fell at the 23rd fence; Frank Honywill George of Brunel University; Ralph Abraham of University of California, Santa Cruz; Peter A. Griffin of California State University, Sacramento; the gambler's fallacy; J. Doyne Farmer of the Santa Fe Institute. Narrated by Andrew Burt, directed by Julian Nott (son of the Conservative former defence secretary Sir John Nott, who later composed the music for Wallace and Gromit films such as The Wrong Trousers), produced by Jenny Barraclough, made by Peninsula Films
- 6 October Superpowers?, with Ray Hyman, about the international group of sceptics Committee for Skeptical Inquiry, who dispute topics such as UFOs, made by Open Media
- 13 October The Lean Burn Machine, about the development of catalytic converters for automotive engines, and how they cause more fuel to be burned than before, and the British engineer Geoffrey West who has produced an alternative, but faced restrictions from EC (EU) legislation; Europe introduced pollution legislation in July 1992; California had the worst vehicle pollution in the US, notably LA; the Clean Air Act; Rob Searles of Johnson Matthey; German environment minister Bernd Schmidbauer - Germany had over two-thirds of European car exports to the US; French physicist Hubert Curien, Minister of Higher Education, Research and Innovation from 1988 to 1993; chemistry graduate Margaret Thatcher being interviewed on 2 March 1989 on the BBC, and lean-burn engines; Bernard Bertrand, head of engine development of Peugeot; Shillington of BL; the new EC legislation in 1992 would outlaw lean-burn powered cars; Dutch automotive writer Gerard Sauer. Narrated by Nick Ross, directed by Nick Abson and Simon Broom, produced by Michael Blakstad (Editor from 1974 of Tomorrow's World), made by Workhouse
- 20 October The Elements, the poet Roger McGough narrates poetry for each element and how the Periodic Table came to be formed; 5% of the Earth's crust is iron; xenon is found in strobe lights; argon is in domestic incandescent light bulbs; the light bulb filament is tungsten, but reserves of tungsten are low. Directed by Ian Duncan, produced by David Dugan, made by Windfall Films (part of Argonon). Shown on 25 November 1992 on The Nature of Things in Canada
- 27 October The Strange Case of Crop Circles, an update to the documentary made in 1990, looking at why the 250 crop circles that appeared in the summer, that around 50% of the circles appeared in Wiltshire; the phenomenon took off after a circle near Westbury was pictured in a local newspaper in 1980; Tim Carson charged £1 per visitor to a circle in 1990, and 7,000 visited the Eastfield Pictogram at Alton Barnes, near Milk Hill; Steve Woolgar; Sir Francis Graham-Smith of the Royal Society, who dismissed those people interested in crop circles as mixed company who talked a lot of rubbish and it was a profit-less business to get involved with people who were completely hooked on the unknown; Serena Roney-Dougal; a youthful-looking Matt Ridley of The Economist said that since episodes with nuclear power in the 1970s, people had questioned evidence that scientists had told them; physicist Terence Meaden, who founded TORRO; Yoshi-Hiko Ohtsuki of Waseda University, who researched ball lightning. Narrated by Gavin Weightman, directed by Jill Freeman, and produced by her husband Michael Wills, made by Juniper Productions
- 3 November Human Waste, new ways of treating excrement such as dry compost toilets, oxidation pools and greenhouses. Directed by Kate Woods (Australian), made by John Blake Associates

The spread of Homo sapiens

- 10 November Dead Men Talk, new dating techniques reveal more about the evolution of man, found from the Skhul and Qafzeh hominins at the Qafzeh cave, and future DNA sequencing methods could reveal from bones how man evolved, it featured Milford H. Wolpoff and Chris Stringer, being similar to the September 1996 edition about Neanderthals; a cave object was thought to be 40,000 years ago, but now was thought to be 100,000 years old; there were two paradigms, one where everyone is from Homo Erectus, and the other where Homo Sapiens evolved exclusively in Africa from Homo Erectus; this theory was from evidence at Border Cave in South Africa, Omo Kibish Formation in Ethiopia, and the Skhul cave; Milford Wolpoff, of the University of Michigan, supported the first multi-regional model; the second Eve theory came from Chris Stringer of the Natural History Museum, who looked at a fossil at Jebel Irhoud, Morocco; new dating techniques were electron spin resonance dating (ESR), deployed by Dr Rainer Grün at the Godwin Laboratory, University of Cambridge, and thermoluminescence dating (TL) which looked at flints that had been heated in primitive fires; a Neanderthal at Kebara Cave was dated at 60,000, with the new dating technique; the two caves, Skhul had homo sapiens, and Tanum Cave had Neanderthals, nearby; Chris Stringer thought that the Neanderthals split 300,000 years ago; the Neanderthal found at Amud Cave had a large brain; Joel Rak of Tel Aviv University believed that Neanderthals were a separate species; geneticist Rebecca L. Cann, of the University of California, Berkeley, was the first to look at the genetics of mitochondria, passed along the female line; this led to the Mitochondrial Eve theory, who was thought to have lived 200,000 years ago; the new PCR technique allowed strands of hair to be genetically sequenced; Anna Di Rienzo developed the mitochondrial genetics technique at Berkeley, and dated Homo Sapiens to have left Africa around 100,000 years ago; the Cro-Magnon appeared in Eastern Europe 40,000 years ago, who were the first to eat fish; Paul Mellars of University of Cambridge; the Vézère valley in France, with a Cro-Magnon cave, from the upper palaeolithic era; Lawrence H. Keeley at the University of Illinois Chicago; Philip Lieberman and the shape of the human tongue, and impacted molars. Narrated by Gillian Hanna, produced by Ray Fitzwalter, directed by David Hart (both former World in Action executives, which was produced by Granada Television), made by Granada Television.
- 17 November Teaching Computers to Think, about early machine learning, with John G. Taylor of the Centre for Neural Networks at King's College London; Igor Aleksander, Professor of Neural Systems at Imperial College; Geoffrey Hinton of the Canadian Institute for Advanced Research at the University of Toronto; Terry Sejnowski and his at the Howard Hughes Medical Institute at the Salk Institute for Biological Studies; Martin Snaith of the Technology Applications Group at Alnwick and genetic algorithms; the early 1980s WiSARD neural network from the RAMnets algorithm at Brunel University London; Randall Beer of the Case Institute in Cleveland, Ohio; Carver Mead (who invented the phrase Moore's law) at Caltech; Robert Worden of Logica Cambridge; Teuvo Kohonen, who developed the self-organizing map of unsupervised learning in 1981 at Helsinki University of Technology. Narrated by Alun Lewis, directed by Gary Leach, produced by Geoff Deehan, produced by Sandlin Productions
- 24 November The Dyslexic Engineer, about Ben Bowlby, born on 2 November 1966; his VS91 car at Snetterton Circuit, with a Vauxhall Astra engine, with footage mostly from the end of the earlier documentary in September 1990; his studies at the Polytechnic of East London; Richard Bowlby, his father from Hampstead, who also realised that he was dyslexic; Rosalind Rathouse, his former remedial teacher; Roy Greenfield, a retired maths teacher from King Alfred School, London, who believed that perhaps people would adapt to mathematics more if the subject was taught later in life, as people are often put off the subject at secondary school; Ben gained nine O-levels but couldn't acquire Mathematics A-level above grade E after, two attempts; Xenia Bowlby; his polytechnic course tutor, Alan Slawson, and limited-slip differentials; his car raced in the Clubman (racing car class); he was sponsored by Ripspeed clothing and Spax Performance shock absorbers; Eric Broadly of Lola Cars; he joined Lola Cars in October 1991; he had attempted to gain a place at Lancaster University to study Engineering; Mike Blanchet of Lola Cars; empirical research in designing and building motor racing cars; Mark Williams, head of Formula 3000 at Lola Cars. Narrated by Ian Holm, produced by Michael Proudfoot, directed by Patrick Uden, made by Uden Associates. Directed by Michael Proudfoot, made by Uden Associates
- 1 December A Setting for St Paul's, about a proposed office block development at Petershill, south of St Paul's Cathedral; Prince Charles' speech in October 1987; in 1956 architect William Holford, Baron Holford designed nearby buildings, built in the 1960s; Norman St John-Stevas, chairman of the Royal Fine Art Commission; William Whitfield; Christopher Mitchell on the planning committee of the City of London Corporation; James Tuckey and Rollin Schlicht, project managers of MEPC (Mitsubishi Estate); architects Ted Cullinan and Robin Nicholson; Hugh Pearman of the Sunday Times; George Cassidy; the architects visit Philip Whitbourn, chief architect at English Heritage; David Jenkin and Frank Duffy of DEGW; Martin Stancliffe, Surveyor of the Fabric of St Paul's Cathedral; painter Roger de Grey. Narrated by Penelope Wilton, produced by Mike Tomlinson and David Sharp, directed by Cathy Denford, made by Orlando Television Productions
- 8 December The Business of Bottled Water, the £300m bottled water industry. Produced by Hilary Lawson, made by TVF Media
- 15 December Rheumatoid Arthritis, British scientists have discovered that sufferers lack a sugar in part of their immune system, namely the glycosylation of glycans on Immunoglobulin G (IgC); David Isenberg at Middlesex Hospital; the Pima tribe in Arizona, studied by British doctor Peter Bennett; the Hu Hu Kam Memorial Hospital in Sacaton, Arizona; Raymond Dwek researched glycobiology, how sugar molecules attached to the surface of cells; Tom Rademacher found that arthritis disappeared during pregnancy; Graham Rook, who researched microbiology at UCL, developed a biochemical test at Middlesex Hospital; people developed arthritis, in groups, across Lyme, Connecticut; Allen Steere of New England Medical Centre, who named Lyme disease. Narrated by Susan Rae, of Radio 4, produced by Sean McPhilemy, directed by Vivienne King, made by Box Productions
- 22 December Unravelling the Universe, theological questions about the creation of the universe, and how general relativity can match with quantum theory; with Michael Green of Queen Mary & Westfield College; Paul Davies of the University of Adelaide; Peter Coles of Queen Mary & Westfield College and how Copernicus struggled to fit his model to the Solar System, until Kepler showed that the orbits were elliptical; how Maxwell was the first to properly understand the electromagnetic force from Faraday's earlier work; Christopher Isham of the Blackett Laboratory and how Maxwell's equations did not fit Newton's laws of motion at the start of the 20th century, resulting in Einstein replacing Newton's laws, and gravity with general relativity in 1915, but in practice Newton's laws worked as expected; quantum theory was originated around the same time; Rocky Kolb of Fermilab and how quantum mechanics and gravity (or relativity) produce incompatible results of infinities and mathematical singularities when calculated together, a situation that was attempted to be resolved by superstring theory. Narrated by Peter Jones, directed by David Barlow, written and produced by Chris Haws, made by InCA Productions

=== 1992 ===
- 9 August The Triumph of the Embryo, it showed how the egg divides, and the chemical signals involved that direct the growing mass of cells; at the start, cell division takes place every 12–15 hours; four days later the embryo reaches the uterus, with about sixty cells; cells moved due to peptide growth factors (peptide hormones; growth is regulated by homeobox genes, a method discovered in 1983 by William McGinnis and Michael Levine; Corey Goodman of the Howard Hughes Medical Institute, and how nerve cells grew; the role of glia cells, described by Colin Blakemore; Lewis Wolpert of UCL; Douglas A. Melton. Narrated by Alun Lewis, directed by Yavar Abbas, produced by Geoff Deehan, made by Union Pictures
- 16 August The Siege of Barcelona, a behind-the-scenes view of how Barcelona prepared for the 25th Summer Olympic Games, and the technical innovations in filming the events. Directed by Chris Haws, produced by Thelma Rumsey, made by InCA Productions
- 6 September Eurofighter, the European Fighter Aircraft (EFA); Britain and Germany originally ordered 250 each, but in 1992, Germany proposed to withdraw from the project from 1999; the Russian threat before 1989 would have been the Sukhoi Su-27 and Mikoyan MiG-29, which could climb at 12 miles a minute, had first flown in 1977, and entered service in 1983, but the MiG-29 lacked a computer flight control system; both the Su-27 and MiG-29 had superb handling characteristics; there were thirty-one USAF squadrons in Germany in the 1980s; Group Captain Ned Frith CBE FRAeS of EFA; the British Aerospace EAP, which flew for 195 hours; France left in 1985; Colin Green of Rolls-Royce Military Engines, and how most turbine blades are made by the lost-wax casting method; University of Nottingham-educated Sue Lyons, project director of Combat Engines at R-R, and the Eurojet EJ200; the Dassault Rafale cost £39m and originally began as a single-seat aircraft; the planned Lockheed YF-22 (the Advanced Tactical Fighter) would cost £70m each; passive electro-optic/infrared sensors; the German Air Force inherited twenty-four MiG-29 aircraft. Narrated by Michael Jayston, produced by Richard Melman, directed by Chris Haws, made by InCA Productions.
- 20 September The Bermuda Triangle, a scientific explanation by geochemist Dr Richard McIver, from observations of mud volcanoes, and the oil and gas industries; Flight 19 left Fort Lauderdale in Florida on 5 December 1945; Charles Berlitz lived in Fort Lauderdale, and had written about the Triangle, and had an encounter with a cylindrical UFO next to a ship at night, where the ship engines and radio communications stopped; Lionel Beer of the British UFO Research Association, and a 1988 incident in Puerto where two military aircraft had intercepted a large triangular UFO, where witnesses claimed that both military aircraft were taken inside the UFO; Bilal U. Haq of the National Science Foundation claimed that all phenomena over the Bermuda Triangle had rational explanations; Colin Summerhayes was director of the Institute of Oceanographic Sciences in Wormley, Surrey (now the National Oceanography Centre); David Roberts of the Marine & Petroleum Geology journal; Richard Selley, head of geology at Imperial College; Yury Makagon of the Hydrocarbon and Environment Institute in Moscow, and methane hydrates were found in Dossor in 1928; Bill Dillon of the USGS at Woods Hole; reflection seismology; many oil rigs in the Caspian Sea had been sunk by blowouts, caused by disturbing hydrate sediments; the Ufa train disaster in June 1989; side-scan sonar. Narrated by Juliet Stevenson (later to narrate many Horizon documentaries), directed by John Simmons, produced by Martine Benoit, made by Geofilms
- 27 September How They Built the Channel Tunnel, looking at the construction of the two crossover places of the tunnel, as big as two football fields, forty metres below the sea bed; AR Dykes, the President of the British Institution of Structural Engineers in 1976; Gordon Crighton, engineering director of TML, David Wallis, project manager of UK Tunnels of TML; the French end of the tunnel was at Beussingue; it took five years; Colin Kirkland, technical director of Eurotunnel; Richard Lewis of Markhams, a steel fabricator in Chesterfield; geologist Malcolm Bolton of the University of Cambridge; Douglas Parkes of Ove Arup; Stewart Campbell of the HSE; tunnelling began from Folkestone in October 1987; many tunnellers were from North East England and the Irish, such as Jim Ahern; 2,000 tonnes of chalk per hour came out of the tunnel during 1989; the laser guidance was made by Zed Systems of London; 440 metres of tunnel per week could be built; tunnel concrete segments were cast on the Isle of Grain, in Kent; nine workers died in accidents - seven on the English side; there are two cross-over caverns; the English cavern was built from the service tunnel, before the main tunnels arrived; the caverns are 21 metres wide, 16 metres high and 147 metres long, with two movable walls; the British Tunnelling Society; Alan Myers, construction manager of the crossover for UK Tunnels; civil engineer John King. Produced by Sandy Balfour, made by Double Exposure
- 4 October Homes on Wheels, about the one in twelve Americans, who live in a mobile home; Allan Wallis; David Thornburg (Galloping Bungalows), and the Tin Can Tourists in 1919; Randall Henderson; Glenn Curtiss Aerocar; Arthur Sherman in the 1930s; the Airstream from William Bowlus of Ryan Aircraft, originally made by Bowlus-Teller then by Wally; designer William Stout; Wilbur Bontrager of Jayco; Lazydays and the Family Motor Coach Association. Directed by George Haggerty, produced by Mike Wallington, made by Kai Productions
- 11 October Born That Way?, about the work of the homosexual British neuroscientist Simon LeVay, meeting a religious opponent of homosexuality, and a psychotherapist who thought that being homosexual was a mental illness; the Salk Institute for Biological Studies, and work on the INAH 3 in the hypothalamus; the work of Magnus Hirschfeld; endocrinologist Günter Dörner of the Humboldt University of Berlin; Louis P. Sheldon of the Traditional Values Coalition, did not approve of any promotion of homosexuality; until 1973 in the US, homosexuality was regarded as a deviant sexual predilection, and thought to be a mental illness; many US psychiatrists thought homosexuality to be a type of mental disorder, notably Charles W. Socarides; Richard Green (sexologist); Dulwich College; psychiatrist Richard Pillard; psychologist J. Michael Bailey, who found that homosexuality had a genetic possibility; Laura Allen and Roger Gorski of UCLA had conducted research on the anterior commissure; molecular geneticist Cassandra Smith; the editor of The Arizona Republic. Directed by Jeremy Taylor, produced by Oliver Morse, made by Windfall Films
- 18 October Antichaos, about order out of chaos, with Ian Stewart of the University of Warwick; Canadian mathematician Brian Goodwin of the Open University, and emergence; the American biologist Stuart Kauffman of the Santa Fe Institute, and Boolean networks; the Danish theoretical physicist Per Bak of Brookhaven National Laboratory; Christopher Langton of the Santa Fe Institute; the American ecologist Tom Ray of the University of Delaware; the economist W. Brian Arthur of Stanford University; J. Doyne Farmer of the Prediction Company; and the American physicist Thomas Valone (a writer on bioelectromagnetics) of the University of New Mexico. Narrated by Alun Lewis, directed by Yavar Abbas, produced by Geoff Deehan, made by Union Pictures
- 25 October The Strange Case of Crop Circles 2, showing what had changed from the previous documentary broadcast on 27 October 1991. Directed by Jill Freeman, produced by Michael Wills, made by Juniper Productions
- 1 November Zen on Wheels, about how Japanese car manufacturers moved a team to Newport Beach, California at the Toyota Calty Design Research, to find out what appealed to buyers of BMW and Mercedes cars, which resulted in the Lexus LS, which outsold Mercedes-Benz and BMW. The Mazda MX-5 was developed around the same time in the US, but had tried to imitate the 1960s Lotus Elan. How Naoki Sakai originated the Italian-heritage Nissan Figaro in the early 1990s - the car, made for Japanese women in a limited production, became so popular that it had to be sold by lottery. How the Mazda research centre at Kanagawa-ku, Yokohama was making intelligent cars. Directed by Sheila Hayman, made by Uden Associates
- 8 November Rebuilding Berlin, how German telecommunication and electrical engineers found great difficulty in connecting the infrastructure and technology of East and West Berlin, which were largely totally incompatible, and why the two technological systems were so different; East and West Germany were founded in 1953; the trains in East (Deutsche Reichsbahn or DR) and West Germany ran on electric motors that worked in opposite ways; Erich Kratky of Berliner Verkehrsbetriebe (former West Berlin Public Transport) and how East Berlin drivers had 60% of those in West Berlin; Mahlow station, on the S2 line on the Berlin S-Bahn, was completely rebuilt in 1991, opening on 31 August 1992; before 1989, West Berlin could not connect to any neighbouring electrical power networks, so had to make all of its own power itself, by nine power stations; in 1992 West Berlin could not make enough electrical power;Jürgen Beyer of the East Berlin Electricity Board; in 1992 East and West Germany could not connect their electricity systems together; Klaus Krämer of the West Berlin Electricity Board, and how East German load frequency control (LFC) was not good enough for West Germany; East German power stations were polluting; Müggelsee in East Berlin; East Berlin had natural gas - from Russia - but West Berlin did not have natural gas, and had to produce its own gas from processing, and there were many more gas leaks in East Berlin, run by the Berlin Gas Board, and British Gas plc was installing most of the new plastic gas mains in East Berlin; one fifth of housing in East Berlin was uninhabitable, due to lack of renovation and unsafe electrical wiring; much housing in East Berlin did not have any bathrooms; the post system in East Berlin was three times slower than West Berlin, as it was all sorted by hand, and mail hand to be sent in standard envelopes only, in East Germany - the two post systems were incompatible, and East and West Germany had totally different postcode systems, although both had four digits, so a letter was put in front of each Deutsche Post postcode, to show if it was an East or West German postcode; in 1952, telephone connections between East and West Germany were stopped, but four lines were installed in 1972; the East German telephone exchanges were all mechanical, and could not transmit any digital communications; one in ten people in East Berlin had a phone - telecommunications in East Berlin were hopeless and expensive; in 1992 Deutsche Telekom connected East and West Berlin, and the price would be a local call, not the price of an international call, under the phrase Wir schaffen Verbingdungen; not only were East German telecommunications often impossible, but the Stasi secret police were listening in to most calls; Rudolf Reichel of the former East German Economic Institute; science research in East Germany had been greatly restricted; Volker Hassemer; East Germans viewed West Germans as selfish, and West Germans viewed East Germans as backward. Narrated by Su-Lin Looi, directed by Cosima Dannoritzer, produced by Karl Sabbagh, made by Skyscraper Productions
- 15 November 21st Century Jet, how the Boeing 777 moved from the drawing board to manufacture in 1992, with the innovative new method called CATIA; the Boeing 777 was the largest jet aircraft to have been developed mostly by computer, with assembly beginning in January 1993; there were 10,000 people in the 777 programme, who met the managers in a weekly meeting; meeting the needs of Robert Crandall of American Airlines, and competition from the new Airbus A340; parts of the tail were built in Australia; the nose cone and flaps were made in Italy; the landing gear was made in Canada, the US, and France; parts of the wing ribs and passenger doors were made in Japan; the nose landing gear door was made in Belfast; some of the electronics was made in England; there were about 230 design teams, from different manufacturers; the CATIA system was a digital mockup; Thomas Gaffney, head of passenger doors; Henry Shomber, one of the chief engineers; John Roundhill, a chief project engineer; United Airlines placed the first order, which started the project; Al Tyler of Aerospace Technologies of Australia (ASTA), who made the 777 rudder - the company became Boeing Australia; John King, Baron King of Wartnaby of British Airways visits to look at legroom for the new 777. Narrated by Simon Prebble, directed by Karl Sabbagh, made by Skyscraper Productions
- 22 November The Puzzle of HIV, scientists after ten years did not understand how HIV worked; immunologists Anthony Fauci and Max Essex; Angus Dalgleish of St George's, University of London; virologist Stephen S. Morse, and the origination of viruses, and how most pandemics originated in China; Stella Knight of the MRC, and dendritic cells, researched by Brigid Balfour; French immunologist Jean-Claude Ameisen of the Pasteur Institute of Lille; virologist Jonas Salk; Claude Nicolau, and the CD4 glycoprotein. Narrated by Scottish actress Sandra Clark, directed by Nigel Maslin, produced by Chris Haws, made by InCA Productions
- 29 November The Alpha Link, much of medical understanding of radiation protection and health comes from what occurred in Japan in August 1945. Martin Gardner (1940–93), an epidemiologist, and Professor of Medical Statistics at the University of Southampton, thought that health was affected by working in a nuclear power station, which the British nuclear industry vehemently would not believe. Directed by Vivienne King, made by Box Productions
- 6 December Toying with the Future, about electronic children's toys, visiting Ocean Software in Manchester; Brian Sutton-Smith of the University of Pennsylvania, and how toys were small replicas of large world events; Eugene F. Provenzo of the University of Miami and how the culture of childhood began in the early 1700s, and how German Friedrich Fröbel developed educational toys in the early 1800s, but it often lacked fun; Meccano Ltd sets, developed by Frank Hornby, launching the international Meccano Guild network of children's mechanical clubs in 1919, publicised by the Meccano Magazine; Richard Gregory, neuropsychologist at the University of Bristol, and his Exploratory Hands-on Science Centre, which closed in 1999, replaced by We the Curious in 2000; toy designer Patrick Rylands; Gary Bracey of Ocean Software; Keith Tinman, computer game musician; Elizabeth Curran of GameTek; Ocean Software designers Ray Coffey, James Higgins and Dawn Drake. Directed by Christopher Rawlence, produced by Debra Hauer, made by Rawlence Hauer Productions
- 13 December The Elements, a repeat of the 20 October 1991 episode
- 20 December E.T. Please Phone Earth, about the SETI Institute, with Prof Philip Morrison, a professor of physics at MIT, who played a starring if not dangerous role in the Manhattan Project; Jill Tarter at the Hat Creek Radio Observatory in California; Dr John Billingham, a British medical doctor at the Ames Research Center in California; Prof Antony Hewish of the University of Cambridge, who discovered pulsars in 1967; Frank Drake, and his work at the National Radio Astronomy Observatory in Green Bank, West Virginia; Barney Oliver of SETI; David Blair of the University of Western Australia; Paul Horowitz of Harvard University; the Ohio State University Radio Observatory (known as Big Ear) and its 1977 Wow! signal; Jack Cohen; chemist Stanley Miller and his 1953 experiment; blind SETI investigator Kent Cullers; and biologist Jared Diamond from UCLA. Jointly made with ABC of Australia, narrated by Heather Couper, directed by Richard Smith, produced by Stuart Carter, made by Pioneer Productions

=== 1993 ===
- 18 July The Real Jurassic Park, an Equinox Special and also called Jurassic Park Revisited, it looked at whether the film could happen, with American geologist Jim Kirkland of Colorado Mesa University, and Jack Horner, the scientific advisor for the film; Dale Marcellini of Washington Zoo; Ward Wheeler of the American Museum of Natural History and extracting DNA from insects encased in amber, by the PCR method; the work of Raul Cano with Hendrik Poinar at the Department of Entomology at the University of California, Berkeley; Noreen Tuross; Mary Higby Schweitzer and Jack Horner of Montana State University; Robert T. Bakker; geneticist Stephen J. O'Brien of the National Cancer Institute in Virginia; development biologist Peter Anthony Lawrence of the MRC Laboratory of Molecular Biology in Cambridge, with French biologist Jean-Paul Vincent and biochemist Rob Kay; conservation biologist Bill Toone of the California Condor Recovery Program.; Bruce H. Tiffney of University of California, Santa Barbara with Karen Chin; geologist Jim Kirkland. Narrated by Andrew Sachs, produced by Oliver Morse, jointly made with the WGBH Educational Foundation, directed by David Dugan, made by Windfall Films
- 15 August Bridging the Future, about the science, engineering and technology of bridge-building; the programme examines why bridges sometimes spectacularly fail, and how ever-longer and higher spans are achievable; the programme is introduced by Spike Milligan who recites the poems of William McGonagall, extolling the virtues and sorrows of the legendary Tay Bridge. The program features engineers and architects from around the world, including Santiago Calatrava; italian structural engineer Mario Salvadori of Columbia University; Danish civil engineer and bridge designer Klaus Ostenfeld, and grandson of civil engineer Asger Ostenfeld; civil engineer Mark Whitby and the innovative Severn Bridge, which deployed box girders; Irish civil engineer Patrick J. Dowling, head of the Department of Civil and Environmental Engineering, Imperial College London; the Severn Bridge was taking much heavy traffic at 4-6 am each weekday morning, the amounts of heavy traffic that it had not been inherently designed for, in the late 1950s to take, and the bridge was strengthened in 1990; David Blockley, head of civil engineering at the University of Bristol, and earthquake protection; the 1989 Loma Prieta earthquake; Colin Taylor, head of civil engineering from 2006-11 at the University of Bristol; the Jinde Bridge; the Japanese Great Seto Bridge opened in April 1988; the Pont de Normandie was twice as large of any previous similar type of bridge, and its 206m towers were completed in July 1993, being 250m longer than the 1993 Yangpu Bridge; French civil engineer Michel Virlogeux, and the project manager Bertrand Deroubaix; tuned mass dampers; Spanish structural engineer Santiago Calatrava, who designed the 1992 Alamillo Bridge and 1991 Lusitania Bridge in Mérida, Spain; Peter Head (civil engineer) of Maunsell Group (now AECOM). Narrated by Roger Allam, produced by Richard Melman, written, produced and directed by Chris Haws, made by InCA Productions
- 22 August The Emperor's New Mind, about artificial intelligence, with mathematician Roger Penrose, a play on words of the phrase Emperor's new clothes; Canadian Hans Moravec of the Robotics Institute; a scene from the edition Figure it out of the Look at Life (film series); the Mathematical Institute, University of Oxford; children of Westfields Junior School in Yateley, Hampshire, and a middle school in Oxford; crudely-operating computers were not intuitive in forming or deducing algorithms - computers could not truly understand such general rules; Euclidean tilings by convex regular polygons, and whether computers could calculate such possibilities; Gödel's incompleteness theorems; in 1974 the Arecibo Ionospheric Observatory found the Hulse–Taylor binary, the first binary pulsar found, which confirmed general relativity; wave function collapse; the cytoskeleton, microtubules and noncomputability; computers would only be able to simulate the computable parts of reasoning, and not any more. Directed by Bob Bee, produced by Michael Wills, made by Juniper Productions
- 5 September Fatal Protein, looking at the cause of CJD in humans, BSE in cattle, and scrapie in sheep; BSE was killing 1,000 British cattle a week; a brain disorders conference in Jamaica; in Papua New Guinea, the disease was called kuru or 'the laughing death', first found in the Okapa District in early 1950s by Carlton Gadjusek; Australian Michael Alpers took an interest in 1960s, at the Institute of Medical Research; epidemiologist Paul Brown of the National Institutes of Health; chimpanzees were tested on, and one suffered from ataxia; GSS, discovered in Austria, was similar, and found in Indiana; Martin Farlow, of the Indiana University Medical Center; most research was carried out on mice and hamsters; Stanley B. Prusiner of California named the prion, and thought that the protein did not require DNA to be made; the Institute of Molecular Systems Biology of ETH Zurich, and Charles Weiss mann, who looked for a section of mRNA that could make the protein, and in 1985 found a possible section of DNA; husband and wife, Harry Baker and Ros Ridley of the MRC in London discovered in 1989 that a genetic mutation could cause the prion to be made; seventeen possible genetic mutations were found in total in the UK; children treated with human growth hormone were found, in May 1985, to have CJD; Michael Preece of the UCL Great Ormond Street Institute of Child Health in London; more cases were found in France in 1992; scrapie in sheep; remains of sheep, in cattle feed caused BSE, which was discovered in 1986; Ray Bradley, head of BSE research at the Central Veterinary Laboratory; Graham Medley, a disease modeller at Imperial College, who looked at other modes of possible transmission, than contaminated animal feed; James Kirkwood, of the Institute of Zoology in London, and infection in the greater kudu; Gordon Hunter, veterinary researcher; Hamish Chalmers of Redesdale in Northumberland, and scrapie-resistant Swaledale sheep, which were bred at the Institute for Research on Animal Diseases (now the Pirbright Institute) at Compton, Berkshire; the amyloid beta protein of dementia, and research on marmosets. Narrated by Libby Purves, directed by John Bird, produced by Mike Johnstone, made by Langham Productions
- 12 September Your Flight in Their Hands, about aviation safety in Europe; over a million passenger flights occurred in the UK each year in the early 1990s, but no crash due to ATC error has taken place; flights were expected to double in 20 years; the technology being deployed in UK airspace, with Gordon Doggett, head of the London Area Control Centre (LATCC); Keith Mack, the Director-General from 1988 to 1993 of Eurocontrol; a British Airways Boeing 737 BA466 takes a route over Ortac to Madrid; Karl-Heinz Neumeister, the Secretary-General of the Association of European Airlines; the aviation writer Rigas Doganis. Directed by Richard Vaughan, produced by Chris Haws, made by InCA Productions
- 19 September Fear of Falling, about rock climbing and caving equipment; the single-rope technique (SRT), demonstrated by Nigel Atkins of Pennine National Caving, with a dynamic climbing rope, maillon rapide, snap-gate carabiner, ascender and descender; Ben Lyon of Tebay; a climbing harness, designed by Don Whillans, and the belay loop at Troll Safety Equipment (later Bacou-Dalloz, bought by Sperian of France) in Saddleworth; Simon Nadin; the Foundry indoor climbing centre, opened by Jerry Moffatt in 1991; Undercover Rock at St Werburgh's Church, Bristol; sport climbing; Ben Moon in Derbyshire. Directed by Steve Stevenson, produced by Mike Wallington, made by Parvenu Productions
- 3 October Family Fortunes, about how children's mental development or health is affected or hindered by growing up in a one-parent-family. Looking at HM Prison Deerbolt in County Durham and Maudsley Hospital in South London, and divorce and one-parent families had different effects; Iain Duncan Smith talks of being 'victims in society of a social experiment over many decades'; Jonathan Sacks, Baron Sacks talking of a 'national consensus that something was missing in the moral environment'; there was a belief that juvenile crime was linked to single parents and broken homes; Michael Anderson, Professor of Economic History at the University of Edinburgh, claimed that it was all due to current politicians wanting to nostalgically return to a 'golden age' of civility, and he inferred that 'Victorian values' had no importance; a training session for single parents in Maudsley Hospital in Southwark; Michael Wadsworth (sociologist) and the National Survey of Health & Development, which had around 5,000 on the cohort study, and had been set up for establishing the NHS - it showed that divorce increased chances of divorce in children, and of delinquency in children; Martin Richards (psychologist) of the University of Cambridge's Centre for Family Research, and the 1958 National Child Development Study, which looked all of the 17,000 born in one week in early March, and showed similar results to the previous study; the Marriage Research Centre began a study of 65 married couples in 1979; Penny Mansfield CBE of OnePlusOne said that women, after entering the workplace in greater numbers, were now having higher expectations of men's contribution to a marriage; the divorce rate was now 40%, with 33% of divorces occurring in the first five years of marriage; lone parents were now 19% of all British families; for children of divorced parents, 95% would stay with the mother, and within two years, 50% of these children would lose contact totally with their father; Prof John Newson, husband of Elizabeth Newson, and the Child Development Research Unit, founded in 1958 at the University of Nottingham - he said that juvenile delinquency was heavily related to the lower social classes - for the bottom two social classes, one quarter of the children receive a criminal record; David P. Farrington and Donald J. West of the University of Cambridge, conducted a study of 400 London boys born in 1953, known as the Cambridge Study in Delinquent Development; in the study, 37% of all boys acquired a criminal record, but of those with three known determining factors, 75% had a criminal record; 50% of the crime in the study was conducted by only 22 boys, 6% of the total; a study had taken place from 1962 to 1967 in Ypsilanti, Michigan on early years education; similar schemes in the UK were called Head Start, and the main project in the UK was HighScope, with a few schemes at primary schools funded by the Home Office. Directed by Richard Denton, produced by Geoff Deehan, made by Union Pictures
- 10 October In the Path of a Killer Volcano, with seismologists Dave Harlow, Richard Hoblitt, and John Ewert of the United States Geological Survey; although the biggest volcanic explosion since Krakatoa was about to occur, the seismologists at Philippine Institute of Volcanology, and Seismology (PHIVOLCS) and its director Ray Punongbayan, were mostly totally unaware of anything that abnormal; PHIVOLCS put a seismometer near the volcano, and it recorded over 400 earthquakes in just two days near the summit, so Ray Punongbayan requested urgent assistance from the US Geological Survey; Clark Air Base and U.S. Naval Base Subic Bay were around ten miles away, so seven seismic stations were in place by early May; a helicopter was flown around the site and air samples were taken for a correlation spectrometer to detect any sulphur dioxide, with the ultraviolet; Christopher G. Newhall described how sulphur dioxide detection went from 500 tonnes a day to 5000 tonnes by the end of the month; Mount Katmai in Alaska had been the 20th Century's largest volcanic explosion in early June 1912; a level-4 volcanic event is declared two days before the eruption and 120,000 people are evacuated from a 12-mile radius, but the USAF don't feel the immediate need to move; in only that same week, an eruption had been watched on Mount Unzen in Japan, and its pyroclastic flow, but those scientists who felt apparently safe when watching at close hand were caught out when the flow unexpectedly changed direction and they were trapped and were burned to death; on the morning of 10 June, the USAF base was evacuated 48 hours before the first eruption on 12 June, but the main eruption took place three days later on 15 June, with most of the scientists at the USAF base; the mud flows, known as lahar, caused the most damage by filling rivers so causing many floods; the cloud of debris would circle the globe, and reduced global average temperature by one degree over five years; the 1985 eruption of Nevado del Ruiz in Colombia had led to the Armero tragedy, killing more than 20,000 of the town's 29,000 as the eruption was not forecast. Originally a Nova documentary made in 1992, also produced by Paula S. Apsell, a joint British-American production, produced by Noel Buckner, made by WGBH
- 17 October Fly Navy, about the Nimitz class carrier the USS Theodore Roosevelt (CVN-71) (TR) which sailed through the Suez Canal and the Mediterranean Sea, with 6,000 sailors; the Grumman F-14 Tomcat, the McDonnell Douglas F/A-18 Hornet, and the Grumman A-6 Intruder; Operation Deny Flight off Bosnia; on 28 June 1993 the carrier left the US to patrol the no fly zone over Iraq; George L Markfelder; it had 4.5 acres of flight deck, with around eighty aircraft; Jeff Lewis, an Intruder pilot; the Tomcat entered service in 1974; John Lehman, United States Secretary of the Navy from 1981–87; Admiral Leighton W. Smith Jr., deputy operations director of the US Navy; Captain Stanley Bryant, commanding officer of the TR; on 15 July 1993 the TR travelled through the Suez Canal; the carrier's aircraft dropped 2,400 tonnes of bombs in Desert Storm; Lieutenant Bill Grap, a Tomcat pilot; the galley of the TR that served 8,600 meals a day, needing around 3,000 eggs a day; Captain Mark Wise, Hornet pilot; Admiral Thomas Hinman Moorer, Chairman of the Joint Chiefs of Staff from 1970–74; inspecting a Grumman Tomcat; Commander Richard Johnson, in charge of the flight deck; the yellow-coloured flight deck crew taxi the aircraft; the green-coloured flight deck crew launch the aircraft; the Hornet launch is controlled by its onboard computers, not the pilot, travelling from 0 to 160 mph in two seconds; a US Navy berthing compartment, holding around seventy airmen; Admiral Jay L. Johnson, the Battlegroup commander; Commander John Stufflebeem, leader of the VFA-103 F-14 squadron; Lt Barry McKibben, of the tactical unit; the Northrop Grumman E-2 Hawkeye airborne early warning aircraft, with Lt Scotty Bruce, Tactical Coordination officer, who watched for unidentified 'bogies' - the E-2 could take control of the fighter aircraft for the best interception; the E-6A Prowler had electronic jamming and could launch the AGM-88 HARM missile; Lt Chris Heath, Prowler pilot and Lt Darryl Leinhardt, electronic countermeasures officer; the HOTAS and forward-looking infrared systems of the Hornet; Commander Richard Kurrus aircraft handling officer; on landing, pilots attempt to catch the third of four wires; the Harold Wilson government of the UK decided to retire the UK's large strike carriers in 1966, which may have prompted the Falklands War, as the Argentinians would not have contemplated such an invasion otherwise; the French have the largest Navy in Europe, with its Foch carrier, and the new Dassault Rafale aircraft; the Invincible class light aircraft carriers were not recognised by the American military as full aircraft carriers; Captain Fabian Malbon, commanding officer of the Invincible; the Nimitz class was heavily protected against incoming attacks; Colonel John Schmidt of the Marine Ground Force; Denis Healey, Secretary State of Defence from 1964–70 and his cancellation of new British carriers in 1966; Admiral of the Fleet Terence Lewin; Admiral Edward H. Martin, Commander of the United States Sixth Fleet from 1983–85; the A-6 Intruder was planned to leave service in 1999, and to be replaced by the AFX, which was cancelled in 1991. Narrated by Bob Peck, directed by Gary Johnstone, produced by Patrick Uden, made by Uden Associates, originally a Nova documentary
- 24 October Out of the Past, how the Maya civilization collapsed; The world's population was 5 billion - it was 2 billion 50 years before; archaeologists William T. Sanders and William Fash, and the Maya civilization at Copán, in what is now mostly Guatemala; archaeologists William D. Like and Rebecca Storey. Narrated by Jill Dando, and made with Pennsylvania State University. An American production, produced by Sam Low, made by the Cambridge Studios of WQED
- 31 October Memories Are Made of This, the biochemical mechanism of memory, with memory dysfunction at St Andrew's Hospital in Northampton, and infant studies by Gary Lynch (neuroscientist) at University of California, Irvine, and Portuguese neuroscientist Alcino J. Silva at Cold Spring Harbor Laboratory had found genes for long-term memory; Alan Baddeley of the University of Cambridge; Carolyn Rovee-Collier of Rutgers University; Charles A. Nelson III of the University of Minnesota; Marigold Linton of the University of Arizona; neurobiologist James McGaugh. Directed by David Cohen, made by Psychology News
- 7 November Life and Art, about assisted reproductive technology (ART) and zygote intrafallopian transfer; Debra Hauer gives a talk at Acland Burghley School; Hossam Abdalla (now on the Human Tissue Authority at the Lister Hospital, Chelsea; the assisted zona hatching technique; intracytoplasmic sperm injection; Robert Winston, Baron Winston of Hammersmith Hospital. Directed by Debra Hauer, produced by Christopher Rawlence, made by Hauer Rawlence
- 21 November Building for Earthquakes, earthquake engineering in Mexico City; Edward Bortugno of the Office of Emergency Services, California; structural engineer Enrique Martinez Romero of Mexico, and the building of the Mexican Social Security Institute; an earthquake was expected near Acapulco in the next ten years; the North Anatolian Fault is the world's most energetic fault; seismologist Polat Gulkan of the Middle East Technical University; Attilla Ansal, editor of the Bulletin of Earthquake Engineering; Müzeher Erciyastepe of the İnşaat Mühendisleri Odası (IMO, Chamber of Engineers); the gecekondu unsafe buildings; the recent 1992 Erzincan earthquake. Narrated by Seán Barrett (actor), directed by Nick Read, produced by Bill Redway, made by October Films
- 28 November Space Shuttle Discovery, the Johnson Space Center in Texas, and the ACTS satellite (launched in September 1993 on STS-51) and the shuttle pallet satellite (SPAS) system; the 57th mission of the shuttle - STS-51; Commander Frank L. Culbertson Jr.; 15,000 people are needed for each shuttle mission; the external tank has a half million gallons of fuel; the shuttle launches on the fourth attempt, two months after the first attempt; at 61,000 ft, it was at 1,700 mph; the rocket boosters were always jettisoned after two minutes and ten seconds; if two engines failed, the shuttle would land at Banjul International Airport in west Africa, if one engine failed, the shuttle would reach orbit; Hubert Brasseux, in charge of the shuttle toilet system - astronauts were strapped down to the toilet, and each had colour-coded individual urinal funnels; the Space Shuttle Orbital Maneuvering System is fired, in preparation for atmospheric entry; reentry occurs on day eleven - the underside reaches 2000C; the orbiter lands at 300 mph. Narrated by Heather Couper, produced by Stuart Carter, made by Pioneer Productions
- 5 December Serious Fun, about Sim City; the video game industry was 20bn, bigger than film industry; Peter Main of Nintendo; Japanese musician Dai Satō; Japanese games designer Shigeru Miyamoto, and how the 3-D effect on games was achieved through polygon rendering, such as the polygon mesh; games designer Ed Annunziata; Lucy Bradshaw (game developer) of Electronic Arts, of California, who developed SimCity in 1989; software engineer Craig Reynolds (computer graphics) of Electronic Arts; sports commentator John Madden, appearing in the EA Sports game Madden NFL; a wire-frame model of a face had around four thousand polygons; sequencing the voice with the movement of the face was done with a software package called KISS; the British Syndicate (1993 video game); Ron Martinez of Spectrum HoloByte, and their game Star Trek: The Next Generation – A World for All Seasons; Paul Rioux of Sega. Directed by Sheila Hayman, made by Tra La La
- 12 December End of a Dynasty, about the execution of the Romanov family on 17 July 1918 at Yekaterinburg in Sverdlovsk Oblast. Directed by Julian Nott, made by Peninsula Films

=== 1994 ===
- 28 August For Whom the Road Tolls, about road charging; the M25-M23 Merstham junction; Anthony Pratt of Peek; Brian Harbord of the Highways Agency; George Giannapoulos of the University of Thessalonika; Stuart Cole of the University of North London; the Rebecca riots in 1843 in Wales; railways stopped turnpikes; there were 25 million cars on UK roads; Edmund King of the RAC; motorways could hold two thousand cars per lane per hour, at the most; Cologne Cathedral; the A555 between Cologne and Bonn, on a GPS electronic tolling experiment; Uwe Pertz of DeTe Mobil; Adept at Newcastle University, run by Saab, Peek and the EU, tested in Greece; the A167(M) and the Robinson Library; Philip Blythe of Newcastle University; Greece had 25 toll sites on its motorways; Trondheim in Norway had an electronic toll system since 1991, with total enforcement; Gunnar Frederiksen of Trolag; Peter Enter of Siemens, and an early version of ANPR; Chris Leithead of the Metropolitan Police; the M6 in Lunedale in Cumbria; 15% of traffic in the UK was on motorways, with an average of 5,000 miles per year per driver; Godstone traffic control centre in Surrey; individual rogue motorists could cause hold ups. Narrated by Julie Berry, produced by Jeremy Bugler, directed by Richard Klein, made by Fulmar Television & Film
- 4 September Walking on Water, about surfing, with Ken Bradshaw, Edward Coventry, Viscount Deerhurst; Waimea Bay has the largest ridable waves in the world, with 50 feet waves; the waves originate from Japan; Mark Foo, who later drowned that year at Mavericks, California; Huntington Beach, California, known as Surf City. Directed by Steve Stevenson, produced by Mike Wallington, made by Parvenu Productions
- 11 September The Cyborg Cometh, Austrian Manfred Clynes invented the term cyborg for NASA in the 1950s; Prof Donna Haraway, author of the 1985 A Cyborg Manifesto; the nascent internet, and SF Net; Mike Browne, who had a skiing accident in 1993 making him paraplegic, the founder of Snow and Rock, now owned by Cotswold Outdoor; Lisa Jean Moore, the semen industry, techno-semen, and The Sperm Bank of California; prenatal testing; David Bentley of the MRC's Human Genome Mapping Project at the Sanger Centre (now the Wellcome Sanger Institute). Narrated by actress Nicola Duffett, directed by Gary Johnstone, produced by Paul Wilmshurst
- 18 September Coral Grief, 50 million years ago, northern Italy was under water; David Bellwood of James Cook University; David Barnes of the Australian Institute of Marine Science; biologist Garry Russ; the Florida Reef and Craig Quirolo; a 1970 episode of Four Corners (Australian TV program); Peter Moran and Sea star wasting disease; Peter Isdale and Bette Willis; biologist Angel Alcala of Silliman University, who was Secretary of Environment and Natural Resources from 1992–95; Peter Harrison of the National Marine Science Centre, Australia; geochemist Michael Gagan of the Australian National University. Narrated by Paul Barry, produced by Daryl Karp, directed by Richard Smith, an Australian production, made by ABC
- 25 September Cleared for Take-off, the years leading to the first flight of the Boeing 777, planned for May 1995; testing the Boeing 777 APU in cold weather in Alaska; Boeing put £5bn into the testing; Alan Mulally, head of the 777 team; the evangelical management process of 'Working Together', to avoid secrecy; Ronald Ostrowski, director of engineering on the 777; the engines cost 20% of the total cost; Granville Frazier of propulsion; the ETOPS standard for twin-engined aircraft; Chester Ekstrand; the first ever 747 is fitted with a 777 testbed engine; the Pratt Whitney test rig at the Aero-propulsion Systems Test Facility at Tullahoma, Tennessee; Baldey Mehta of the 777 engine; John Cashman, the chief 777 test pilot; the 777 engine testbed has an engine surge, on take off; Thomas Davenport, head of the 777 program for Pratt Whitney; Rocky Thomas of Propulsion; the 777 fuselage is pressurised in January 1994, for the first time from 5 psi to 12 psi; Philip M. Condit; Neil Standal of the fabrication division; Jim McWha of flight testing; Lyle Eveland, head of factory operations; the 777 has its first flight on 12 June 1994, to test the aircraft stability; Frank Shrontz, head of Boeing. Narrated by Miriam Margolyes, directed by Karl Sabbagh, made by Skyscraper Productions with KCTS
- 5 October The Mystery of Anastasia, an Equinox Special, about Anna Anderson; the Romanovs were murdered in Siberia on 17 July 1918; the Forensic Science Service at Aldermaston; forensic scientist William R. Maples; Peter Kurth; David Ellen, of Scotland Yard; Gleb Botkin; Peter Vanezis, Regius Professor of Forensic Medicine (Glasgow) and ears; former Danish ambassador to Germany Herluf Zahle; Ernest Louis, Grand Duke of Hesse hired detective Martin Knopf, who found Anna Anderson's possible name; Geoff Oxley, and facial recognition computing looking at Frances; Patrick Lincoln of London Hospital Medical College, and heredity of blood groups, and the A2 blood group; Peter French, who researched pronunciation; pathologist Hunt MacMillan III and Peter Gill of the Forensic Science Service (Birmingham); in Charlottesville in June 1994; David Enoch (psychiatrist) of the Royal Liverpool University Hospital; the Duke of Edinburgh provided a blood sample to prove mitochondrial DNA, as he was related to Anastasia; Prince Rostislav Rostislavovich Romanov (1938-1999), father of Prince Rostislav Romanov (born 1985); Kevin Sullivan of the Forensic Service; Anna Anderson was not Anastasia, according to mitochondrial DNA of the Duke of Edinburgh. Narrated by Paul Daneman, directed by Julian Nott, made by Peninsula Films
- 9 October The Rubber Universe, in 1929 Hubble's law was discovered, but the Hubble constant was not fully known - about the Hubble constant, which could be between 50 and 85, which meant that the universe could be 14 billion years old, not 8 billion years old, for a constant of 50; scientists were highly protective of any discoveries that they made, or not, but that did not always lead to good outcomes for all concerned - such as the relationship between Allan Sandage, who thought the Hubble constant was about 50, and the French Gérard de Vaucouleurs; Canadian Sidney van den Bergh looked at the Hubble constant as well; Tod R. Lauer of the Kitt Peak National Observatory; the Hubble constant was determined from supernovae, known as standard candles or the cosmic distance ladder; Fermilab thought the age of the universe was around 20 billion years, which would imply a low Hubble constant; helioseismology was a new method; astrophysicist Michael Rowan-Robinson of Imperial College; French Pierre Lamarque and the age of globular clusters; astrophysicist Simon White of the University of Cambridge, and how the Moon weighs 80 times less than the Earth; John Huchra; physicist Neil Turok of Princeton University and physicist Alan Guth of MIT, and the universe's density parameter Ω, calculated from the Friedmann equations; Mexican Carlos Frenk of Durham University; the higher the Hubble constant, a conventional explanation of the Big Bang was more difficult; Jim Peebles of Princeton University; physicist Frank Close and perception of time. Narrated by Charlotte Cornwell. Part of the programme led to The Time Machine (Alan Parsons album) in 1999 (Parsons also made the music for the episode). Directed by Storm Thorgerson, produced by Geoff Deehan, made by Union Pictures
- 16 October Hypnosis - The Big Sleep, with Nicholas Spanos of Canada, and John Gruzelier and Graham Wagstaffe of the University of Liverpool; the documentary has scenes of gruesome medical procedures; Australian John Gruzelier of Charing Cross and Westminster Medical School; the 1923 poem Stopping by Woods on a Snowy Evening by Robert Frost; Helen Crawford of Virginia State University, and chronic pain and evoked potential; Karl H. Pribram of Radford University in Virginia; Dabney Ewin of Tulane Medical Center in New Orleans; surgeon Ángel Escudero, of Spain, who operated without anaesthetic; the 1962 social conformity experiments of Stanley Milgram; stage hypnosis with stage hypnotist Andrew Newton, in Blackpool, who makes participants on stage think that they are one of the Seven Dwarfs. Narrated by Michael Angelis, directed by Graham Moore, produced by David Britland, made by Open Media. In 2022 the film was the subject of a lengthy article
- 6 November Rave New World, with Charles Grob, Alexander Shulgin. Narrated by Tom Baker, produced by Phil Craig, directed by Paul Sen, made by McDougall Craig Productions
- 20 November Brave New Babies, about prenatal and perinatal psychology and cognitive musicology of Brent Logan of Oregon who had adapted the work of child psychologist Lee Salk (whose brother Jonas Salk had invented a vaccine for polio) in the 1970s, with psychologist Prof Peter Hepper of Queen's University Belfast; the neuroscientist Marian Diamond and environmental enrichment; pediatrician Prof Michael Lazarev and the Children's Rehabilitation Medicine Centre in Moscow. Narrated by actress Miranda Richardson
- 27 November Dismantling the Bomb, Pantex in Texas; START II in January 1993; Ted Taylor (physicist); eighteen scientists from the UK worked on the Manhattan Project; the plutonium fissile material, which was half the world's supply, for the July Trinity (nuclear test) was carried on the back seat of a car, to be assembled; the bomb was hoisted on 14 July 1945; a warning flare was fired, then the electrical circuits were connected at 5.29am on 16 July 1945; the bomb was dropped twenty one days later, exploding at 1,900 feet; the Russians developed the bomb through the work of Igor Kurchatov and Yulii Khariton; much American nuclear weapon research also took place at Livermore, California; the first British nuclear test, on 3 October 1952, was set up by two people on HMS Plym; many US weapon cores had been made at the Rocky Flats Plant in Colorado; Viktor Mikhailov (politician), Russian minister of nuclear power; the Nuclear Control Institute. Narrated by Scottish actor Tom Cotcher, produced by Chris Haws, directed by Richard Melman, made by InCA Productions
- 4 December Electric Skies, about lightning at the Langmuir Laboratory for Atmospheric Research; electrical engineer Martin A. Uman of the University of Florida; lightning can be heard fifteen miles away; physicist Earle Williams of MIT, who researched thunderstorms in New Mexico; at any time, there are around two thousand thunderstorms across the Earth's atmosphere, mostly in the tropics; Lightning Alley is in Florida, sixty miles wide, where it occurs around ninety days a year; the top of a thunderstorm cloud is around twelve miles high, the top of the stratosphere; in the US around four hundred people are hit by lightning, killing half of them; Langmuir is part of New Mexico Institute of Mining and Technology; the Museum of Science (Boston). Directed by Richard Burke, produced by Heather Couper and her husband, made by Pioneer Productions. Won the Best Popular Science Documentary at the Banff Mountain Film Festival. Q.E.D. on BBC One also made a documentary on lightning, called Acts of God on Wednesday 16 March 1983, narrated by Anthony Clare.
- 11 December Cyberville, cybernetics was first described by mathematician Norbert Wiener; Douglas Rushkoff, author of Cyberia; the English mathematician Alfred North Whitehead said it is the business of the future to be dangerous; Anne Friedberg; Robert Abel (animator); businessman Strauss Zelnick; artist Bill Barminski; Alexander Besher, author of the 1994 Rim; Lisa Palac, an editor of Future Sex. Narrated by Sean Pertwee, directed by Mike Wallington, produced by George Haggerty, made by Kai Productions
- 28 December Incredible Evidence, an Equinox Special about the limits of DNA profiling; on the evidence of a fingerprint, with 16 points of similarity, known as ridge detail, 35 year old miner, Neville Lee of Mansfield Woodhouse, was arrested on 21 August 1991 for the rape of an 11 year old girl on Sunday 4 August 1991, at Clumber Park caravan site in Nottinghamshire; when the real rapist confessed at Worksop Magistrates Court, on 16 September 1991, Neville Lee had lost his £20,000 job, been beaten up when on 28 days remand in HM Prison Lincoln, and his house vandalised, with all the windows broken; he was hoping to be re-employed by British Coal at Bevercotes Colliery; 23 year old Kristopher Hermann John Pohnert was jailed for life at Nottingham Court on 30 April 1992 for stripping an 11 year old girl naked, whipping her, and raping her; Pohnert had been to boarding school in Devon and Buckland School in Lymington, Hampshire; he told police 'I have a thing about spanking young children'. Directed by Hilary Lawson, made by TVF

=== 1995 ===
- 9 January Beyond Love, an Equinox Special about autoerotic asphyxia, which killed over 50 people in 1994; and due to the deeply, and distasteful, unconventional content of the programme, it was shown at 10pm; at the Johns Hopkins Sexual Disorders Clinic at the Johns Hopkins Bloomberg School of Public Health in Baltimore in Maryland, where chromosomal abnormality was found by Fred Berlin, often Klinefelter syndrome; Dr Raymond Goodman of Hope Hospital in Salford, now of the Institute of Brain, Behaviour and Mental Health at the University of Manchester, and why 90% of paraphiliacs were male; Peter Fenwick (neuropsychologist) of the Institute of Psychiatry, Psychology and Neuroscience, and how sexual arousal is centred in the limbic system; Gene Abel of the Behavioral Medicine Institute of Atlanta; William Marshall of the Queen's University at Kingston; Jeffrey Weeks (sociologist) at London South Bank University; John Bancroft (sexologist) of the MRC Reproductive Biology Unit in Edinburgh; Stephen Hucker of Queen's University, Ontario; John Money of Johns Hopkins Hospital; forensic psychologist Ronald Langevin. Narrated by Dame Jenni Murray, directed by Peter Boyd Maclean, produced by Simon Andreae, made by Optomen Television
- 27 August The Real X-Files: America's Psychic Spies, an Equinox Special about a former American military unit that conducted remote viewing, where operatives could see backwards and forwards in time; Admiral Stansfield Turner, Director from 1977 to 1981 of the CIA; Major-General Ed Thompson; Colonel John B. Alexander of the United States Army Intelligence and Security Command; Harold E. Puthoff, of SRI International in California; remote viewer Ingo Swann and the subsequent Stargate Project, at Fort Meade in Maryland; Keith Harary, who worked with Russell Targ. Narrated by Jim Schnabel, produced by Alex Graham, directed by Bill Eagles, made by Wall to Wall Television
- 3 September Cybersecrecy, the mathematician Fred Piper of the Information Security Group; the UK gave out Enigma machines to Commonwealth countries for secret telecommunications, without telling these countries that the UK could read every message; Phil Zimmermann, inventor of the PGP encryption algorithm; Simon Davies (privacy advocate); when at MIT in 1976, Whitfield Diffie found how to make encryption much more secure, to have public key encryption; Mark Rotenberg; Dorothy E. Denning, and criminal methods of encryption; Wayne Madsen (journalist); Ross J. Anderson of the Department of Computer Science and Technology, University of Cambridge and how the (French-designed) A5/1 encryption for the European mobile network in the 1990s had weak security; journalist Stephen Dorril; the NSA's Clipper chip; journalist James Bamford, author of The Puzzle Palace; a documentary in the style of Panorama. Produced by David Frank, directed by Martin Durkin, made by RDF Media
- 10 September Guru Busters investigates the activities of people in India who claim to have mystical powers. Producer and directed by Robert Eagle, narration by Art Malik, production company Eagle & Eagle.
- 17 September Jaws in the Med about swimming in the Mediterranean Sea; on Friday 20 July 1956 Royal Navy English teacher at Valletta Naval Technical School, forty-year-old Jack Smedley, went for a swim in St Thomas' Bay in Malta, when he was attacked by a great white shark, and never seen again; on 17 April 1987 a similar shark was landed by a fishing boat at Żurrieq in Malta, later researched by BBC weather presenter Ian Fergusson; board sailor José Luis Pérez-Díaz was attacked by a shark on 18 March 1986 at Tarifa in Andalusia, losing his foot; on Thursday 2 February 1989 scuba diver 47-year-old Luciano Constanzo was attacked by a 6-metre shark at Baratti in Tuscany, being the first shark attack in Italy for 27 years; sharks had been seen around Favignana, and its Mattanza; Franco Cigala-Fulgosi of the University of Parva; Giuseppe Notarbartolo di Sciara of the Tethys Research Institute, and how pollution from the Po (river) has damaged life in the Adriatic Sea. Narrated by Bob Peck, produced by Frances Berrigan, directed by Jeremy Taylor, made by Cicada Films with Discovery Communications
- 24 September Under Fire, about current firefighting technology; it was made coincide with National Fire Safety Week; the dangers such as flashover, when combustible gases ignite at the same time, sometimes explosively; it featured York fire station officer John Taylor, and Harrogate fireman Stephen Fairweather, who looked at fires in this country and Sweden; Sweden began training for flashovers in 1984, and no-one has been killed since through that. Commissioned by Discovery Europe, produced by Richard Melman.
- 1 October State of Weightlessness, cosmonauts talk about bowel movements and how prunes helped their constipation; the gruesome death, and crash site, of Vladimir Komarov in Soyuz 1 in April 1967; the return of Soyuz 11 in June 1971; with Gherman Titov, the second cosmonaut to orbit the Earth in Vostok 2 in August 1961; Konstantin Feoktistov who flew on Voskhod 1 in October 1964; Georgy Grechko; Vitaly Zholobov who flew on Soyuz 21 in 1976; Vladimir Solovyov (cosmonaut); Aleksandr Laveykin, who flew in Soyuz TM-2 in 1987, with half a year in orbit; Valeri Polyakov, a medical doctor, who holds the record for the longest time in orbit of 14 months after launch on Soyuz TM-18 in January 1994; Vera, the wife of Viktor Patsayev; medical doctors Oleg Gazenko, Anatoly Grigoriev. Originally a Russian production, all in Russian with subtitles, produced by Maciej Drygas
- 15 October High Anxiety, about lifts and the required extensive technology of tall office buildings; Canary Wharf Tower (One Canada Square) had 50 floors with 36 lifts, which could travel up to 13.5 mph; Jim Fortune of Lerch Bates; novelist Philip Kerr; Otis Elevators alarm response centre of Farmington, Connecticut, which dealt with trapped passengers - it took about 20 minutes to rescue people; the Otis Test Tower, at Bristol in Connecticut, which had 29 floors and 11 lifts; architect Ken Yeang of Malaysia, known for his tall buildings; Gary Faltin of Otis; in the distant past, due to ropes, only goods were carried by lifts; in 1853 Elisha Otis invented a safety system for lifts, via a governor cable; only once have steel lift cables snapped, on 28 July 1945, in the 1945 Empire State Building B-25 crash after being lost in fog, severing the lift governor cable; if the cable snapped, due to the lift being balanced only after about nine people were in a lift, the lift would go upwards; on 12 August 1995, in the Empire State Building, a lift did go upwards, to be trapped at the 80th floor; the Woolworth Building, with 57 floors and 26 lifts, which could travel up to 10 mph - it was the world's tallest building from 1911 to 1930; engineer William Sheeran of Otis; medical doctor Rollin Stott, of the Linear Motion Laboratory of the Defence Research Agency (DERA) Centre for Human Sciences in north-east Hampshire; the feelings in the stomach, often sensed in a lift, comes from a pulse of adrenaline; Convent of Sacred Heart, with six floors; Nicole Fenchel was phobic of lifts; Doreen Powell of White Plains Hospital; the express lift, for the observation platform, in Tower 2 of the former World Trade Center had a journey time of 58 seconds; the former WTC had the world's second and third tallest office buildings; Tower 1 had 110 floors, being 417 metres high, with 96 lifts that could travel up to 15 mph; 70,000 people worked in the former WTC; people should not have to wait for a lift for no more than 30 seconds; Roger Howkins of Arup in London; 200 Vesey Street, known as Three World Financial Center, with 51 floors and 39 lifts, that could travel up to 14 mph; the former WTC was the first building to introduce the sky lobby design, with interspersed lifts; Robert DiChiara, assistant director of the former WTC; engineer Bruce Powell of Otis; Argentine architect, César Pelli, who designed One Canada Square of Canary Wharf; control systems of lifts anticipated demand; but there was a dark and menacing side to travel by lifts - Detectives Kevin Dineen and Lisa McClean of the NYPD Elevator Squad, at Carver Houses in the East Village, Manhattan, and how criminals could isolate victims; local youths and children would travel on top of the elevators for momentary thrills; the New York Marriott Marquis hotel, with 49 floors and 12 elevators, which could travel up to 15 mph; the Petronas Towers in Malaysia, with 88 floors, and 76 lifts, that could travel up to 16 mph, to be completed by 1997; lift ropes could go up to 600 metres, at the extreme most; new lifts would be powered by tubular linear motors or AC induction motors; 600 lifts with these new motors were operating in Japan; Yebisu Garden Place in Ebisu, Shibuya in Tokyo, where linear motors powered the lift counterweight; the Nishi-Shinjuku district in Shinjuku, Tokyo; many tall buildings were being built in Japan; Riverside Sumida Center, of Tokyo, built in 1994; the Yokohama Landmark Tower, with 70 floors, in Japan, built in 1993; Mitsubishi Electric had the world's fastest lifts, up to 28 mph; Junichi Sato of Mitsubishi, who said that he thought that Japanese people valued well-made products, and only trusted manufacturers too, whereas he thought that Americans and Europeans merely wanted functional products, whether good or not; the proposed enormous 800 metre Millennium Tower (Tokyo) for Tokyo Bay, with 150 floors, which was never built, but the Gherkin (30 St Mary Axe) was built instead; architect Andrew Miller of Foster Asia; there were twenty buildings over 60 floors being built; the Chinese economy was growing by 15% per year, and was Mitsubishi's biggest customer; the Century Tower (Tokyo), built in 1991, with 21 floors, with 14 lifts, that could travel up to 11 mph; lift technology had allowed Western business to prosper, but now it was superfluous for Western business. Narrated by Paul McGann, produced by Elizabeth Allen, directed by Gary Johnstone, made by Diverse Productions
- 22 October DNA in the Dock, an Equinox Special that was an update on the Incredible Evidence episode on 28 December 1994; The murder of 15-year-old Claire Hood, last seen on 19 January 1995, where 2,100 men had their DNA tested; her body was found in Cath Cobb Woods the next day; Sir Alec Jeffreys claimed that he could tell anyone apart; Timothy Wilson Spencer was the first person to be executed, with DNA evidence, on 27 April 1994, having committed murder in 1988; DCI Stuart Lewis, who worked on the Claire Hood investigation, who believed that her killer lived nearby - her killer lived 100 yards away; the United Kingdom National DNA Database began earlier in 1995, and in six months, 60,000 DNA specimens were recorded, and the database was intended to have 5 million specimens; an investigation of Orchid Cellmark, part of ICI, found that errors in correlation of specimens were made; California police gave test specimens to Cellmark, and errors were found, which Cellmark attributed to cross-contamination; Donald Findlay and a Scottish rape investigation in Largs, North Ayrshire, in 1987; former policeman Brian Kelly, and his wrongful conviction, for six years, serving four of them, for rape on 30 November 1989, through DNA evidence alone - DNA testing would later change in 1990, where crime scene DNA specimens were kept apart; Kary Mullis, who invented the PCR test in 1983, receiving the 1993 Nobel Prize in Chemistry, and knew about errors in DNA genetic testing; David Werrett of the Forensic Science Service, who set up the UK national DNA database in Birmingham, which deployed the PCR method - the more reliable Second Generation Multiplex Plus would be later introduced in 1999; Don Dovaston, later the deputy chief of Derbyshire Constabulary, which was the first police force to identify suspects through the UK DNA database; the Metropolitan Police had its own DNA database; Larry Mueller, population geneticist at the UCI School of Biological Sciences. Produced by David Poyser, directed by Hilary Lawson, made by TVF
- 5 November Kaboom!, the explosives engineer Sidney Alford; Controlled Demolition, Inc., founded by Jack Loizeaux; Rev Ron Lancaster, originally from Huddersfield, who founded Kimbolton Fireworks in 1964, when a chemistry teacher at Kimbolton School; in 1847 Ascanio Sobrero of Italy discovered nitroglycerin - nitroglycerin is the main component of dynamite; a detonation occurs at supersonic speed; Semtex was developed in Czechoslovakia in the 1960s; Ballistite, made from nitroglycerin and discovered in 1887, is the propellant for guns. Joint-production with NOVA and WGBH. Shown on Nova on 14 January 1997
- 12 November Avalanche, avalanches kill around two hundred people a year, with 120 of those in the Alps; Swiss physicist Othmar Buser of the Swiss Federal Institute for Forest, Snow and Landscape Research (WSL), who developed a database of avalanches; Bruce Tremper; Doug Fesler; powder snow avalanches can reach 150 mph; Laurent Buisson. Narrated by Heather Couper, made by Pioneer Productions with Discovery Networks
- 19 November God only Knows, about how some physicists see theology being explained through physics, such as Frank J. Tipler of Tulane University and his book The Physics of Immortality; George Johnson (writer) and book titles; Lewis Wolpert and how there was no evidence for God in the external world; David Finley of the National Radio Astronomy Observatory; religious writer Karen Armstrong, author of A History of God; Brazilian physicist Marcelo Gleiser; physicist Leon M. Lederman; Russell Stannard and physics before the big bang; the KTeV experiment at Fermilab, which looked at kaons, and Vivian O'Dell; Rev John Polkinghorne, former professor of Mathematical Physics at the University of Cambridge. Narrated by Bill Paterson, produced by Nicolas Kent, directed by Peter Webber
- 26 November Gloria's Toxic Death, about the death of Gloria Ramirez in California on 19 February 1994; a nurse, who took a blood sample from her, passed out from inhaling an unknown vapour coming from the blood sample; few episodes of Doctor Who had such a bizarre and unbelievable storyline; blood tests from the nurses revealed a lowering of the enzyme cholinesterase, which in other cases is linked to organophosphate poisoning; the Lawrence Livermore National Laboratory proposed a connection to dimethyl sulfoxide (DMSO) that had combined with oxygen given in the hospital to make dimethyl sulfate; the conditions of the hospital were repeated in a test, and the results underwent gas chromatography–mass spectrometry by Yolanda de Miguel at Department of Chemistry, Imperial College London. Narrated by Neil Pearson, directed by Tim Shawcross, produced by Geoff Deehan, made by Union Pictures with Discovery Communications
- 3 December On Jupiter, about the large gravitational effect that Jupiter has on the solar system; if the mass of Jupiter was thirty times bigger, the heat in its centre could sustain nuclear reactions, and it could become a star, maybe a brown dwarf; Gene Shoemaker of the Lowell Observatory and Palomar Observatory; Galileo Galilei discovered Jupiter's moons, Io, Europa, Ganymede (the largest moon in the solar system), and Callisto, on 7 January 1610; Heidi Hammel of MIT; Galileo (spacecraft), built at JPL and Ames in the 1980s, being planned to have launched in 1982, arrived at Jupiter on 7 December 1995; Torrence Johnson of JPL; Jim Scotti of the Spacewatch project at Kitt Peak National Observatory; Brian G. Marsden of the Central Bureau for Astronomical Telegrams; Vicki Meadows of the Anglo-Australian Telescope; Imke de Pater of the W. M. Keck Observatory on Mauna Kea; David Morrison (astrophysicist) of NASA Ames. Narrated by John Hurt, directed by Richard Smith, made by Pioneer Productions and the Discovery Channel
- 10 December Designing Dream Machines, about product innovation and product design of food processors and a reinvented motorbike by the Seymour-Powell design agency and its designer Nick Talbot, with the management team of Tefal UK and its managing director and a design by 43-year-old Dick Powell, and a possible new design of the ubiquitous 125CC BSA Bantam motorbike for MZ Motorrad- und Zweiradwerk of Germany by 42-year-old Richard Seymour; the 59 Club; Leigh Martin of the defunct Comet (closed in December 2012). Narrated by Marilyn Milgrom, directed by Richard Burke, produced by Richard Reisz. TV6 went on to make the six-part series Better by Design
- 17 December It Runs on Water, about the field commonly known as fringe science, where physicist Frank Close was sceptical if not broadly dismissive, stating that 300 years of science could not be overruled, but a professor of Aeronautics Paul Csysz of Saint Louis University mentioned that he thought some people in science were often unquestioning of their lifelong-held beliefs, and nervous of anyone trying to do so; an invention in Moscow was looked at by American electrical engineer and parapsychologist Harold E. Puthoff; Stanley Meyer's water fuel cell; NASA's propulsion research at Lewis Research Center in Cleveland, Ohio; it ends with Sir Arthur C. Clarke and Requiem (Mozart). Directed by Lawrence Simanowitz, produced and narrated by William Woollard, made by InCA Productions with Discovery Communications
- 20 December Do Vampire Bats have Friends?, an Equinox Special about whether animals have consciousness; zoologist Prof John Krebs, Baron Krebs, and whether animals had human-like sentience; biologist Gerald Wilkinson of the University of Maryland, and research, over five years, into relationships of vampire bats with other types of animals, and found food sharing between hungry vampire bats; zoologist Miriam Rothschild; psychologist Cecilia Heyes of UCL and self-perception of chimpanzees; zoologist Bernd Heinrich of the University of Vermont, and puzzle-solving of raven birds; zoologist Benjamin Beck of The National Zoo, and the apparent deployment of tools by animals; Ian Farquhar, and foxhunting, and whether foxes realise their predicament, and the Duke of Beaufort's Hunt in Gloucestershire; biologist Sir Patrick Bateson of the University of Cambridge, sensation of pain in animals, and the Animals (Scientific Procedures) Act 1986, which defined protected animals, that did not cover the octopus, but due to research by the Universities Federation for Animal Welfare (UFAW); Prof Peter Boyle and Martin Wells, and a 1993 amendment added the octopus; Prof Daniel Dennett of Tufts University, and how snakes think; psychologist Irene Pepper berg, of the University of Arizona, and an African Grey parrot called Alex, who has been talking for 18 years; the horse Clever Hans; Robert Seyfarth (scientist) and Dorothy Cheney (scientist), and their work on baboon warning calls and grunts, in Kenya. Narrated by Andrew Sachs, directed by Christopher Sykes, made by Christopher Sykes Productions

=== 1996 ===
- 8 September The Mystery of the Cocaine Mummies, about pre-Columbian transoceanic contact theories; German toxicologist Svetlana Balabanova made a discovery in a Munich museum; Svetlana, of the Institute of Forensic Science in Ulm, had invented tests for substances in hair and sweat; people did not believe her; toxicologist John Henry of Guy's Hospital; Egyptologist Ann Rosalie David made independent tests at Manchester Museum; Alfred Grimm of the Egyptian Museum in Munich - Staatliche Sammlung für Ägyptische Kunst; Karnak in Egypt; a French TF1 broadcast in 1981; Michelle Lescot of the National Museum of Natural History, France; Nasri Iskander, chief curator of the Egyptian Museum in Cairo; botanist Sandy Knapp of the Natural History Museum, London; John Baines (Egyptologist); anthropologist Alice Beck Kehoe of Marquette University, and early transatlantic ocean crossings; Martin Bernal of Cornell University. Narrated by Robin Ellis, produced by Hilary Lawson, directed by Sarah Marris, made by TVF
- 15 September The Great Leveller, about psychosomatic medicine, and how work affects our health, and research on health equity carried out by Richard G. Wilkinson, who later wrote the book The Spirit Level, an economic historian from the University of Sussex who believed that societies with large differences in income would often cause less sense of togetherness; much data came from the longitudinal Whitehall Study at UCL; high-density lipoprotein (HDL) variation, found by Eric Brunner (epidemiologist) of UCL; Sir Richard Way; fibrinogen variation, found by Prof Sam Machin, haematologist at University College Hospital; Robert Sapolsky and his work with baboons in the Serengeti National Park showing HDL variation; how cortisol affected long-term health; atherosclerosis in Macacque monkeys and Carol Shiveley of Bowman Gray School of Medicine (since 2011 the Wake Forest School of Medicine) in North Carolina; health in Hungary since the Hungarian Revolution of 1956, and health of the UK during the Blitz; the Roseto effect found in Roseto, Pennsylvania by Stewart Wolf of the University of Oklahoma. Narrated by Bill Paterson, directed by Paul Sen, produced by Rosalind Arden, made by McDougall Craig
- 22 September Non-lethal Weapon, about non-lethal weapons; Steven Metz of the US Army War College; Ride of the Valkyries with sticky foam guns; a net gun made by Foster-Miller; sonic weapons; Jonathan Rosenhead of the LSE; seventeen people had been killed by plastic bullets in Northern Ireland; Lenore Anderson; in the Gulf War air campaign of 1991, Tomahawk missiles discharged BLU-114/B wire over Iraq electrical substations, and crippled 85% of the country's electrical network, so effectively switching off the country's air defence radar; Julian Perry Robinson of the Science Policy Research Unit at the University of Sussex. Produced by David Frank, directed by Martin Durkin, made by RDF Television with Discovery Communications

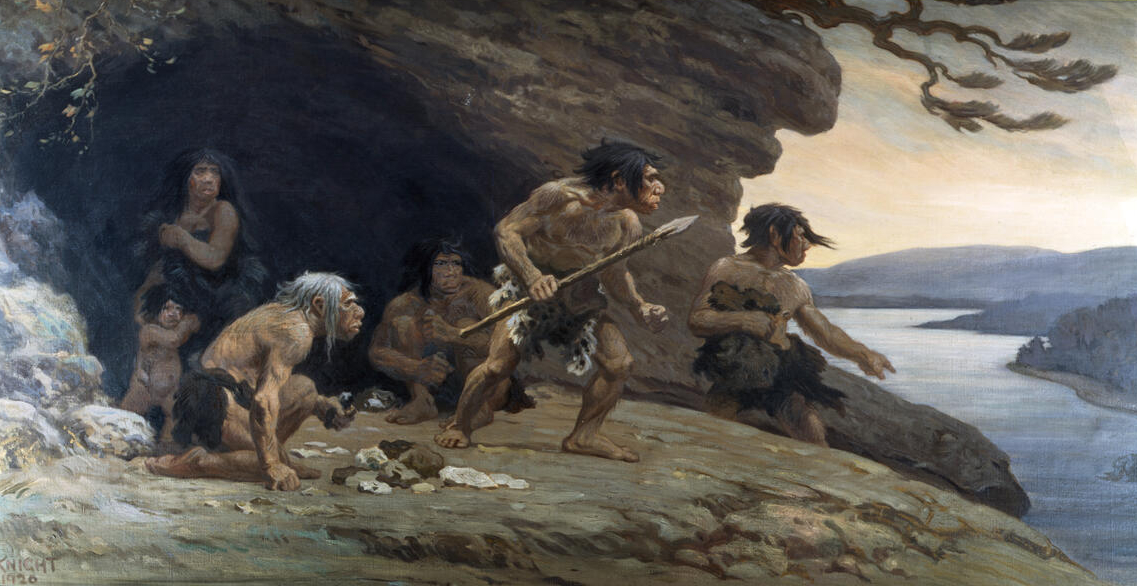
A 1920 painting of Neanderthals

- 29 September Last Neanderthal?, the unanswered question of the Neanderthal extinction, with Sir Paul Mellars of the University of Cambridge; Pat Shipman of Penn State University; science writer James Shreeve; anthropologist Randall White of New York University; the first complete skeleton was found in 1908 and given to Marcellin Boule; Milford H. Wolpoff, anthropologist of the University of Michigan; John Shea (archaeologist), anthropologist of Stony Brook University; Lewis Binford, anthropologist of Southern Methodist University in Texas; Neanderthals are thought to have lived similar unevolved uncultured lives for 200,000 years; Brigitte Delluc of Abri Pataud; in the 1980s, a completely new paradigm was thought up by British anthropologist Chris Stringer whereby a new group originated about 200,000 years ago, replacing the former human evolution, known as recent African origin of modern humans, but this paradigm was countered by Milford Wolpoff and his multiregional origin of modern humans, arguing that Neanderthals hadn't died out; Dorothy Garrod, the first female professor at the University of Cambridge in 1939 - the Disney Professor of Archaeology, completed important research in the middle East on how Neanderthals would have encountered much more culturally advanced modern humans in that region; archaeologist Ofer Bar-Yosef described how radiocarbon dating does not work beyond 50,000 years, and modern humans were found there at least 100,000 years ago; the dating methods remained in dispute until reliable genetic ancestry methods arrived in the late 1980s, with Mark Stoneking, a molecular anthropologist of Penn State University, who introduced the Mitochondrial Eve theory in 1987; geneticist Kenneth Kidd and how genetic data had superseded much of the anthropological research, which had been inherently unreliable due to not enough solid data; essentially Neanderthals died out possibly due to insufficient language ability, and were less able in overall cognitive planning. Directed by Lawrence Simanowitz, narrated and produced by William Woollard, made by InCA Productions
- 6 October Staying Alive, survivors of terrible accidents speak, with Sylvia Chapell of the August 1985 British Airtours Flight 28M; Paul Barney of the September 1994 Sinking of the MS Estonia; survival cognitive psychologist John Leach of Lancaster University; Robert Sapolsky, a neuroendocrinologist, on how glucocorticoids are secreted; Jeffrey Alan Gray, Professor of Psychology at the Institute of Psychiatry, Psychology and Neuroscience; the 336th Training Group at Fairchild Air Force Base; medical researchers at DRDC Toronto; the October 1991 Operation Boxtop 435 Transport and Rescue Squadron from CFB Trenton Hercules crash, which resulted in the 1993 film Ordeal in the Arctic; the brain neurotransmitters affect survival outcomes, controlled by the enzyme monoamine oxidase; Helicopter Underwater Escape Training at Survival Systems in Dartmouth, Nova Scotia. Narrated by Bill Paterson, the consultant was Edward Bullmore, directed by Denman Rooke, produced by Adam Bullmore, made by October Films
- 13 October Killer Bees, about a catastrophic genetic experiment in southern Brazil in the late 1950s - the Africanized bee; the East African lowland honey bee was introduced in 1956 by Warwick Estevam Kerr; the bees were introduced to help the honey industry, instead the new bees killed off the native bees, as well as many people too, with bees terrorising Apache Junction, Arizona; one swarm of thousand led to 20,000 other swarms in one year; the bees have killed over 600 people; a climber in Costa Rica disturbed a swarm, and received 8,000 stings, killing him. Directed by Martin Gorst, made by Windfall Films
- 27 October Double Identity, largely about the nature versus nurture argument, as opposed to the less-scientific tabula rasa argument; the Twins Days annual festival held in Twinsburg, Ohio; the heritability of IQ and Robert Plomin of the Institute of Psychiatry, Psychology and Neuroscience at King's College London; Nick Martin of the Queensland Institute of Medical Research; 75% of intelligence is genetic from twin studies, and David T. Lykken of the University of Minnesota; vanishing twins; Neil Sebire of King's College Hospital and Alessandra Piontelli of the University of Milan; country music The LeGarde Twins; Dorothy V. M. Bishop of the University of Cambridge; heritability of IQ and Peter Conrad (sociologist) of Brandeis University; the Louisville Twin Study at the University of Louisville in Kentucky, which also found the Scarr–Rowe effect. Narrated by Jenni Murray, directed by Selina Macnair, produced by Amanda Theunissen, made by Fulcrum Productions West
- 3 November Identified Flying Objects, about Marfa, Texas and the Marfa lights, and other earthquake lights; Paul Devereux and computer scientist Erling Strand, of Østfold University College and Project Hessdalen, visits the Min Min lights in Australia in 1995; Paul Devereux investigated lights that had been seen at Llanegryn in 1904, which followed the Mochras geological fault; there had been seismic activity at the time which had culminated in the 1906 Swansea earthquake; lights had been seen at Toppenish ridge in the US, in the Cascade Mountains, which had a thrust fault; geologist Peter Sammonds at the UCL Department of Earth Sciences; geophysicist Jim Byerlee, known for Byerlee's law; Mexican television presenter Jaime Maussan; the Popocatépetl volcano in Mexico. Narrated by David Jessel, directed by Chris Hale, made by Real World Pictures, with the Discovery Channel
- 10 November What's in a Number?, poetry by Lavinia Greenlaw, with dyscalculia which is connected to the parietal lobe and Prof Brian Butterworth of UCL Neuroscience; the artist Sir Michael Craig-Martin; a 1950s educational film about pi made by Coronet Films; the Chudnovsky brothers; fractals come from plotting on a graph imaginary numbers against real numbers and have self-similarity, and Ian Stewart of the University of Warwick; Steven Weinberg of the University of Texas at Austin. Directed by Edmund Coulthard, produced by Duncan Dallas, who founded Café Scientifique in 1998, made by XYTV
- 24 November The Men with Nine Lives, about the British Army bomb disposal course, with 321 EOD Squadron RLC and the Army School of Ammunition (now the Defence Explosive Ordnance Disposal, Munitions and Search Training Regiment); twenty British Army bomb disposal personnel were killed defusing bombs in Northern Ireland; early IRA explosives were in tin cans filled with nails; 42-year-old Shane O'Doherty, a former IRA operative, who received thirty life sentences in 1974 for letter bombs; IRA personnel called themselves 'explosive operatives'; the IRA moved on to bombs in mail packages, triggered by tilt switches, and on to much-bigger car bombs; Lieutenant-Colonel Peter Miller invented a remote-control mechanical device that could set off a controlled explosion, so disabling most of the bomb components; projected water disruptors could remove explosive devices under vehicles; the IRA put car explosive devices inside a half of a beer keg; letter bombs would contain three to four ounces of semtex (mostly pentaerythritol tetranitrate); the Downing Street mortar attack of 7 February 1991; the hostage bomb; the IRA would lure army bomb disposal personnel, and metal-detectors would find how the IRA had lured army personnel; south Armagh, controlled by the Provisional IRA South Armagh Brigade was the most-dangerous part of Northern Ireland, and all army personnel travelled on operations only by helicopter. Directed by David Dugan, made by Windfall Films. Shown on Nova on 21 October 1997 as Bomb Squad
- 1 December Day Return to Space about the new proposals for craft; in 1995, NASA proposed the X-33, chosen on 2 July 1996, to fly by March 1999; Daniel Goldin, head of NASA from 1992 to 2001; Saturn from The Planets; The Blue Danube; the McDonnell Douglas DC-X; Maxwell Hunter; Jupiter from The Planets; Hans Mark of NASA; David Urie and Paul Landry; the Rutan Voyager, which flew around the world without refuelling; the aerospike engine; the Ansari X Prize and the EAA AirVenture Oshkosh air show; Mitchell Burnside Clapp; Gary Hudson, Bevin McKinney, and their Rotary Rocket (Roton); Steve Bennett and his Starchaser Industries. Narrated, similarly to the Adam Curtis series, by Jack Fortune, produced by Richard Reisz, directed by Stephen White, made by TV6
- 8 December Superhighway Robbery, about 26-year-old Russian computer programmer Vladimir Levin and computer hacking, who was caught when he arrived at Stansted Airport in March 1995 (he was trying to evade extradition to the US, but failed and was extradited in September 1997; an average bank robbery took $1900, but was prosecuted around 82%, a robbery via computer took around $250,000 and prosecution was around 2%; Willie Sutton and his Sutton's law. Narrated by Robin Ellis, directed by Patrick Forbes, produced by Jenny Crowther, made by Hart Ryan.
- 15 December Dr Satan's Robot, it refers to the film Mysterious Doctor Satan; it shows surgeon Robert J. White and his many macabre experiments on animals; the documentary would have not been appointment viewing for supporters of PETA; John Frankenheimer, director of the film Island of Dr Moreau; Terry Gilliam and his film Twelve Monkeys; the film The City of Lost Children; novelist Michael Marshall Smith, and his novel Spares; Cold Lazarus by Dennis Potter; Conservative MP for Birmingham Edgbaston, Jill Knight, and her disagreements with Roger Gosden; John Gillott; film director John Carpenter; David King, and disagreements with Robert Plomin, which led to his MRC funding being withheld; James Wilson (scientist) of the Perelman School of Medicine at the University of Pennsylvania; Julliet Tizzard of the Progress Trust. Narrated by Seán Barrett (actor), produced by Cathy Rogers, directed by Martin Durkin, made by RDF Television, with the Learning Channel

=== 1997 ===
- 24 August Secrets of the Super Psychics, about Uri Geller and others, made by Open Media
- 8 September Black Holes, astronomer Phil Charles; the Japanese Ginga (satellite) and V404 Cygni, which orbits a black hole; the William Herschel Telescope in La Palma; Woolsthorpe Manor, south of Grantham, where over 18 months in 1665, Newton deduced the laws of physics; Sir Martin Rees, the Astronomer Royal; vicar John Michell of Thornhill, West Yorkshire; physicist Kip Thorne of Caltech, who made a bet with Stephen Hawking in 1997 - the Thorne–Hawking–Preskill bet; Igor Dmitriyevich Novikov of the Theoretical Astrophysics Center of the University of Copenhagen; Sir Roger Penrose; the Magellanic Clouds are the nearest neighbouring galaxy; the radio galaxy Messier 87 looked at by the Array Operations Center of the National Radio Astronomy Observatory at Sorroco, New Mexico - in March 2021, this would be the first black hole to be photographed, by the Event Horizon Telescope. Narrated by John Hurt, produced by Heather Couper, directed by Richard Smith, made by Pioneer Film And Television Productions, with ABC of Australia and the Discovery Channel. Won the Banff best Popular Science award
- 15 September A Very British Bomb, with interviews with Eddie Howse and John Challens who worked with William Penney at Fort Halstead; Dennis Ginns, reactor design engineer; featured Christopher Hinton (of ICI); Harold Disney of supply; Hinton decided to build the plant at Windscale; Sir John Hill worked on a computer; Tom Tuohy managed the piles; David Deverell was a senior chemical engineer; the core would be made at the new site of Aldermaston, a former RAF airfield; Air Marshal Sir John Rowlands took the two plutonium cores on an Avro Lincoln; Bill Hall, later Professor of Nuclear Engineering from 1959 at the University of Manchester; scientists travelled to Australia on HMS Campania (D48). Narrated by Jonathan Cullen, produced by Andy Paterson, directed by Patrick Forbes
- 22 September Fighting the G-Force, it looked at the Brooks Air Force Base in Texas; F-16 aircraft of the United States Air Force Thunderbirds; a G-force simulator on 30 May 1997, where a pilot experiences G-LOC; Major Mark Arlinghaus of the Thunderbirds; Captain Rick Forster, an F-16 instructor; Luke Air Force Base in Arizona, where F-16 pilots were trained; Major Rob Kesterson, an instructor with the 62nd Fighter Squadron; Lt Toby Brallier of the 62nd Fighter Squadron, who blacked out, but he was in a two-seat F-16 trainer; Holloman Air Force Base in New Mexico, where all USAF pilots learn about G-LOC, and are medically tested; Captain John Condojani and G-suits; a G-force centrifuge, rotating once every two seconds; pilots referred to G-LOC as 'doing the funky chicken'; to fly in an A-10, a pilot had to cope with 7.5G, and there were no exceptions; F-16 pilots had to cope with 9G; Captain Rick Fofi, a physical training officer with the USAF; women had been allowed to fly USAF fighter aircraft since 1993; Dr William Albery, chief of USAF aerospace medical research; Colonel James Dooley of flight motion effects at Brooks AFB in Texas, in the Armstrong Laboratory, named after Harry George Armstrong, known for the Armstrong limit; taller pilots were more susceptible to G-LOC; when the German Air Force inherited East German pilots, it discovered that the East German air force believed that G-LOC could be prevented by ruthless selection of pilots and better fitness preparation; Wing Commander Andreas Valentiner of the Luftwaffe Institute of Aviation Medicine; the German Air Force decided to ruthlessly select pilots by G-LOC in a centrifuge as well, before any training commenced - it was the only NATO air force to do this; Dr Brendan Godfrey, director of the Armstrong Laboratory; Captain Kelly Greene of Wright-Patterson Air Force Base in Ohio; Colonel Ron Hill, head of the Crew Systems Directorate; Finley Barfield, chief engineer of the F-16, and what became the Automatic Ground Collision Avoidance System, to avoid controlled flight into terrain (CFIT); Dr Paul Werchan of Brooks AFB; Dr Gene McCall of the United States Air Force Scientific Advisory Board; the Northrop Grumman RQ-4 Global Hawk, planned to first fly in late 1997. Narrated by Piers Gibbon, produced by Simon Berthon, directed by Mark Rubens, made by 3BM Television with The Learning Channel (TLC)
- 29 September The Iceberg Cometh, about the dangers of icebergs in the Atlantic Ocean; for every metre above surface, four metres are below; the icebergs are made of snow that fell half a million years ago; Greenland is as large as western Europe; icebergs can travel thirty miles a day; the International Ice Patrol was formed in 1914, and now checks half a million square miles; patrols take place three times a week from March to July in the Atlantic Marine Ecozone; glaciologist Peter Wadhams of the University of Cambridge; the North Greenland Ice Core Project (NGRIP) began in 1995. Produced by David Frank, directed by Cathy Rogers, made by RDF Television with the Discovery Channel
- 13 October Coma, on 4 June 1996 a 32-year-old woman was beaten unconscious in New York Central Park; she was one of four women beaten by 22-year-old John Royster, with the last, 62-year-old Evelyn Alvarez on Park Avenue, not surviving, and Royster was caught from a fingerprint, and was sentenced to life without parole in 1998; neurosurgeon Jamshid Ghajar; the Jamaica Hospital Medical Center, where a nine year old boy, Alex, had been hit by a car, and had severe head trauma, and had a head CT scan; the 'second accident' in the first week in hospital, where the brain swelled, and blocked the flow of blood; a tube was inserted into the brain, to release fluid from swelling, known as a ventriculostomy; the New York Hospital Pediatric ICU, now the Weill Cornell Medical Center; on day two, the eye pupils began to dilate, which can indicate brain swelling, and the intracranial pressure increased, until day three: by day twenty, Alex began to show greater responses, and by day 39, he was walking, and will make a good recovery; neurosurgeon Randall Chesnut, of Oregon, now at the University of Washington School of Medicine; Nicole Ward had a car accident, with a brain injury, but makes a good recovery, thanks to the ventriculostomy procedure; the International Conference on Recent Advances in Neurotraumatology (ICRAN) in early September 1996 at the University of Bologna in Rimini in north-east Italy, where new guidelines of the American Academy of Neurology would be disseminated, from work by the Colorado Medical Society in 1991. A US production, narrated by Piers Gibbon, produced by Paula Apsell, directed by Linda Garmon, made by Nova and WGBH. Shown on Nova on 7 October 1997
- 20 October Superhighway Robbery, an updated repeat
- 27 October Sun Storm, about geomagnetic storms, with Nicola Fox of the Heliophysics Science Division; Mike Lockwood (physicist); the March 1989 geomagnetic storm and Hydro-Québec's electricity transmission system; Telesat of Ottawa, and the High Altitude Observatory; a warning system for geomagnetic storms, the Cluster satellite network, was to be launched on 4 June 1996 on board Ariane flight V88, but the launch was a disaster; historical solar records at the Armagh Observatory showed how weather fluctuated with solar activity over the years, John Butler found a connection with Earth temperature; Brian Tinsley looked at electrical charge in clouds causing rain, found by aircraft of the National Center for Atmospheric Research (NCAR); Ernest Hildner of the Space Weather Prediction Center; North American Aerospace Defense Command (NORAD); Daniel N. Baker of the Laboratory for Atmospheric and Space Physics; the Advanced Composition Explorer, launched in August 1997, would detect the magnetic polarity of any solar winds. Narrated by Robin Ellis, directed by Dan Chambers, produced by Robert Eagle, made by Eagle & Eagle
- 3 November Natural Born Genius?, about inherited intelligence; the population geneticist Robert Plomin, who came to London in 1994; bioethicist Jonathan Glover; psychologist Camilla Benbow of Iowa State University, and the Study of Mathematically Precocious Youth; statistician Charles Spearman was the first to conduct research into general intelligence in 1904, and found that schoolchildren who were good at one academic subject were also good at other subjects and vice versa, and invented the term g factor (psychometrics), although Francis Galton had briefly looked at the subject; psychologist Ian Deary of the University of Edinburgh, where much research on intelligence has been conducted; Alfred Binet of France invented the intelligence test, so that low-scoring children could be given extra help; cognitive psychologist Michael Howe of the University of Exeter believed that the 11-plus exams in England, for grammar school entrance, could possibly label children; much educational testing took place in the US, as the government believed in it, by the Educational Testing Service (ETS); psychologist Stephen J. Ceci disputed reading cast-iron outcomes of individual intelligence tests, but nonetheless believed that general intelligence could be predicted across a population as a whole; Chris Allander of the Army School of Recruiting; Michael Howe conducted environmental education research of parental support, and if that was as much a factor as genetic or innate ability - environmental educational research largely ignored any genetic component, which Robert Plomin dismissed; psychologist Sandra Scarr had conducted much research on adopted children, which largely and conclusively proved the case for genetically inherited intelligence and abilities - and she believed that you could only teach subjects to children of whom had enough capability; Robert Plomin's wife, psychologist Judith Dunn, and varying intelligence of children within individual families; identical twins raised apart had identical IQ scores; psychologist Thalia C. Eley of the Institute of Psychiatry, Psychology and Neuroscience; from Robert Plomin's exhaustive adoption genetic studies, he finds a genetic link. Narrated by Barbara Flynn, produced by Rosalind Arden, directed by David Cresswell, made by John Gau Productions. John Gau had made Triumph of the Nerds the year before
- 10 November Losing It, about the persistence of sportspeople in the face of adversity; Steve Backley, javelin thrower gained three world records and was European champion in 1990 at the age of 21, but at the 1991 World Championships in Athletics in Tokyo, he didn't get past the qualifying round, where he had to throw 82m but he could only manage 78m; a fortnight later he threw 91m, gaining the British and Commonwealth records; mental strength is often the difference between success and failure; Doug Sanders, the American golfer, missed a straightforward put at the 1970 British Open; Sally Gunnell at the 1992 Olympics; sports psychologist Dave Collins (a former Royal Marine); footballer Lee Chapman who suffered a loss of confidence in 1982; Sally Gunnell, despite feeling intensely nervous before the final on 19 August of the 1993 World Championships in Athletics in Stuttgart, came first and broke the world record; Scottish golfer Sam Torrance and mental preparation for the zone; cricketer Michael Atherton; tennis player Mark Cox; neuroscientist Susan Greenfield, Baroness Greenfield, and alpha waves or alpha rhythm; banishing negative thoughts; Paul Holmes, sports psychologist of the Great Britain Pistol Squad (run by British Shooting since 2007); total mental absorption, denoted by alpha wave brain activity on an ECG, appeared to strongly help success; psychologist David Milner. Narrated by sports commentator Brian Moore, produced by Geoff Deehan, made by Union Pictures
- 17 November The Day the Earth Was Hit, the Tunguska event on 30 June 1908; David Morrison (astrophysicist) of NASA Ames; Duncan Steel of The Spaceguard Foundation; physicist Edward Teller; Russian mineralogist Leonid Kulik lead the investigation in 1927; the Tunguska explosion had the strength of a 15 megatonne nuclear explosion; astrophysicist Victor Clube and Bill Napier of Armagh Observatory; scientists from Tomsk State University visit Vanavara (rural locality) in the Siberian summer; the 1945 nuclear explosions had similarities in explosive effect to the Tunguska event; Benny Peiser; the Beta Taurids meteor shower; geochemist Evgeny Kolesnikov of Moscow University; tests at Sandia National Laboratories by Mark Boslough; astronomer Eleanor F. Helin of JPL, who worked on the Near-Earth Asteroid Tracking programme. Narrated by Anthony Hyde, produced by Simon Welfare, directed by Stephen White, made by Granite Productions
- 24 November When Pigs Ruled the World, about the species that survived the extinction event 250 million years ago, to give rise to mammals; Roger Smith of the South African Museum in the Karroo desert; Scottish paleontologist Mike Benton of the University of Bristol; Peter Ward (paleontologist) of the University of Washington; around 1977 a farmer found a strange footprint, made by a therapsid, the ancestor of mammals, in the Guadalupian part of the middle Permian; biologist Colin Tudge, and how large genetic variety was needed for rapid natural selection to occur, to go from sauropsids to synapsids; animatronics technician Neill Gorton would develop a working moving model; the Moschops plant eater, the more dangerous carnivore Anteosaurus, and the slower Lystrosaurus; paleontologists did not know whether therapsids laid eggs, or have birth to live animals; nasal concha bones; the Permian–Triassic extinction event, 252 million years ago, which scientists did not know the direct cause, and had taken place over 100,000 years; Pangaea was formed 350 million years ago; Tony Hallam of the University of Birmingham, and the events in the Triassic; due the extinction event, Lystrosaurus became much greater in number, as its predators had become extinct; small reptiles evolved into the dinosaurs, and Lystrosaurus evolved into rodents; loss of species was being counted on Madagascar; conservationist Joanna Durbin (now of the Climate, Community & Biodiversity Alliance) and the population of Lemur monkeys on Madagascar; Colin Tudge believed that mass extinctions were integral to evolution; Lystrosaurus lasted for ten million years. Narrated by Roger Allam, produced by Joanne Reay, directed by Howard Reay, made by The Mission, with the Discovery Channel
- 1 December Mindreaders, about autistic traits; Simon Baron Cohen at Cambridge; Temple Grandin in east Colorado; experimental psychologist Alison Gopnik of the University of California, Berkeley; the Sally–Anne test; Helen Tager-Flusberg, and Williams syndrome; Nancy Etcoff of Harvard Medical School; Phineas Gage; neurologist Robert T. Knight of UC Berkeley; Turner syndrome, where females miss the other X chromosome, and have autistic characteristics; David Skuse of the UCL Great Ormond Street Institute of Child Health found that if this X chromosome originated from the mother, the chances of autistic characteristics were much higher; female brains were typically more attuned to faces than male brains; the book An Anthropologist on Mars. Narrated by British actor Bernard Hill, produced by John Wyver, directed by Jeremy Taylor, made by Illuminations Productions. The female actress was Zoe Margolis, later known for Girl with a One-Track Mind
- 15 December The Conspiracy of Science, about biotechnology companies in Boston (US); David Kent of Genzyme; the Economic Espionage Act of 1996; the murder of Tsunao Saitoh, and his daughter, in May 1996; Steven Rosenberg of the National Cancer Institute; David Blumenthal of Massachusetts General Hospital; a study by Sandoz (now Novartis) into calcium channel blockers, such as felodipine, by Curt Furberg; full disclosure, or lack of any, of known adverse effects remains a greatly controversial subject. Narrated by Neil Pearson, produced by Geoff Deehan, directed by Tim Shawcross, made by Union Pictures with The Learning Channel (TLC)
- 22 December Moscow, We Have a Problem, about the Mir EO-23 collision in 1997; Mir had a fire on 24 February 1997; Michael Foale travelled to Mir in May 1997 on Atlantis; the father of Michael Foale was an RAF Meteor pilot; Mir had been in orbit since February 1987, 248 miles above the Earth; the shuttle was docked with Mir for five days; cosmonaut Konstantin Feoktistov, designer of Mir; Mir was only meant to last three years; the oxygen that the cosmonauts breathe originates from the crew's urine; on 24 June 1997, due to saving money on a radar system, a manual docking of the Progress resupply vehicle took place, where the Progress vehicle hit a module, side on; NASA never conducted docking without radar, in such a possibly dangerous way; Vladimir Solovyov (cosmonaut), director of the RKA Mission Control Center; cosmonaut Vasily Tsibliyev accidentally disconnected an important power cable; two more cosmonauts arrived to mend the module on 14 August 1997; the two previous cosmonauts returned to Earth; on 15 September 1997, Mir came close to a NASA satellite; the International Space Station would be launched in June 1998, to cost £20bn; Frank L. Culbertson Jr, director from 1995 of the Shuttle–Mir program; Michael Foale returned to Earth on 27 September 1997 after 142 days, on the Atlantis shuttle; cosmonaut Sergei Krikalev. Narrated by Haydn Gwynne, produced by Julian Ware, directed by Patrick Fleming, made by ITN Factual

=== 1998 ===
- 1 January The King of Chaos, an Equinox Special which was a fictional documentary or docudrama, set 15 years in the future with Danny Webb and Christine Kavanagh, followed by the documentary Storm Over 4, which featured Channel 4's most controversial programmes, including January 1995's Beyond Love; the documentary was one of three nominees for the Originality award in the 1999 British Academy Television Awards; the mock-documentary was fictionally presented by Bella Enahoro, daughter of Nigerian Anthony Enahoro; a body is found in the Thames, missing for two days, filmed near the South Quay Footbridge, built in 1997, a few months before the production was filmed in late 1997; Everett Barnes (Burt Caesar), chief of security of Keller Corp; Robert Sinclair, chief of Keller Corp; Keller gives a speech on 18 December 2011 at the Turing Seminar; reporter Helen Parker (Christine Kavanagh); Superintendent Andrea Walker (Janet Amsden); Richard Steiner, chief of Eagle Television, obviously resemblant of Rupert Murdoch; Keller had Bulgarian heritage; the non-fictional Prof Peter Cochrane, Head of Research at BT, but he talked about a fictional story; Victor Bunin (Olegar Fedoro); Jean Tate (Margaret Enefer, now a TV producer), fictional Channel 4 reporter; non-fictional American Rob Glaser, chief of RealNetworks; David Britten (Ben Aris), fictional Director-General of the BBC, outside the Queen Elizabeth II Centre; in 2002, 40% of subscription TV channels would close; fictional MP Jean Fransley (Su Elliott). Produced by Peter Goodchild, directed by Bryn Higgins (the mock-documentary looked like an episode of Casualty, which he would later direct), made by Stone City Films
- 14 July Russian Roulette, about the early warning system in operation over Russia; 25 January 1995 over the Barents Sea, an object is detected, which at first looks like a missile, but after 8 minutes falls into the sea - it was a Norwegian rocket, and the Russians had been notified of the launch weeks before, but had not told their radar units; Bruce G. Blair, a nuclear security writer from the Brookings Institution; Colonel Robert Bykov of the Strategic Rocket Forces of Russia; Alexander Pikayev of the State Duma Defence Committee; Admiral Stansfield Turner of the United States Navy; General Eugene E. Habiger of the United States Air Force who was Commander in Chief from 1996 to 1998 of United States Strategic Command; Richard Lugar, former senator for Indiana; Ash Carter, later United States Secretary of Defense, from 2015 to 2017; the US spent around $2.5 billion sending former nuclear missiles back to Russia in the early 1990s; Matthew Bunn, writer on nuclear security; the Soviet Union had 8 main radar sites in its early warning system - a main site in Latvia was dismantled, and nine satellites became three; General Vladimir Dvorkin (Russian), who wanted missiles to be less 'launchable', known as de-alerting; Lieutenant-General William Eldridge Odom, who was sceptical of 1990s meetings between US and Russian generals; Alexei Yablokov (Russian and the danger of suitcase nuclear devices, and Alexander Lebed; Armimex and a June 1997 commercial plot; William Cohen, United States Secretary of Defense from 1997 to 2001. Written by June Cross, directed by Dan Chambers, produced by David Dugan, made by Windfall Films and WGBH. Shown on PBS Frontline on 23 February 1999
- 21 July The Bodyhunters, about the disappearance of Royal Marine Alan Addis; on 8 August 1980, Royal Marine went missing in North Arm; the Forensic Search Advisory Group, from the Home Office, was founded in 1988 by forensic archaeologist John Hunter of the University of Birmingham, with Sgt Mick Swindells of Lancashire Constabulary, providing the first evidence by an archaeologist in a British court; Swindells had found 5 yr old Rosie McCann, of Moorheys in Oldham, in only a few hours in March 1996, after she had disappeared on 14 January 1996 - the local police had been, conversely, searching for seven weeks and had not found anything in that time, and with the generous assistance of RAF search teams; the FSAG adopted a much different searching approach to typical police methods, with archaeology, more educated guesses, and applied geophysics; the individual was part of Naval Party 8901, to train locals in civil defence in 1980; Islands Radio; the team took ground-penetrating radar and five local policemen; three years previously detectives from Devon and Cornwall Police conducted an investigation and arrested four people - three of those were Titch Jaffray, Burnerd Peck and Tony Blake; the team were conducting a nine-day search in 1997; 80-90% of murders have disposal in known areas to the murderer; Chris Johnson was a former Royal Marine; the team looked in the cemetery first, with ground-penetrating radar, which could detect up to three metres below the surface, for irregularities; Tim Cotter, from the Royal Navy; the team knew that any disused buildings would be a plausible hiding place, as nothing is often suspected; in a search site, the team found mixed, or disturbed, soil. Narrated by Robin Ellis, made with the Discovery Channel
- 28 July Miracle Police, including the Audrey Santo case; personnel of the Roman Catholic Diocese of Worcester; the investigator Joe Nickell; Peter Gumpel of the Congregation for the Causes of Saints; evolutionary psychologist Robin Dunbar; John Polkinghorne of the University of Cambridge; Karen Armstrong, who wrote A History of God; the Lourdes Medical Bureau; Luigi Bommarito, Archbishop from 1988 to 2002 of the Roman Catholic Archdiocese of Catania. Narrated by Piers Gibbon, directed by Alexander Marengo, made by Ideal World with the Discovery Channel
- 4 August Dawn of the Death Ray, about the laser and its invention in July 1960; physicist Arthur Schawlow, inventor of the laser; testing of lasers took place at Kirtland Air Force Base, New Mexico, where an aircraft was first brought down with a laser in November 1973; a laser-equipped Boeing KC-135 was operated from 1973, by the 4900th Flight Test Group, led by Col John Otten, taking off in January 1975; fighter aircraft would launch air to air missiles, with insufficient fuel, at the aircraft, and the laser would attempt to shoot the missile down; after three years, on 26 May 1983, the laser shot down its first air to air Sidewinder missile; adverse atmospheric conditions often made an airborne laser ineffective; the White Sands Missile Range in New Mexico, and Leik Myrabo of the USAF Advanced Concepts Division; the 1991 Gulf War allowed much advanced technology to be fully evaluated - and Patriot missiles had mostly missed Iraqi Scud missiles; the Directed Energy Directorate of the Air Force Research Laboratory, and its Starfire Optical Range, and physicist Robert Fugate; John V. Breakwell; the USAF ordered seven airborne attack lasers, for delivery by 2008; Major-General Don Lamberson. Narrated by Michael Bywater, directed by Chris Durlacher, produced by David Dugan, made by Windfall Films
- 11 August Thin Air, about climbers on Mount Everest; in the 1996, eight participants on an Everest expedition died in one day; above 17,000 ft climbers experience weight loss and sleep loss; Peter Hackett (mountaineer); Ed Viesturs from Seattle; David Breashears, who made the documentary; when he was making a film in May 1996, eight climbers died in the 1996 Mount Everest disaster; climbers fly by helicopter to 9,000 ft, then climb to base camp at 17,600 ft; pulmonologist Brownie Schoene of the University of Washington School of Medicine in Seattle; psychologist Gail Rosenbaum; chronic mountain sickness and the portable hyperbaric bag, which is pumped to 2 PSI; the Khumbu Glacier and Khumbu Icefall; Guy Cotter of Adventure Consultants; the 'death zone' is above 26,000 ft; the Lhotse western face; the team reach the South Col, known as Camp VI; the Hillary Step; pulse oximetry and brain MRI scans are taken in Seattle. Broadcast on PBS as Everest - the death zone, when narrated by Jodie Foster. British edition narrated by Piers Gibbon, directed by David Breashears, made by Nova
- 18 August The Ten Plagues of Egypt, about the Plagues of Egypt in the Book of Exodus; Avi Weiss, who researched the Book of Exodus; doctor John S. Marr looked at the Ipuwer Papyrus, and worked with Curtis Malloy; marine biologist JoAnn Burkholder of North Carolina State University, and how Pfiesteria piscicida could be the first plague; Richard Wassersug of Dalhousie University in Canada, and a plague of frogs; entomologist Richard Brown of Mississippi State University in Starkville, Mississippi; public health entomologist Andrew Spielman of Harvard T.H. Chan School of Public Health; Roger Breeze of Plum Island Animal Disease Center; the final plague was likely caused by Stachybotrys chartarum, which made mycotoxin. Narrated by Jenni Murray, produced by Peter Spry-Leverton, directed by Bill Eagles, made by UFA GmbH and Café Productions, with The Learning Channel
- 1 September Resurrecting the Mammoth, about the revival of the woolly mammoth; there may be 10 million frozen mammoths in northern Siberia, and many around the Kolyma (river); the Condover mammoth of Shropshire, found in 1986, with a model at the Shropshire Hills Discovery Centre; in 1796, the first true picture of a mammoth was drawn by French zoologist Georges Cuvier; Kazufumi Goto wanted to resurrect the mammoth; Andrei Sher of the Russian Academy of Sciences; the Beryozovka mammoth of 1901 in Beryozovka (Kolyma), is one of the best preserved mammoths found; the Kirgilyakh mammoth (Dima), found on 23 June 1977 on the Kirgilyakh Peninsula; zoologist Adrian Lister, and DNA fragments of the mammoth; Australian reproductive biologist Ceinwen Gearon; Dan Fisher; geoscientist Paul Schultz Martin, and the Quaternary extinction event in the Late Pleistocene that led to the disappearance of the Mammoth species, possibly associated with Clovis culture; geoarchaeologist Vance Haynes; Larry Agenbroad; archaeologist Steven Mithen. Produced by Frances Berrigan, directed by Christopher Swayne, made by Cicada Films with the Discovery Channel
- 8 September The Big G, about gravity; Saturn's gravity destroyed its moons, to make its rings; Newton's laws unleashed the industrial revolution; geophysicist Victoria Lagenheim of the USGS, and gravimetry (gravity mapping); physicist Gabriel Luther; astrophysicist Robert Kirshner of the Harvard-Smithsonian Center for Astrophysics; Andrulla Blanchette; Apollo asteroid (35396) 1997 XF11 will approach the Earth on 26 October 2028 at 600,000 miles; reproductive biologist Lynn Maxey Wiley of UC Davis; neurologist Edward Good; neuroscientist Muriel Ross of NASA Ames; astrobiologist James Clifford of NASA Ames; Ralph Pelligra, chief medical officer at NASA Ames; astronauts Bernard A. Harris Jr. and David Wolf (astronaut); the ISS would be complete by 2004; astrophysicist Alex Filippenko at University of California, Berkeley; astrophysicist Saul Perlmutter at Lawrence Berkeley National Laboratory; astrophysicist Adam Riess of the High-Z Supernova Search Team, who found in 1998 that the universe rate of expansion is increasing, winning the 2011 Nobel Prize for Physics. Narrated by Eva Pope, produced by David Frank, directed by Paul Sapin; made by RDF Media and the Discovery Channel
- 15 September The Secret Life of the Dog, with David Paxton of the University of Papua New Guinea; Jonica Newby wrote The Pact for Survival; 75% of all dogs came from one female dog 100,000 years ago, from mitochondrial genetic evidence; British zoologist John Bradshaw; anthropologist Colin Groves of Australian National University; the domestication of dogs has been modelled by Russian zoologist Lyudmila Trut and experiments from 1952 on the domesticated silver fox, whereby only individual silver foxes that didn't bite humans could breed, at the Institute of Cytology and Genetics in Novosibirsk - by 1972, silver foxes from the silver fox Laska had become so suddenly similar to dogs, in their temperament, and would respond to their name being called; Russian zoologist Larissa Kolesnikova. Narrated by Peter Capaldi, produced by David Paterson, directed by David Malone, made by Boa Picture Company, with the Discovery Channel
- 22 September Killer Earth, about the disappearance of dinosaurs; 65 million years ago, two-thirds of species disappeared; French geophysicist Vincent Courtillot; flood basalt eruptions; the Kīlauea volcano, in the Pacific Ocean, is the world's most active volcano; volcanologist Sir Stephen Sparks of the University of Bristol; the Latourell Falls in Oregon; volcanologist Stephen Self; geochronologist Paul Renne of the Berkeley Geochronology Center, and his research on the Siberian Traps, which erupted 250 million years ago, when 95% of species disappeared in the Permian-Triassic extinction event (P-T boundary); sedimentologist Tom Yancey. Narrated by Heather Couper, produced by Stuart Carter, directed by David Hutt, made by Pioneer Productions.
- 29 September Ekranoplan - the Caspian Sea Monster, about the Caspian Sea Monster and ground-effect vehicles; the US accidentally discovered the Ekranoplan in 1970 by the Defense Intelligence Agency; the vehicle was 300 ft long, and 540 tonnes, and twice as big as the B-52; the Soviets called it a 'prototype ship'; the Alekseyev Central Hydrofoil Design Bureau was in Nizhny Novgorod; Igor Vasilevsky and Vladimir Kirillovikh, the chief designer; the company invented the hydrofoil in the late 1950s, winning the Lenin Prize in 1957; hydroaerodynamics engineer Kirril Rozhdestvensky; Victor Dygalo; construction of the KM began in 1963, first tested in October 1966, flown by Vladimir Loginov, reaching 350 mph; designer Dmitri Sinitsyn; Ivan Kapitanets, and its military version; designer Vladimir Bulanov; Günther Jörg of Germany; the possible Spasatel; the Naval Air Warfare Center at Naval Air Station Patuxent River. Narrated by Heather Couper, produced by Grant McKee, directed by Hamish Barbour, made by Ideal World and the Discovery Channel
- 6 October Homicide in Kennewick, about Kennewick Man, investigated by Jim Chatters; on 6 July 1996 evidence was found; forensic anthropologist Katie Macmillan; anthropological geneticist David Smith of University of California, Davis; forensic anthropologist Doug Owsley; Stephen McNallen of the Asatru Folk Assembly; Samuel George Morton; the Ainu people of Japan. Produced by Eve Kay, directed by Mark Halliley, made by RDF Television with the Discovery Channel

=== 1999 ===
- 3 January Apocalypse, When?, an Equinox Special, the title originates from the 1979 film Apocalypse Now; at Garland, Texas the Chen Tao (UFO religion) believed that God would broadcast to Earth on Channel 18 at midnight on 24 March 1998; the journalist Damian Thompson, who wrote on apocalyptic beliefs; historian Richard Landes; historian Kristen Lippincott, and how the Egyptians invented the solar calendar of 365 days around four thousand years ago; computer scientist Nachum Dershowitz; journalist Marina Benjamin and the Book of Revelation; in 45 BC, the Romans introduced the calendar as we largely know today, with leap years and twelve months, with July and August having 31 days; Constantine the Great became a Christian in 312, so formed the seven-day week in 321; AD years were started by Dionysius Exiguus in 525, and the date of Easter; the forthcoming rapture; Father Michael Evans of Belmont Abbey, Herefordshire; Gwynneth Flower of Action 2000, and Peter de Jager. Narrated by Piers Gibbon, produced by Will Aslett, directed by Peter Webber, made with Discovery Channel
- 12 April Living Dangerously, about people who take risks, if that involves low monoamine oxidase, with John Henry (toxicologist); two base jumpers, John and Elliott, climb a 500 ft television transmitter in December 1998; men have lower levels of MAO than women, and MAO increases with age, so men in their 20s have the least aversion to risk; possible dangers of the Minulet contraceptive (ethinylestradiol/gestodene); health scares may be out of proportion to the risk involved, and is overegging the pudding. Directed by Chris Wells, produced by Hilary Lawson, made by TVF Media with the Discovery Channel
- 19 April Riddle of the Leaning Tower, about the Leaning Tower of Pisa; in 1995, the tower was moving at 1mm a year; civil engineer John Burland; construction began in 1172, and construction stopped for 100 years; Piero Pierotti of the University of Pisa; the 1997 Umbria and Marche earthquake took place on 26 September 1997; haste was required, so in 1998 soil extraction was approved to attempt to moderate the lean of the tower; soil extraction began in February 1999, and the tower began to move. Narrated by Piers Gibbon, produced by Simon Nasht, directed by Chris Durlacher, made by Pilot Productions, with WGBH Nova and Rai 3 (Rai Tre) of Italy, and AVRO (AVROTROS since 2014) of the Netherlands
- 26 April Sweden, Sex and the Disappearing Doctors, about compulsory sterilisation in Sweden, after a law was passed in 1934; until 1975, the Swedish government had compulsory sterilised 60,000 citizens; the forty-year programme began as a eugenics programme to breed a Nordic race; historian Gunnar Broberg; environment minister Anna Lindh; writer Jan Myrdal; individuals who were unlikely to financially contribute to the Swedish state, not intelligent, or who had been labelled as anti-social, were most likely to be forcibly sterilised; anti-social youths were given the choice between being sterilised or prison; 90% of people sterilised were women, and many were single mothers of limited means; oral contraceptives made the sterilisation programme redundant; the State Institute for Racial Biology in Uppsala, and geneticist Ulf Pettersson; the documentary was conducted in a hard-hitting confrontational Panorama-style. Narrated by Fisher Dilke, produced by Nick Catliff, made by Lion Television
- 10 May A Sense of Disaster, about predicting earthquakes; Allan Lindh of the USGS; 17 October 1989 a large earthquake hit California, killing 67 people, with £7bn of damage in the 1989 Loma Prieta earthquake; Chen Li De of China; China predicted earthquakes by radon gas; Huang Xiang Ning, who predicted an earthquake near Tangshan in late July 1976 - the 1976 Tangshan earthquake occurred on 28 July 1976; the Great Hanshin earthquake on 17 January 1995 in Japan, the worst for seventy years in Japan; nuclear physicist Motoji Ikeya of the University of Osaka; geophysicist Joseph Kirschvink of Caltech, who had worked with bees and electromagnetic fields. Narrated by Barbara Flynn, produced by Bill Jones, directed by Chris Malone, made by Granada Television with the Discovery Channel
- 17 May Deadly Code, about biological weapons and genetic engineering; Vivienne Nathanson of the BMA; ethnic bioweapons; a religious cult leaves nerve gas on Tokyo underground trains in January 1995; Richard A. Falkenrath; Paul Taylor, director of chemical and biological defence at Porton Down; the National Domestic Preparedness Consortium in the US; General John Doesburg, of the Chemical & Biological Defense Command; Conor Egleston of Southampton General Hospital; on 10 April 1972 the Biological Weapons Convention was signed by the UK, the US and the Soviet Union, but the West suspected that the Soviet Union would still continue its research, which was proved when microbiologist Ken Alibek defected in 1992, who worked at the Stepnogorsk Scientific and Technical Institute for Microbiology in Kazakhstan; the Soviets had around 25,000 scientists on their bio-warfare programme in the 1980s; Eric Henchal of the United States Army Medical Research Institute of Infectious Diseases; the Iraqi biological weapons program had a site that made anthrax, which was discovered after Iraqi microbiologist Rihab Taha disclosed the vast scale of Iraqi manufacture of bioweapons; in 1998 Iraq blocked UN inspectors to its bioweapons plants, so the UK and the US bombed these plants; the USS Mitscher (DDG-57); the monkeypox virus; CODIS, the Combined DNA Index System, run by the FBI, which had allowed scientists to know if a criminal was black, white, Hispanic or native American, through genetic markers; microbiologist Ellen Vitetta of the University of Texas Southwestern Medical Center. Narrated by Robin Ellis, produced by Rachel Allen, directed by Sarah Marris, made by TVF Media
- 24 May Storm in a D Cup, about breast implants; Sally Kirkland was a main protagonist against implants; Sybil Niden Goldrich of the Command Trust Network; Marcia Angell of The New England Journal of Medicine; the British 1990s glamour model Teresa May; Roger Sturrock of the University of Glasgow; Dennis Deapen of the University of Southern California; Sai Ramastry of the University of Illinois Chicago; British 1990s glamour model Hannah Callow sat nonchalantly on a London underground train, with surreptitious nearby male attention. Directed by Martin Durkin (often chose quite controversial topics), made by his company Kugelblitz
- 7 June Curse of the Phantom Limbs, about sensations of phantom limbs; Jackie Naylor lost her hand in an accident on the A57 in 1989; neuroscientist Peter Halligan, since 2018 the Chief Scientific Adviser for Wales; photographer Alexa Wright makes superfiction images of phantom limbs; the Douglas Bader Centre at the Queen Mary's Hospital, Roehampton; Canadian psychologist Ronald Melzack of McGill University; Conrad Weiskrantz, son of neuroscientist Lawrence Weiskrantz had a motorbike accident on a country road, where he hit a vehicle towing a trailer turning right; the Silver Spring monkeys; neuroscientist V. S. Ramachandran of University of California, San Diego; Canadian neurosurgeon Wilder Penfield conducted cortical stimulation mapping research in the 1950s, resulting in the cortical homunculus and cortical maps; neurosurgeon Tipu Aziz. Narrated by Henrietta Bess, produced by Nicholas Kent, directed by Peter Webber
- 19 July What Shall We Do with the Moon?, shown thirty years after the 1969 Moon landing; about colonization of the Moon; Greg Bennett (writer); the Apollo 17 mission, in December 1972; Alan Binder, who worked on the January 1998 Lunar Prospector, which discovered water on the Moon; Jim Benson and his SpaceDev at Poway, California; the Thunderbird proposal of Starchaser Industries; the Nomad rover, developed by Carnegie Mellon University in Pittsburgh; chemist Nigel Packham of NASA; physicist David Criswell, and solar power on the Moon. Narrated by Scottish actress Daniela Nardini, produced by Katrina Phillips, directed by Chris Durlacher, made by Wall to Wall Television. Shown on the Discovery Science (European TV channel)
- 6 September Frozen Hearts, up to 50% of people on a heart-lung machine have some form of brain deterioration, and for one in five, the deterioration is permanent Alan Egar had heart surgery, but he had memory difficulties after the operation; he found difficulty finishing sentences; in the US four-year-old Samantha Summers is put on a heart-lung machine at Boston Children's Hospital; David Eckmann, later the Horatio C. Wood Professor of Anesthesiology and Critical Care at the Perelman School of Medicine at the University of Pennsylvania, and a professor of engineering at the University of Pennsylvania School of Engineering and Applied Science, travelled to the State Research Institute of Circulation Pathology (since 2008 called the Meshalkin National Medical Research Center), at Novosibirsk in Novosibirsk Oblast in Siberia, to visit anesthetist Dmitri Guvakov (now at the Penn State Milton S. Hershey Medical Center) carry out an operation on ten-year-old Lyuda Sudilovskaya Produced by Brian Kay, directed by Pauline Duffy, made by Yorkshire Television
- 13 September Space - the Final Junkyard, about space debris; Nick Johnson of NASA; Paul Maley of United Space Alliance, and JSC Astronomical Society; Mark Mulrooney of the NASA Orbital Debris Observatory, and its liquid-mirror telescope; Scott J. Horowitz; Pam McCraw of Mission Operations Directorate at the Johnson Space Center in Texas; the Institute for Advanced Technology at the University of Texas at Austin; Richard Crowther of the Defence Evaluation and Research Agency; Don Kessler of NASA JSC; the French reconnaissance Cerise (satellite), which was damaged on 24 July 1996 by debris from Ariane; Darren McKnight and Kosmos 1275, launched on 4 June 1981, and was damaged on 24 July 1981; on 24 January 1978, the nuclear-powered Kosmos 954, a RORSAT, crashed into Canada; The Aerospace Corporation; the Russian Mars 96 was launched on 16 November 1996, to hopefully reach Mars on 12 September 1997, but re-entered the atmosphere east of Iquique in north Chile on 17 November 1997, carrying 270g of plutonium; as part of NASA's Systems for Nuclear Auxiliary Power, the satellite Transit 5BN-3 with a SNAP-9A nuclear power source, launched from Vandenberg Air Force Base (since May 2021, Vandenberg Space Force Base) in California, and never reached orbit on 21 April 1964, dispersing 1 kg of plutonium-238; the Iridium satellite constellation of 66 telecommunication satellites and the proposed Teledesic scheme; a damaged satellite could cause the catastrophic Kessler syndrome; John Muratore and the NASA X-38. Produced by Robert Eagle, directed by Patrick Fleming, made by Eagle & Eagle, with The Learning Channel. Shown on TLC in 1999
- 20 September Do Parents Matter?, about the psychological needs of children; the psychiatrist Stanley Greenspan; the book The Nurture Assumption by Judith Rich Harris argued that a child's associates shaped their personality, as seen most commonly in their teenage years; teenage subdivisions in the USA - the 'populars' and the 'jocks'; at university, Judith Harris had her study stopped by the famous psychology academic George Armitage Miller; Thomas J. Bouchard Jr. at the University of Minnesota and his study of separated identical twins and the effect of genes, which he estimated to be around 50%; the effect of the home was thought to account for the other 50%, but psychologists did not find anything like that; work by psychologist Carolyn Rovee-Collier; primatology and work by Frans de Waal; childhood studies by William Corsaro influenced findings; the 'normals' teenage subdivision; the 1953 Asch conformity experiments on teenagers by psychologist Solomon Asch, with five stooges in a group of six teenagers that would often exert group influence over the sixth teenager, helped findings; a similar effect was deployed in the Candid Camera series, to convince people; the 'skaters' teenage subdivision; further studies on conformity in the Stanford prison experiment of 1971 by Philip Zimbardo - the BBC made the 2002 documentary The Experiment; the 'loners' teenage subdivision. Narrated by Stephen Rashbrook, produced by Nick Catliff, directed by Henry Singer, made by Lion Television and Sandpaper Films. Shown on Monday 7 February 2000 on The Nature of Things in Canada
- 27 September Near Miss, about ATC, the 1960 New York mid-air collision in December 1960; around 7,500 aircraft visit the three airports each day; LaGuardia Airport has two conjoined runways that operate in a strange mixed way; on 3 April 1998 there was a near miss; USAir Flight 5050 in September 1989; Colombian Avianca Flight 52 in January 1990 approached John F. Kennedy International Airport when running out of fuel, when a 4-hour flight turned into 6 hours due to weather. Narrated by Jack Davenport, directed by Jeremy Llewellyn-Jones, produced by Emma Bowman, made by Windfall Films and The Learning Channel (TLC). On All 4
- 4 October Curing the Incurable, the strange teratoma cells; Paul R. Sanberg of the University of South Florida; Irving Weissman of Stanford University; pathologist John Goepel; Peter Andrews (biologist); neurosurgeon Douglas Kondziolka of the University of Pittsburgh Medical Center, and stereotactic surgery; John Sinden of ReNeuron; Ann Tsukamoto of CytoTherapeutics. Narrated by David Malone, made by Boa Picture Company
- 20 December Talking with Aliens, an Equinox Special, with zoologist Denise L. Herzing, made by Pioneer Films

=== 2000 ===
- 13 March The Secret Life of the Crash Test Dummy, about the biomechanics of car crashes; a typical crash test dummy cost around £100,000, with about three hundred individual parts, that had to be included by safety law, and new cars could not be sold until the dummy had tested it sufficiently; the Volvo 300 1980s television advert; Lt-Col Wayne Mattson of the USAF and a strange crash in New Mexico, one hundred miles north of the Trinity (nuclear test), and near White Sands Missile Range, where German V-2 missiles were being tested, which were conveniently blamed by the USAF on anthropomorphic dummies; John Melvin (engineer) and the legacy of USAF biophysicist and doctor Colonel John Stapp, who mostly invented aviation safety testing; John Stapp conducted gruesome horrific deceleration tests on himself; Alderson had made artificial limbs for injured USAF World War II pilots, so made a full artificial proto-human; John Stapp tested his dummies in vehicles; Clarence Ditlow and the Center for Auto Safety; in 1966 it became legal in the US for new cars to have been tested by dummies; mathematical models of injury were needed, to translate the acquired crash data into possible effects on the human body, worked out by mechanical engineer Walter Pilkey of the University of Virginia; Scottish orthopaedic surgeon Angus Wallace and impact speed on bone tensile strength; in 1976 the Hybrid III dummy was designed, the automotive industry standard design; David Abbott, advertising executive; the data for designing the crash test dummy, Hybrid III, was mostly derived from data procured for human male occupants - and typical (fiftieth percentile) males, not female, and females had much different bodies; child dummies were essentially smaller adult male dummies, which was not biologically true; new dummies were developed at the National Transportation Biomechanics Research Center. Narrated by Andrew Lincoln, produced by Cathy Rogers, directed by Peter Webber, made by RDF Television. Shown on Wednesday 17 January 2001 on The Nature of Things in Canada
- 20 March Rise and Fall of GM Food, about genetically modified food; Belgian geneticist Marc Van Montagu, of the University of Ghent, visits Havana in Cuba, where a new research centre opened with Carlos Borroto; protests by topless women; GM was largely first developed by Mexican geneticist Herrera Estrella, of the Centre of Investigation and Advanced Studies; Rob Fraley of Monsanto; US farmers spend $8bn dollars on herbicides and pesticides; Roger N. Beachy had a breakthrough in 1986 at the Washington University in St. Louis, now at the Donald Danforth Plant and Science Center; Monsanto made the first insecticide-resistant plant in 1987; many African farmers cannot afford insecticides; Cyrus Ndiritu of the Kenya Agriculture Research Institute; much food harvested in Africa does not last before it reaches the consumer; in 1990 Don Grierson of the Plant Science Division of the University of Nottingham found genes of ripening; Channapatna Prakash of Tuskegee University in Alabama; aluminium toxicity of soils in tropical countries affected yield; Julian Borger of The Guardian; biologist Mae-Wan Ho of the Open University; biologist John Gatehouse of the University of Durham, and the Pusztai affair at The Rowett Institute; Helen Browning, Chairman of the Soil Association; former Vice-Chancellor of UEA, Derek Burke; former Independent environment correspondent Richard D. North, who had grown out of love with the hard-line environmental movement; European farmers grew five times more produce than they did in the 1960s, and there were twice as many trees in the UK than in the 1920s; Renée Elliott of Planet Organic; around 100m children in Third World countries suffered from Vitamin A deficiency. Directed by Martin Durkin, made by his company Kugelblitz
- 27 March Simply Complex, about the physicist Murray Gell-Mann; by an accident, he devised strangeness of sub-atomic particles, in his mid-20s; he predicts an omega minus particle, which was found in 1962; he predicts that the proton and neutron were made of three triplet particles, which he called quarks from Finnegans Wake and his Eightfold way (physics), also predicted by George Zweig; he worked closely with Richard Feynman at Caltech in the 1960s; on 30 October 1969 he is told that he had won the Nobel Prize for Physics; his friendship with MIT mechanical engineer Seth Lloyd; British physicist Geoffrey West; the documentary is in a biographic informal style that Horizon has since often followed. Produced by Barbara Altounyan, directed by Celia Lowenstein, made by Diverse Productions
- 3 April Meningitis - Search for a Cure, 3,000 people in the UK had meningitis in 1999; microbiologist Martin C. J. Maiden; one in five died from meningococcal disease; damage is caused by the endotoxin (lipopolysaccharide); a healthy survey is carried out at Burford School; Mike Levin (paediatrician) at Imperial College, and how meningitis A is a huge danger in Africa; 60% of cases in the UK are meningitis B, and many such cases are treated at St Mary's Hospital, London; Brett Giroir of the Children's Medical Center Dallas; 17-year-old Amy Mansell from Whitstable was in a coma for five weeks. Narrated by Paul Brightwell, produced by David Dugan, directed by Jeremy Llewellyn-Jones, made by Windfall Films with Nova and WGBH Boston. It was shown on Nova as Killer Disease on Campus, episode 9 of season 29, shown on 3 September 2002, and shown under the original programme title as a half-hour programme on 6 November 2003 on Catalyst on ABC in Australia
- 10 April The Box, about flight recorders, with ValuJet Airlines Flight 592 which crashed on 11 May 1996; voice recorders have been compulsory since the late 1960s; Dukane Seacom make emergency underwater locator beacons (ULBs); the Boeing 737, which had around 21,000 take-offs per day, was believed to have unreliable rudder control since the 1980s, as shown in the United Airlines Flight 585 crash on 3 March 1991, having had two rudder incidents in the previous two weeks, with the aircraft flipping 35 seconds after take-off and crashing all in seven seconds; the electrohydraulic servo valve in the Boeing 737 rudder control unit was thought to be sometimes temperamental; Boeing claimed that the March 1991 crash was due to a rotor or lee wave, caused by nearby mountains; the USAir Flight 427 crash on 8 September 1994, where the aircraft flipped at 6,000 ft, in 28 seconds crashing; British Airways did not rely on their Penny & Giles quick access recorders, and would consolidate this data where anomalies were checked, so the NTSB needed BA's data for their 737 aircraft; this safer BA method was introduced by the previous British European Airways (BEA) when it had to prove to the CAA that its autoland system for the Trident was safe, in the Civil Aircraft Airworthiness Data Recording Programme which since 1990 has been collected by the British Airways Safety Information System (BASIS); the 1991 crash investigation concluded after 8 years in 1999, with Boeing ordered to redesign the servo valve.
- 9 October Full Throttle, about the technology and psychology of motor racing; Brazilian driver Christian Fittipaldi; the Eurofighter, controlled by computers, and due to enter RAF service in 2002; Archie Neill, BAE test pilot; Stephen Olvey, motor racing medical officer; driver Mark Blundell; the Long Beach Grand Prix in Los Angeles; Steve Clark, engineer for Mercedes; Brian Lisles and Peter Gibbons of Newman Haas Racing; the edge of performance envelope; Mario Andretti, former driver: Edward Winter of Sheffield Hallam University and predicting outcomes in sport, by intuition; John Rothwell of the Institute of Neurology in London, testing reflexes, by an MRI scanner, and how the brain stores instructions; psychologist Mike Land of the University of Sussex, and the psychology of prediction, and feedforward; life expectancy of racing drivers in the 1970s was short; racing drivers had risk positive personalities, and became accustomed to risk; psychologist Tim Wheeler; Jimmy Vasser of Chip Ganassi Racing; a female violinist plays La fille aux cheveux de lin; sports psychologist Brian Hemmings; Austrian driver Alexander Wurz of Benetton Formula; RAF SEPECAT Jaguar XZ103 of 41 Squadron; engineer Pat Symonds of Benetton Racing; Simon Taylor (journalist) of Motor Sport; Graham Rood of DERA Air Systems in north Hampshire. Narrated by Stephen Rashbrook, produced by Patrick Uden, directed by Andy Robbins, made by Uden Associates
- 16 October Lethal Seas: the Maelstrom, about ocean whirlpools; the Gulf of Corryvreckan in Scotland, Lofoten and Saltstraumen in Norway; with Prof Tsukasa Nishimura of Tokyo University of Science and Prof Walter Munk of the Scripps Institution of Oceanography; the Firth of Lorn in west Scotland has one of the world's most dangerous whirlpools, the Royal Navy avoids it; atmospheric physicist Peter Read; mathematician David Dritschel, and the Great Red Spot vortice; the dangerous Arran Rapids on the Cordero Channel in western Canada; Burkard Baschek of the Institute of Ocean Sciences, who dropped a CTD (instrument) into the torrential river currents; Tremble Island in the notorious Slingsby Channel, where a geophone was placed; the novel A Descent into the Maelström; Bjørn Gjevik, a fluid dynamicist in the Department of Mathematics, at the University of Oslo; strong tidal currents in the Naruto Strait in Japan, and the Naruto whirlpools. Narrated by Stephen Rashbrook, produced by Robert Sproul-Cran, directed by Kim Flitcroft, made by Northlight Productions with the Discovery Channel
- 23 October Einstein's Biggest Blunder, about calculations of the expansion of the universe; the documentary opens with a pastiche of the Star Wars opening credits; two physicists met in 1996, with a new radical proposal for explaining the many anomalies in the expansion of the universe - Andreas Albrecht (cosmologist) of the University of California, Davis and João Magueijo of Portugal; Dave Wark of the University of Sussex, visits Bern in Switzerland; Ruth Durrer of the University of Geneva; John E. Baldwin of the University of Cambridge, and the 1887 Michelson–Morley experiment, which found that the Earth's rotational speed did not affect the speed of light in any way, alongside the Venus movement of The Planets; to account for this, Einstein made his field equations, and lambda - the cosmological constant was added by Einstein to account for how space-time would need to expand; Einstein's equations inferred that the expansion of the universe rested on inherently unstable conditions; due to the Doppler effect, background radiation from the Big Bang is now perceived as microwave radiation; Richard Ellis (astronomer) of Caltech; Einstein didn't believe in the Big Bang until a meeting with Hubble in 1932 in California; with the new theory of an expanding universe, the cosmological constant was now required, but the precise trajectory of the expansion of the universe could not be directly predicted, which led to the flatness problem; the theory of inflation was put forward by Alan Guth in the 1970s; when at St John's College, Cambridge, João Magueijo had the radical proposal that if the speed of light was higher, in the early universe, a cosmological horizon of sufficient distance would be possible, to explain the predicted conditions of the expansion of the early universe, and the cosmological constant problem; the Royal Society gave him a research fellowship to work at Imperial College; as further exploratory work was clocked up, with calculations inclya variable speed of light, the team of physicists looked at other applications for their controversial proposals, such as the flatness problem, and what happened before the Big Bang; in 1998 astrophysicist John Webb, at the University of Cambridge, worked on the theory of a variable speed of light, through investigating quasars, the most distant objects that can be seen; and by looking at supernovae, it was largely expected that any recorded data would show indications of a deceleration in the rate of expansion of the universe, but the data instead showed that the rate of expansion was - increasing, which led to the lambda-CDM model. Narrated by Scottish actor Matthew Zajac, directed by David Sington, made by Dox Productions
- 30 October The Science of Stress, with 42-year-old actor Angus Kennedy; endocrinologist Stafford Lightman of the University of Bristol; Vivette Glover, a perinatal psychobiological at Imperial College; Sir Cary Cooper, psychologist at the former UMIST; Carolyn M. Mazure, psychiatrist at Yale School of Medicine; Charles Nemeroff, psychiatrist at Emory University School of Medicine. Narrated by Geoffrey Palmer, directed by Michael Samuels, produced by Bridget Sneyd, made by Lion Television and the Discovery Health Channel
- 7 December Science of Crime - Psychopath, with psychologists Robert D. Hare and Adrian Raine, about the psychopathic traits of insincere superficial charm, on the Psychopathy Checklist. Narrated by Neil Pearson, directed by John Purdie, produced by Rosalind Arden, made by Union Pictures
- 14 December Science of Crime - Criminal Evidence, about the forensic psychologist 49-year-old Kathy Reichs. Produced by Geoff Deehan, directed by Roger Pyke, made by Yap Films
- 21 December Science of Crime - Cybercops, the Hackers on Planet Earth conference; Cult of the Dead Cow, founded by Swamp Rat, and its Back Orifice software for accessing Windows 98; the Happy99 virus; wardialing; part of the High Technology Theft Apprehension and Prosecution Program in California. Narrated by Steven Mackintosh, written by Callum Macrae, directed by Witold Starecki

=== 2001 ===
- 7 January Hunt for the Death Star, about lethal energy bursts across the universe; Ray Klebesadel; music from the opening of You Only Live Twice; Bohdan Paczyński of Princeton University and unknown gamma-ray bursts; Stan Woosley of the University of California, Santa Cruz; the Compton Gamma Ray Observatory was deployed from 1991; Canadian Dale Frail of the Very Large Array in Socorro, New Mexico, and the W. M. Keck Observatory; the High Energy Transient Explorer 1 (HETE), launched incorrectly by a Northrop Grumman Pegasus on 4 November 1996, due to a faulty battery; music from Moonraker- Flight Into Space; Dutch researchers from the Anton Pannekoek Institute for Astronomy; the Italian BeppoSAX satellite, launched in April 1996; HETE 2 was launched on 9 October 2000. Narrated by Paul Brightwell, produced by David Sington, directed by David McNab, made by Dox Productions
- 4 March The Engines That Came in from the Cold, about the Russian N1 rocket with an unexpected and surprising outcome to the documentary, and a reference to the 1963 book The Spy Who Came in from the Cold; George Mueller, head of Apollo programme from 1963 to 1969; Charles Vick of the Federation of American Scientists; Sergei Korolev, chief designer at OKB-1; Vasily Mishin, deputy chief designer at OKB-1, had done calculations showing that to get a cosmonaut on the Moon, it required a 100 tonne vehicle in orbit, which would require a 2,000 tonne vehicle at lift-off; Valentin Anisimov, chief designer at Kuznetsov Design Bureau, and how Korolev approached the Kuznetsov company, to make the new rocket engines for the proposed N1 rocket launcher, but it was too new and large to develop from scratch, so thirty pre-existing engines would be deployed, and the pre-burner which powered the rocket pumps would become a closed cycle, to improve power by 25%, but this was vastly untested; the first twelve launches would be uncrewed, followed by two test crewed launches, and the Soviet limited budget meant that development was not at a sufficient stage (that NASA would have arrived at) before the launches were carried out; this first uncrewed launch took place on 21 February 1969, and one minute into the flight, the rocket exploded; the N1 had a thrust of 4,500 tonnes at launch; the N1 second launch took place on 3 July 1969, after the engine control system was modified, and a few seconds after launch the engine cut out, and the whole N1 launcher fell onto the launch pad, causing total catastrophic results - this explosion stopped any further Soviet Union attempt to reach the Moon with a crewed rocket, the launch pad damage was unrecoverable; two weeks later Apollo 11 landed on the Moon; the N1 next launch was on 26 June 1971, with a rebuilt launch pad, and this launch exploded one minute into the flight; the fourth launch of the N1 on 23 November 1972 exploded two minutes into the flight; by the mid-1970s the Kuznetsov NK-33 closed-cycle engine, for the N1, had been sufficiently tested in its development lifetime; the Soviet Moon mission was around four years behind NASA, and when the engines were finally sufficiently tested, the whole Soviet Moon programme was stopped in 1974; any N1 engines and systems were instructed to be removed, to eliminate its knowledge; only in the early 1990s did knowledge of the N1 first appear; Bob Ford of Lockheed Martin and Bill Hoffman of Aerojet; Kuznetsov had nonetheless kept around sixty NK-33 engines in Samara - the home of Soviet rocketry, and wanted to show these engines to visitors from Aerojet; after a successful test of an NK-33 at Sacramento in October 1995, the NK-33 was developed into the RD-180, which powered the American Lockheed Martin Atlas III rocket; John Karas, of Lockheed Martin, at the first launch of an American rocket, on 24 May 2000 of the Eutelsat 36A satellite, that was powered by a Russian engine - the RD-180, which was twice as powerful as the NK-33, and one engine could replace five engines of the previous Atlas II; Vladimir Chvanov and Boris Katorgin, designers at NPO Energomash; the American rocket engineers had viewed the closed-cycle method as far too dangerous, and it was dangerous, but Russian engineers had developed new stainless steel alloys to largely overcome this danger. Narrated by Jaye Griffiths, produced by Hamish Barbour, directed by, made by Ideal World Productions
- 17 June The Day the Oceans Boiled, about the Earth's environment; 55 million years ago, the Earth was 6C hotter than it is now, with no ice caps, and trees grew at Antarctica, the temperature became 8C hotter, known as the Paleocene-Eocene Thermal Maximum; mammals shrunk in how large; since 55m years ago, carbon dioxide has been absorbed by plants, cooling the Earth; climate models were derived from weather forecast models; Peter Cox (climatologist) of the Met Office, and carbon sinks, and how each year 6 billion tonnes of carbon dioxide enters the atmosphere, but the effect appears to be only from around 3 billion tonnes; Antonio Nobre of the National Institute of Amazonian Research - he found that the Amazon forest, and its 500 million hectares of trees, was a much bigger carbon sink than presumed - it could be absorbing three-quarters of the carbon dioxide of all the world's vehicles; the Greenland Ice Sheet Project, and Geoffrey Hargreaves at the National Science Foundation Ice Core Facility (NICL) in Colorado, and ice cores from the Vostok Station; the Earth has warmed and cooled in a 100,000 years cycle; the Met Office model predicted that after 2050, due to shortage of rainfall seasons, the Amazon forest would not act as a carbon sink; Carlos Nobre (scientist) and dry seasons, and the possible danger of fire, caused by changes in the tropical climate; Richard Corfield (scientist); Philip D. Gingerich of the University of Michigan; Santo Bains was researching the Paleocene-Eocene boundary, so went to the Gulf Coast Repository, and looked at Core 690 drilled by JOIDES Resolution of the Ocean Drilling Program from the Weddell Sea, and concluded that rapid changes in Earth temperature came from methane clathrates (methane hydrates); geologist Euan Nisbet; the Earth returned to lower temperatures after 60,000 years. Narrated by Matthew Zajac, directed by David Sington, made by Dox Productions
- 24 June The Fish That Time Forgot, about the coelacanth; Margery Courtney Latimer in 1938 of the Natural History Museum, London, and a fish caught at East London; J. L. B. Smith, from Grahamstown, of Rhodes University; the American Museum of Natural History; evolutionary biologist John McCusker; the Comoro Islands, run by the French, near Madagascar, where another fish was found in 1952; Mike Ruton; Robin Stobbs; the JAGO (German research submersible) and Hans Fricke of the Max Planck Institute for Behavioral Physiology, who found a live fish on 17 January 1987; Susan Jewett of the National Museum of Natural History in Washington; on 30 July 1998, a live female fish is found on a beach in Indonesia by Mark Erdmann. Narrated by Robert Lindsay, produced by Ron Ackerman, directed by Celia Lowenstein, made by Diverse Productions with Nova
- 8 July The Secret Life of the Mouse, about the laboratory mouse; zoologist Sam Berry of UCL; mouse geneticist Jo Peters of MRC Harwell; Irving Weissman; most genetic research is done with mice, with 25 million a year; Steve Brown, Director of MRC Harwell; the mouse has 99.9% of the genes of humans; the Jackson Laboratory has 1m mice and around 1,000 human staff, with 2,500 strains of mice, who have mouse models of human diseases, and mice breed much quicker than humans do; Beverly Paigen; in one year, there are three generations of mice; twenty Nobel prizes have depended on mouse research; Cliffe Rosen of the Maine Center of Osteoporosis Research; scientists want mutant mice for each gene; Charles Vacanti of the University of Massachusetts Medical School, whose cartilage research led to a mouse having an artificial cartilage human ear grown on its back; Philip Leder of Harvard Medical School, who placed a patent on a mouse; a fluorescent mouse; Hank Greely of Stanford University; it ends with the opening lines from A Tale of Two Cities. Narrated by Stephen Fry, produced by David Paterson, directed by Kevin Hull, made by BOA 2001. The documentary has overtones of the music video of the 2001 Where's Your Head At, made in the same year as the documentary
- 15 July Saving the Leaning Tower, a documentary chronicling the dramatic rescue of one of the world’s most iconic landmarks. By the late 1980s, the Leaning Tower of Pisa was on the brink of collapse, its southward tilt increasing steadily and threatening catastrophic failure. Alarm spread after the sudden fall of a medieval bell tower in Pavia in 1989, which convinced authorities to close Pisa’s monument to the public. An international committee of engineers, geologists, and historians was formed to save the tower, among them British civil engineer John Burland. Through detailed investigation, the team uncovered the structural weaknesses behind the marble façade and the unstable soils beneath Pisa. Computer models showed the tower should already have collapsed. Temporary steel tendons and 600 tonnes of lead counterweights prevented immediate disaster, but the tower’s fate remained uncertain. Burland proposed a novel, delicate solution: controlled “soil extraction” below the northern side to allow the tower to gently tilt back to stability. The project was plagued by risks, political disputes, and near-disasters, including the “Black September” of 1995, when freezing the foundations caused the tower to lurch alarmingly. Despite opposition, the soil extraction method was eventually approved in 1998. Over two years, engineers removed around 70 tonnes of soil, gradually reducing the lean by half a meter without visible alteration to the monument. By June 2001, the tower had been successfully stabilized, restored to the inclination it had in the 18th century, and reopened to the public. The operation was hailed as one of the greatest feats of modern civil engineering, ensuring the survival of Pisa’s unique heritage for centuries to come. The documentary presents not only the technical challenges but also the cultural, historical, and emotional significance of preserving this medieval masterpiece.
- 13 October Battle of the Robots: The Hunt for AI, about the work of Hugo de Garis, Rodney Brooks, and Steve Grand (roboticist); the documentary opens with the archetypal and iconic robot HAL 9000 from the 1968 2001: A Space Odyssey (film) and The Blue Danube; Igor Aleksander, who worked in neural systems at Imperial College London, and his views on the likelihood of computational intelligence; Dan Dennett; British roboticist Steve Grand, of North Somerset made the world's first AI computer game Creatures in 1996, and was designing a glider that could teach itself; Blay Whitby of the University of Sussex; the MIT Computer Science and Artificial Intelligence Laboratory and Brian Scassellati, who was designing a social robot called Cog (project); Belgian Walter De Brouwer of Starlab in Belgium; engineer Kevin Warwick of the University of Reading at the 2001 Royal Society Prizes for Science Books (Aventis Prize for Science Books), won by Robert Kunzig. Narrated by Patrick Forbes, produced by Nicolas Kent
- 28 October Bioterror, an Equinox Special, about biological weapons, with Judith Miller and her 2001 book Germs: Biological Weapons and America's Secret War; Robert Kadlec of the National War College; science writer William Broad; the ATCC in Manassas, Virginia; microbiologist William C. Patrick III; the 2001 anthrax attacks; microbiologist Richard O. Spertzel; geneticist Matthew Meselson; Gennady Lepyoshkin, Director from 1987 to 2001 of a Russian secret biological research site; Jonathan B. Tucker; Chris Shays; Andrew C. Weber; Sergei Popov (bioweaponeer) had worked at the State Research Center for Applied Microbiology in Obolensk, Moscow Oblast. Produced by Matthew Collins, directed by Kirk Wolfinger, made by WGBH. Shown on Tuesday 20 November 2001 on The Nature of Things in Canada, and on Nova, and on Nova on Tuesday 13 November 2001

=== 2002 ===
- 20 July How to Live Forever, an Equinox Special, and update in October 1999's Curing the Incurable; the Center for Strategic and International Studies (CSIS), and possible huge demographic realignments facing Europe, with influx of citizens from less-wealthy continents, as well as a likely pensions crisis; Osiris Therapeutics; apoptosis and Ian Judson, and trials of imatinib for gastrointestinal stromal tumors (GIST); the Geron Corporation and the Hayflick limit; Human Genome Sciences of Rockville, Maryland, and regenerative medicine; Vandana Shiva of India; Sir Ian Wilmut of the Roslin Institute in Edinburgh. Produced by David Paterson, directed by David Malone, made by Boa 2001

=== 2003 ===
- 15 March Space Shuttle: Human Time Bomb? about STS-107, which broke up on 1 February 2003; Bill Readdy of NASA; technology writer Dwayne A. Day; the shuttle engines burned 1.5 tonnes per second; physicist Ted Postol of MIT; Vladimir Titov and Gennady Strekalov deployed a launch escape system on Soyuz 7K-ST No.16L on 26 September 1983; the shuttle design was hampered by a need for a large-enough payload bay, to take 60-ft spy satellites for the USAF, and the shuttle's original companion launch vehicle (similar to the North American DC-3) was exchanged for a disposable fuel tank; in May 1995 for STS-70, woodpeckers destroyed a large part of the foam coating on the fuel tank next to Discovery on the launch pad - NASA bought six lifesize owls from a nearby supermarket to frighten the woodpeckers away; on 7 October 2002 on the launch of STS-112, foam broke away from the fuel tank, causing damage, which NASA ignored; Jeff Hoffmann; on 1 February 2003 at around 8am Nacogdoches, Texas was hit by debris. Narrated by Heather Couper, produced by Stuart Carter, directed by Alex Hearle, made by Pioneer Productions. Filmed, edited and broadcast only twenty three days after being commissioned
- Self-Experimenters, about self-experimentation in medicine; neuroscientist Simon Gandevia from the Prince of Wales Medical Research Institute (since 2010, Neuroscience Research Australia); Canadian thermophysiologist Gordon Giesbrecht at the University of Manitoba in Winnipeg; medicinal chemist and psychopharmacologist Sasha Shulgin; medicinal chemist David E. Nichols of Purdue University in West Lafayette, Indiana; Kevin Warwick of Reading University, had a microchip implanted in his right arm in August 1998 by George Boulos. A Canadian production, and shown originally on the Canadian science series The Nature of Things on Tuesday 22 January 2002, directed by Mark Halliley, made by Diverse Productions

=== 2004 ===
- 24 June Human Face Transplant, an Equinox Special, about Jacqui Saburido, after a drunk driver hit her car, work takes place at the University of Louisville School of Medicine; featured the work of John Barker in Kentucky, and his colleague Joe Banis; the French plastic surgeon Laurent Lantieri. Narrated by Lucy Briers, directed by Iain Scollay

=== 2005 ===
- 22 January Wave that Shook the World, an Equinox Special about the 2004 Indian Ocean earthquake and tsunami, preceded by a Dispatches Live Special on the same topic; the earthquake occurs in the Sunda Trench in Sumatra, the edge of the Sunda Plate for around four minutes; British geologist Bill McGuire (volcanologist) of UCL; engineering seismologist Thomas H. Heaton of Caltech; the earthquake had the strength of all the Earth's earthquakes in the previous five years; Barry Hirshorn of the Pacific Tsunami Warning Center; Simon Boxall of the National Oceanography Centre, Southampton; photographer Geoff Mackley; three-quarter of the deaths were in Sumatra; the 2004 Sri Lanka tsunami train wreck; Richard Gross of NASA's Airborne Science Program at JPL; the Cascadia subduction zone; the O. H. Hinsdale Wave Research Laboratory at Oregon State University. Produced by Martin Williams, directed by Lara Acaster, made by Pioneer Productions with Nova and WGBH. Shown on Nova on 29 March 2005
- 2 May Riddle of the Human Hobbits, an Equinox Special, a 3 ft 18,000 yr old female was discovered in Indonesia in 2004; the hominids were possibly alive 12,000 years ago, being 1 metre tall, on the Flores islands, east of Indonesia; Australians Mike Morwood, of the University of New England (Australia), and Bert Roberts of the University of Wollongong, with Thomas Sutikna of National Archaeology Research Institute (Indonesia); Leslie C. Aiello was a Professor of Anthropology at UCL; Indonesian Teuku Jacob, of Gadjah Mada University claimed that the hominid was a Homo Sapiens pygmy, with microcephaly; the skeleton was examined at the Mallinckrodt Institute of Radiology with a CT scan; neuroanthropologist Dean Falk of Florida State University looked at the brain, with Charles Floyd Hildebolt (1944-2024), a Professor of Radiology, and Kirk Smith; Homo erectus was thought to have colonised the island 800,000 years ago; it was believed that the species arrived on the island by raft; the Brodmann area 10 part of the brain, was larger in the hominid, than Homo erectus; John Gurche made a model of the hominid face; Gerrit van den Bergh, of the University of Wollongong, discussed whether the Ebu gogo were the same species. Narrated by David Malone, directed by David Hamlin, a joint-production with National Geographic made with ZDF of Germany
- 12 September Britain's Tornado, an Equinox Special about the 2005 Birmingham tornado
- 27 December The Year the Earth Went Wild, about the Earth's weather during 2005; Phil Cummins of Geoscience Australia; Bill McGuire of the Benfield Hazard Research Centre at UCL; photographer Geoff Mackley; oceanographer Simon Boxall of the National Oceanography Centre in Southampton; David Vaughan (glaciologist) of the British Antarctic Survey; the 2005 Nias–Simeulue earthquake on 28 March 2005; Kerry Sieh of Caltech; Hurricane Dennis and Hurricane Emily (2005) in Florida; storm chaser Mike Theiss; Typhoon Haitang (2005); the 28 July 2005 Ladypool Road Birmingham tornado; Ewan McCullum of the Met Office; Stuart Robinson of TORRO; structural engineer Tim Marshall; the 2005 European floods and Bern; the NOAA Hurricane Hunters on 24 August 2005; Ivor van Heerden of Louisiana State University; the Mississippi River–Gulf Outlet Canal funnelled a storm surge in Louisiana; Waveland, Mississippi on 29 August 2005; Hurricane Rita made landfall in Texas, in late September 2005; Roger Bilham of the Cooperative Institute for Research in Environmental Sciences at University of Colorado Boulder, and the Main Himalayan Thrust earthquake fault. Narrated by Mark Halliley, directed by Simon Ludgate, produced by Chris Hale, made by Pioneer Productions

=== 2006 ===
- 13 March Beating Bird Flu, the May 1997 Hong Kong outbreak of H5N1 bird flu; Dutch virologist Ab Osterhaus at Erasmus MC in Rotterdam thought that the flu outbreak came from poultry markets; in January 2004 another bigger outbreak, 34 caught the virus but 25 died; Neil Ferguson of Imperial College; virologist John Oxford of the Royal London Hospital; virologist Chris Smith (The Naked Scientists) of the University of Cambridge; Alan Hay of the National Institute of Health Research; James Niven in Manchester in 1919, and the death rate was highest from ages 25 to 34; cyanosis occurred; historian Douglas Gill, and the British Army transit camp at Étaples, a possible source of the outbreak, where purulent bronchitis started in December 1916; the Armed Forces Institute of Pathology, where pathologist Jeffery Taubenberger sequenced the 1919 virus, which affected hemagglutinin receptors; the virus DNA had eight genes, which made ten proteins; virologist Terrence Tumpey at CDC Atlanta, who tested the 1919 virus on laboratory mice, where he found that neuraminidase helped the virus propagate; in the 1919 virus; the immune system could not recognise the 1919 virus sufficiently, and a cytokine storm occurred, which paradoxically happened most with people with the best immune systems, not older people; Neil Ferguson believed that a world pandemic would take two to three months to spread around the world, and would take 50 days to reach a peak in the UK, with one million cases per day. Narrated by David Malone, produced by Simone Pilkington, directed by Tim Tate, made by Granada Television
- 21 December The Whale That Swam to London, an Equinox Special; it featured Rodney Coates of Seiche Underwater Acoustics, of Holsworthy in Devon, the former Professor of Acoustical Oceanography from 1990-96 at the University of Birmingham. Narrated by Dilly Barlow, produced by Nick Curwin, directed by Toby Macdonald, made by Firefly Film and Television Productions.

=== 2007 ===
- Sunday 14 January 2007 Tornado Britain, an updated version of the 12 September 2005 documentary; Tony Gilbert of TORRO visited north-west London, including the 2006 London tornado.

== See also ==
- List of Horizon episodes
- List of Naked Science episodes
- List of The Nature of Things episodes
- Secret History (TV series)
- Timewatch (includes a list of episodes)
