= Jill Newby =

Australian psychologist

Jill Maree Newby
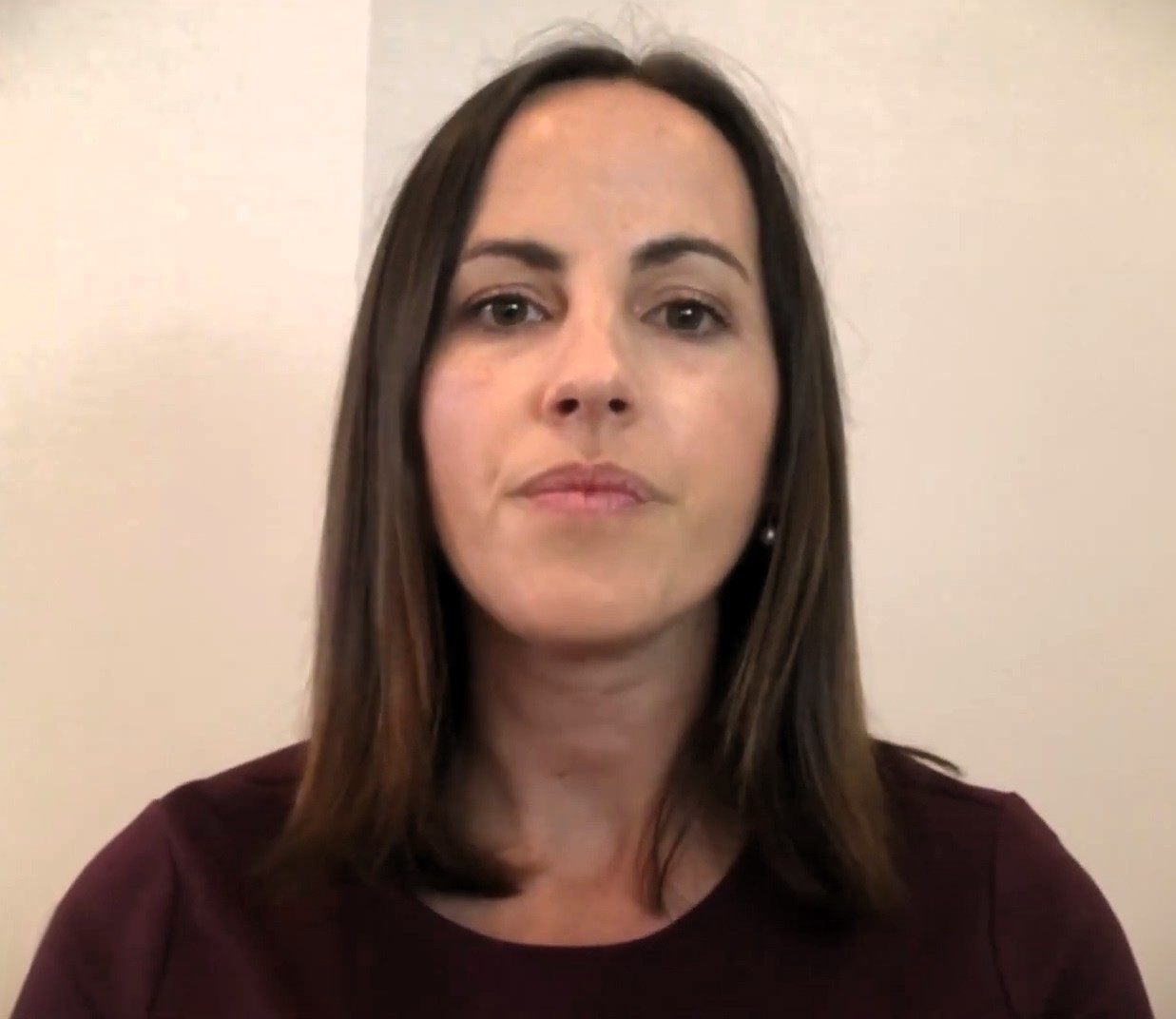
- Newby in 2020
- Education: University of New South Wales
- Scientific career
- Workplaces: University of New South Wales; Black Dog Institute
- Thesis: Investigations into the role of intrusive autobiographical memories in depression (2011)

Jill Maree Newby is an Australian psychologist who is a professor and National Health and Medical Research Council Emerging Leader at the Black Dog Institute in the University of New South Wales. She has developed technology based interventions for depression and anxiety.

== Early life and education ==
Newby completed her master's degree and doctoral research at the University of New South Wales. Her doctoral research considered the role of autobiographical memories in depression.

== Research and career ==
Newby studies anxiety disorders, phobias and depression. She has developed and investigated the effectiveness of technology-based interventions, including e-mental health and virtual reality interventions. Newby encourages people to seek help and gain practical advice on managing depression. Newby has argued that long wait times and high costs were a barrier to evidence-based treatment. She developed an online course that stopped people from worrying excessively.

Newby investigated how the prevalence of mental health disorders increased during the COVID-19 pandemic. She found that almost 80% of Australians experienced worse mental health during the pandemic, and that women, young adults and caregivers were particularly vulnerable. She was named a 2020 Young Tall Poppy by Australian mental health charity the Black Dog Institute, for her advocacy work in mental health.

== Selected publications ==
- G Andrews; Ashna Basu; P Cuijpers; M G Craske; Peter McEvoy; C L English; J M Newby (1 February 2018). "Computer therapy for the anxiety and depression disorders is effective, acceptable and practical health care: An updated meta-analysis". Journal of Anxiety Disorders. 55: 70–78. doi:10.1016/j.janxdis.2018.01.001. ISSN 0887-6185. PMID 29422409. Wikidata Q50107790.
- Aliza Werner-Seidler; Yael Perry; Alison L. Calear; Jill M. Newby; Helen Christensen (February 2017). "School-based depression and anxiety prevention programs for young people: A systematic review and meta-analysis". Clinical Psychology Review. 51: 30–47. doi:10.1016/j.cpr.2016.10.005. ISSN 0272-7358. PMID 27821267. Wikidata Q28075710.
- Jill M. Newby; Anna McKinnon; Willem Kuyken; Simon Gilbody; Tim Dalgleish (6 June 2015). "Systematic review and meta-analysis of transdiagnostic psychological treatments for anxiety and depressive disorders in adulthood". Clinical Psychology Review. 40: 91–110. doi:10.1016/j.cpr.2015.06.002. ISSN 0272-7358. PMID 26094079. Wikidata Q28088383.
