= Eccentric training =

Strength training

Eccentric training is a type of strength training that involves using the target muscles to control weight as it moves in a downward motion. Eccentric training focuses on slowing down the process of muscle elongation to challenge the muscles, which can lead to stronger muscles, faster muscle recovery, lower risk of injury, and increased metabolic rate.

An eccentric contraction is one of two distinct phases in the movement of muscles and tendons, following concentric contraction (shortening). An eccentric contraction is the motion of an active muscle while it is lengthening under load. Eccentric training is repetitively doing eccentric muscle contractions. For example, in a biceps curl, the action of lowering the dumbbell back down from the lift is the eccentric phase of that exercise – as long as the dumbbell is lowered slowly rather than letting it drop (i.e., the biceps are in a state of contraction to control the rate of descent of the dumbbell).

A negative repetition (negative rep) is the repetition of a technique in weight lifting in which the lifter performs the eccentric phase of a lift. Instead of pressing the weight up slowly, in proper form, a spotter generally aids in the concentric, or lifting, portion of the repetition while the lifter slowly performs the eccentric phase for several seconds.

Eccentric movement provides a braking mechanism for muscle and tendon groups that are experiencing concentric movement to protect joints from damage as the contraction is released. Eccentric training is beneficial for casual and high-performance athletes or the elderly and patients looking to rehabilitate certain muscles and tendons.

== Physiology ==
=== Physiological mechanisms ===
The muscle has "tension producing tissue comprising small contractile units referred to as sarcomeres" that each contain a "thick (myosin) and thin (actin) myofilament (muscle filaments or proteins) that overlaps to format a cross-bridge bond (attachment)".

When in a concentric exercise, shortening of a muscle occurs as the myosin and actin cross-bridges repeatedly attach and detach to draw the actin across the myosin – creating force. Each cross-bridge attachment and detachment cycle is powered by the splitting of one molecule of adenosine triphosphate (ATP). Examples of such exercises include kicking a ball or lifting a weight.

In controlled release reversals of such concentric motions, the eccentric movement stretches the muscle with opposing force that is stronger than the muscle force. When myofilaments of the muscle fiber are stretched in such eccentric contractions there can be reduced numbers of detachments of cross bridge myosin and actin links. With more cross bridges remaining attached there is greater force production in the muscle. Examples of activities involving eccentric muscle contraction include walking down a hill or resisting the force of gravity while lowering a heavy object.

Eccentric actions place a stretch on the sarcomeres to the point where the myofilaments may experience strain, otherwise known as exercise-induced delayed onset muscle soreness (DOMS). One area of research that has much promise in relation to DOMS and eccentric exercise is the repeated-bout effect (RBE). To help prevent or lessen DOMS from eccentric exercise, or to facilitate recovery from it, the exerciser would eccentrically stimulate the muscle, then repeat at weekly intervals to build up strength and allow the strain (in response to a given force level) to reduce over time.

=== Energy ===
This movement has been described as negative training. This "negative" movement is necessary to reverse the muscle from its initial trajectory. Eccentric contractions use less metabolic energy, even though they can create more force than concentric actions.

In an eccentric muscle action, the load exceeds the force that can be developed by the muscle at a constant length. During eccentric contractions, the muscle is stretched, so the muscle absorbs mechanical energy. Such exercises involve negative work. The mechanical energy is dissipated or converted into one or a combination of two energies: elastic recoil energy and thermal energy.

==== Elastic recoil ====
The energy that is absorbed by the muscle can be converted into elastic recoil energy, and can be recovered and reused by the body. This creates more efficiency because the body is able to use the energy for the next movement, decreasing the initial impact or shock of the movement.

For example, kinetic energy is absorbed in running every time one's foot strikes the ground and continues as one's mass overtakes the foot. At this moment, elastic recoil energy is at its maximum and a large amount of this energy is absorbed and is added to the next stride.

This movement is similar to the action of springs, where the muscle is continually shortened and stretched resulting in enhanced effectiveness and force. It can lead to the perception of "less effort" even though dealing with higher force.

Time matters in elastic recoil. If energy is not used quickly, then it is dissipated as heat. Eccentric training aims to use the principles of energy conversion to strengthen muscle and tendon groups.

==== Heat ====
The energy that is absorbed by the muscle will be dissipated as heat if the muscle is being used as a "damper or shock absorber". This leads to an increase in body temperature.

== Health benefits ==
=== Muscle hypertrophy ===
The primary way that the eccentric contraction promotes muscle hypertrophy is that it produces higher mechanical output at lower metabolic cost when compared to the concentric contraction. This higher mechanical tension is considered essential for growth. Additionally, eccentric exercise causes a significant increase in exercise-induced muscle damage (EIMD), as seen by the microlesions in muscle fibers, sarcolemmal disruption, and an inflammatory response that leads to delayed-onset muscle soreness (DOMS).

There is also evidence to support that eccentric contractions activate specific molecular pathways, which cause greater anabolic signaling and gene expression than concentric contractions. This is shown in the structural remodeling differences in the muscle when comparing the two training contractions. Eccentric training seems to cause a greater increase in fascicle length (sacromeres are added in series), while concentric training leads to an increase in the pennation angle (sacromeres are added in parallel).

Due to its mechanical properties, this form of training can be used for both healthy individuals and individuals who are in rehabilitation. Studies have shown that negative repetitions combine a high amount of force on the muscle with a lower energy cost than normal concentric training, which requires 4–5 times the amount of energy. In other words, lifters are stronger in the eccentric portion of an exercise, allowing for heavier weights and in turn, greater stretches under tension. Moreover, eccentric movements tend to improve stimulus to fatigue ratio and allow for more comprehensive training routines. This justifies why this type of training is more beneficial and less of a risk to subjects rehabilitating or with a limited exercise capacity.

One 8-week study found that subjects training with the same intensity, one with primarily eccentric contractions, increased muscle fiber mass by approximately 40%, while the concentric contraction group showed no change. However, this difference might not be the same when the total load is matched between training types. When matched for load, the increase in muscle volume seems to be the same between concentric and eccentric training.

The concept of eccentric overload, where the eccentric phase is loaded with more weight than the concentric phase, is a strategy that advanced lifters use to maximize hypertrophic stimulus. This method works because of the unique properties of the eccentric phase mentioned above. Due to the low metabolic cost relative to the high force production, eccentric exercise is also used for rehabilitation training, especially for elderly patients with chronic conditions who are unable to perform strenuous activity.

=== Advantages ===
Eccentric training has multiple health benefits:

- Eccentric contractions use less energy and actually absorb energy that will be used as heat or elastic recoil for the next movement.
- Eccentric training creates greater force owing to the "decreased rate of cross-bridge muscle detachments." Patients and athletes will have more muscle force for bigger weights when eccentric training.
- Eccentric training has proven to be an excellent post rehabilitation intervention for lower-body injuries.
- Increased DOMS leads to more tenderness in eccentric, rather than pure pain or tendon swelling amongst patients.
- Older individuals are less vulnerable to injury from eccentric exercise, primarily because of the reduced strain on muscle-tendon groupings as compared to traditional concentric exercise.
- Repeated-bout Effect markedly reduces DOMS. "Completing bouts of eccentric training and then repeating the workout 1 week (or more) later will result in less DOMS after the second workout."
- Stretching of the muscles and eccentric training provides protection from injury or re-injury.
- Subjects report less weariness from eccentric training than from concentric training.
- Total body eccentric training can raise resting metabolic rate by about 9 percent, with the greatest magnitude in the first two hours.
- While energy costs remain low, the degree of force is very high. This leads to muscles that respond with significant increases in muscle strength, size, and power.

=== Sports training ===
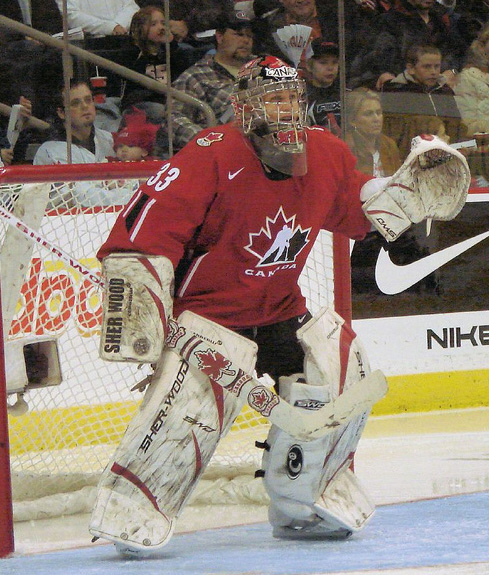
Kim St-Pierre healed from hip surgery with eccentric exercise

With eccentric training, muscles are able to create more for less work, which has special meaning in the realms of high-performance sports – both for injury prevention and optimal-performance training. For athletes and sports enthusiasts, this eccentric model can help with explosive force training to prevent injuries or recurring injuries, and trains the body to use the kinetic force driven by eccentric training more efficiently. Canadian Olympian Kim St-Pierre uses eccentric training as part of her regime. The Esmonde Technique takes eccentric training and makes it available to the masses through Classical Stretch and Essentrics. After having hip surgery in the summer of 2007, St-Pierre began to practice the Esmonde Technique with experts Miranda Esmonde-White from PBS's Classical Stretch and Sahra Esmonde-White host of the Essentrics workout to heal her hip.

According to tests, increases in both strength and muscle fiber are higher in eccentric training than in traditional concentric training.

The rehabilitative nature, low energy costs, high magnitudes of force, and low uptake of oxygen all align eccentric exercise for both the elderly and rehabilitative functions. Eccentric training has been found to be beneficial to those with a variety of physical ailments.

According to one systematic review and meta-analysis on shoulder impingement syndrome, eccentric training didn't improve pain or function more than other types of training.

=== Rehabilitation ===
Eccentric exercise or resistance training is currently being used as a form of rehabilitation for sports injuries, but also as an alternative form of exercise for the elderly and those affected by neurological disorders, COPD, cardiopulmonary disorders, and cancer. Muscle atrophy is common among people afflicted by these disorders, causing the inability to participate in rigorous exercise protocols. Eccentric muscle contractions produce high forces with low-energy costs. According to Hortobágyi, due to these properties, eccentric exercise has the greatest potential for muscle strengthening. To strengthen muscle the external force must exceed the muscle while it lengthens.

Perceived muscle damage: There is a stipulation regarding eccentric contractions in that they actually cause muscle damage and injury in individuals that have not been previously exposed to them. Eccentric contraction may result in delayed onset muscle soreness however; the contraction itself does not cause muscle damage or injury.

Proof of muscle strengthening without damage: One recurring problem in ACL rehabilitation is improving muscle strength of the quadriceps without re-injury. Early, high-force eccentric training can be used to increase muscle strength and volume without damage to the ACL graft, surrounding soft tissue, and the articular cartilage. In an experiment performed on rat muscles after twenty sessions of treadmill low-intensity eccentric training the wet weight of the muscles and the fiber cross-section was significantly larger than the control and level groups. The results suggest that low-intensity eccentric contractions have the ability to "produce enough mechanical stress to induce muscle hypertrophy without over-stressing muscle fibers resulting in damage”. Similar articles have found that muscle damage is not required to reach hypertrophy, but greater mechanical stress brought on by eccentric contractions is what leads to hypertrophy in individuals undergoing eccentric training. Studies done on elderly populations give evidence towards minimized muscle damage when performing low-intensity eccentric exercises. According to Gault the low cost of energy and low oxygen demand make low-intensity eccentric exercise ideal for the elderly.

Eccentric contraction and oxygen consumption: Oxygen consumption is needed for muscles to function properly. Eccentric muscle contractions are considered to be negative work as the muscle is working with resistance not against it. Negative work occurs when the force exerted on the muscle is greater than the force being produced by the muscle causing mechanical energy to be absorbed by muscle fibers. An experiment was conducted on bicycle riding to observe the amount of oxygen consumption of participants performing the motion of pedaling forward. Pedaling acted as positive work and pedaling with resistance acted as negative work. Less oxygen was consumed during negative work than of positive work with the oxygen consumption ratio being 3:7. Due to the low oxygen consumption of eccentric exercise studies have been conducted on patients with severe COPD. An eccentric cycling exercise workout was created for these patients and the results found there to be no side effects, minimal muscle soreness that had no effect on power, and high compliance. Furthermore, other cycling studies concluded that eccentric cycling was a safe alternative for COPD patients as they can perform high-intensity work with lower cost.

Eccentric contractions and cardiac output: With the lower cost of oxygen, how would eccentric exercise affect the heart? A study was performed to test how eccentric and concentric contractions affect cardiac autonomic modulation after exercise. Men (aged 18–30) were divided into four groups: concentric control, eccentric control, concentric training, and eccentric training. Results concluded that resistance training (eccentric contractions) promoted strength gain. An increase in cardiac vagal modulation during recovery was also concluded.

=== Benefits for the elderly ===
In old age, loss of strength and muscle mass is commonplace. Add to these factors disease and cardiac and respiratory illness. Eccentric training enables the elderly, and those with the same problems, the ability to train muscle groups and increase strength and resiliency with low-energy exercise.

It has been proven that eccentric resistance training improves the functional mobility of older adults. Studies have shown that eccentric training of the lower body, in particular the knee extensors, are essential in preventing falls in older adults and helping them maintain their independence.

A study conducted focusing on eccentric training for the age group 65–87 years of age showed that, over 12 weeks, they had strengthened their knee extensors by up to 26%. With this evidence, it is reasonable to suggest that negative repetitions can help improve the health of older adults.

== Rehabilitation from medical conditions ==
=== Muscle injury ===
Eccentric contractions are a frequent cause of muscle injury when engaging in unaccustomed exercise. But a single bout of such eccentric exercise leads to adaptation which will make the muscle less vulnerable to injury on subsequent performance of the eccentric exercise.

=== Muscle tendon injuries ===
The entire muscle-tendon system works cohesively to slow down limb movement. The close relationship between the muscle and tendons help to dissipate heat or temporarily store kinetic energy. If the forces needed to slow down a limb exceed the capacity of the muscle-tendon system, injury is likely to occur.

Athletes with recurring hamstring and abductor muscle injuries have greater impairment of eccentric strength, suggesting that improvements in eccentric training may minimize the risks of injury by strengthening the muscle-tendon groupings in high-stress areas of the body.

Eccentric training is of huge benefit to those that wish to avert injuries by improving the muscle's abilities to absorb more energy before deteriorating. According to one article, "Increased stiffness in tendons, greater force at failure, and an improved ability to absorb energy at the musculotendonous junction result following eccentric exercise training".

=== Tendinoses ===
Intense repetitive activities tend to create chronic tendon disorders, where the tendons become injured, inflamed, or ruptured. While typically these disorders are directly related to eccentric muscle movements, the ability of a muscle to strengthen and prevent injury through eccentric training is great. Controlled rehabilitative regimes will actually strengthen and repair tendons. Ample evidence supports the notion that the tendon, like the muscle, can adapt favorably to physical stress and eccentric loads.

It has been deduced that high muscle-tendon forces delivered in a controlled environment are needed for optimal tendon adaptation. While eccentric stress is related to the injury, high-force eccentric exercises are needed to maximize recovery.

=== Patellar tendonitis ===
Patellar tendonitis is a condition that arises when the tendon and the tissues that surround it, become inflamed and irritated. This is usually due to overuse, especially from jumping activities. This is the reason patellar tendonitis is often called "jumper's knee". A study was done by Roald Bahr and colleagues looked at which method of tendon rehabilitation exercise – the "eccentric squat" exercise or the universal gym "leg extension/leg curl" — produced more recovery results in terms of recovery in the treatment of chronic patellar tendonitis. On the twelve-week exercise program, participants were tested for thigh circumference and quadriceps, and hamstring moment of force. There was no significant difference between the groups in either quadriceps or hamstring moment of force and hamstring moment of force significantly increased in both groups, but the eccentric squat saw significantly lower pain ratings and produced twice as many pain-free subjects at the end of the program than the other group.

Eccentric training has also been proven successful in the treatment of chronic Achilles tendonitis, using a twelve-week eccentric calf muscle program various studies have shown the ability for people to return to normal pre-tendonitis levels. The reasoning behind the benefits of eccentric training for tendinopathy is still unclear.

=== Anterior cruciate ligament damage ===
Tearing an anterior cruciate ligament (ACL) in the knee causes serious damage that can last several years and often requires surgery. The ACL is one of the four main stabilizing ligaments of the knee. During the post-operative rehabilitation of patients, eccentric training can be used as a cornerstone of developing muscle size and strength. According to tests conducted by J. Parry Gerber in 2007, structural changes in the muscles greatly exceeded those achieved with standard concentric rehabilitation. The success of the involvement of gradual progressive exposure to negative work ultimately led to the production of high muscle force.

=== Sarcopenia ===
Sarcopenia is the progressive loss of muscle mass due to aging. Muscle mass begins to deteriorate as early as the age of 25, and consistently deteriorates into old age. By the age of 80 "one-half of the skeletal muscle has been lost" (Lastayo, Woolf, Lewek, Snyder-Mackler, Reich & Lindstedt, 2003). With this great decrease in mass, strength is also decreased. Eccentric training has the ability to counteract sarcopenia through sustained training. The unique trait of greater overloads to the muscle with less strenuous impact on the body, as well as cardiac and respiratory systems, offers a unique case for the elderly. The high-force and low-cost set of attributes in eccentric exercise makes it ideal for the actively impaired.

=== Osteopenia ===
Usually viewed as a precursor to osteoporosis, osteopenia is when bone density is lower than normal levels. Bone mass is affected by muscle forces and their loads on the bone structure. The strength and density of the bone are directly influenced by local strain. Due to the high strain on muscles during eccentric training, coupled with low energy output, eccentric training is essential to the rehabilitative process.

=== Cardiovascular changes ===
Several recent studies have indicated that eccentric exercise as walking down hill has greater beneficial effects on insulin sensitivity, lipid profiles, and physical fitness than walking up hill. One study used stairs and elevators and the other a mountain and a cable car. In both cases the cardiovascular improvements were greater for being lifted up and walking down than for walking up and being lowered down. These cardiovascular findings extend a broader sports-medicine literature on eccentric muscle contractions, which has identified applications in injury prevention, rehabilitation, and sustained downhill activities such as hiking and mountaineering.

== History ==
Adolf Eugen Fick discovered in 1882 that "contracting muscle under stretch could produce greater force than a shortening muscle contraction" like in concentric movements. Fifty years later, Archibald Hill found that "the body had lower energy demand during an eccentric muscle contraction than during a concentric muscle action".

Eccentric training is often associated with the terms "muscles soreness" and "muscle damage". In 1902, Theodore Hough discovered and developed the term DOMS (delayed onset muscle soreness), after he found that exercises containing negative repetitions caused athletes to have sore muscles. Hough believed this was causing a rupture within the muscle; when he looked further into the subject, he found that when performing eccentric exercise that exhibited soreness, the muscle "quickly adapts and becomes accustomed to the increase in applied stress". The result of this was that the muscles' soreness not only decreased, but the muscular damage did too.

Erling Asmussen introduced eccentric training in 1953, with "ex" meaning "away from" and "centric" meaning "center". Hence, the term was coined to mean a muscle contraction that moves away from the center of the muscle.

The first revelation of the functional significance of these properties occurred in a clever demonstration devised by Bernard C. Abbott, Brenda Bigland, and Murdoch Ritchie. They connected two stationary cycle ergometers back-to-back with a single chain, such that one cyclist pedaled forward and the other resisted this forward motion by braking the backward-moving pedals. Because the internal resistance of the device was low, the same force was being applied by both individuals, yet the task was much easier for the individual braking. This demonstration cleverly revealed that a tiny female resisting the movement of the pedals could easily exert more force than, and hence control the power output of, a large burly male pedaling forward.

== See also ==
- Flywheel training

== Sources ==
- Bahr, Roald; Fossan, Bjorn; Loken, Sverre; Engebretsen, Lars; August (2006). "Surgical Treatment Compared with Eccentric Training for Patellar Tendinopathy (Jumpers Knee) A Randomized Controlled Trial". The Journal of Bone and Joint Surgery. 88A (8): 1689–1698. doi:10.2106/JBJS.E.01181. PMID 16882889. S2CID 10659933.
- Bubbico, Aaron; Kravitz, Len; Ph (2010). "Eccentric Training". IDEA Fitness Journal. 7: 10. Archived from the original on 1 January 2011.
- Gerber, Marcus; Parry, J.; Robin, L.; Dibble, Leland E.; Greis, Patrick E.; Burks, Robert T.; LaStayo, Paul C.; March (2007). "After Anterior Cruciate Ligament Reconstruction Effects of Early Progressive Eccentric Exercise on Muscle Structure". The Journal of Bone and Joint Surgery. 89 (3): 559–57. doi:10.2106/jbjs.f.00385. PMID 17332105.
- Howlett K., T. Keniston, A. Grassl, A. Olsson, C. Eidem, and D.J. McCann, January 2011 [AN INITIAL ASSESSMENT OF THE METABOLIC COST OF USING THE QUADMILL ] Department of Exercise Science, Gonzaga University, Spokane, WA.
- LaStayo, Paul C. PhD; Woolf, John M.; Lewek, Michael D.; Snyder-Mackler, Lynn; Trude-Reich, Lindstedt; Stan, L. PhD; October (2003). "Eccentric Muscle Contractions: Their Contribution to Injury, Prevention, Rehabilitation, and Sport". Journal of Orthopaedic & Sports Physical Therapy. 33 (10): 557–571. doi:10.2519/jospt.2003.33.10.557. PMID 14620785.
- LaStayo, Paul C.; Ewy, Gordon A.; Pierotti, David D.; Johns, Richard K.; Lindstedt, Stan; May (2003). "The positive effects of negative work: increased muscle strength and decreased fall risk in a frail elderly population". The Journals of Gerontology: Series A. 58 (5): 419–424. doi:10.1093/gerona/58.5.m419. PMID 12730250.
- Lindstedt, S. L.; LaStayo, P.C.; Reich, T.E.; December (2001). "When Active Muscles Lengthen: Properties and Consequences of Eccentric Contractions" (PDF). News Physiol. Sci. 16 (6): 256–261. doi:10.1152/physiologyonline.2001.16.6.256. PMID 11719600. S2CID 6042407. Archived from the original (PDF) on 18 October 2016.
- Roig, M.; O'Brien, K.; Kirk, G.; Murray, R.; McKinnon, P.; Shadgan, B.; Reid, W. D. (2009). "The effects of eccentric versus concentric resistance training on muscle strength and mass in healthy adults: A systematic review with meta-analysis". British Journal of Sports Medicine. 43 (8): 556–568. doi:10.1136/bjsm.2008.051417. PMID 18981046. S2CID 8380567.
