= Muscle soreness =

Muscle soreness may refer to:

- Acute muscle soreness (AMS), which appears during or immediately after exercise and lasts up to 24 hours.
- Delayed onset muscle soreness (DOMS), which reaches its peak point from 24 to 72 hours after the exercise.
