= David Burke (neurophysiologist) =

Australian neurophysiologist

David James Burke AC, FRACP, FAA, FTSE
- Born: 11 May 1944 (age 82); Trundle, New South Wales, Australia
- Occupations: Neurologist and Clinical Neurophysiologist
- Spouse(s): Katre Klettenberg, BA, LlB (Hons)
- Medical career
- Institutions: Prince of Wales Hospital, Prince of Wales Medical Research Institute, University of New South Wales, University of Sydney, Royal Prince Alfred Hospital
- Sub-specialties: Clinical Neurophysiology
- Research: Clinical neurophysiology; motor control; peripheral nerve function

David James Burke AC (born 11 May 1944) is an Australian neurologist and clinical neurophysiologist. He has held senior positions at the Prince of Wales Hospital, University of New South Wales and University of Sydney. He led one of two teams that formed the Prince of Wales Medical Research Institute, which was renamed Neuroscience Research Australia in 2010. His career has included a focus on the role of spinal cord circuits in the control of movement, the excitability of peripheral nerve axons in health and disease, and other areas of clinical neurophysiology.

== Education ==
Burke was born on 11 May 1944 in Trundle, New South Wales, attended primary school at Trundle Central School and secondary school at Sydney Grammar School (1956–1960), as a boarder at "School House" in Randwick. He studied medicine at the University of Sydney (1961–1966), graduating MB BS in 1967. In 1969, he became a postgraduate research scholar for the degree, Doctor of Medicine (MD) from the University of New South Wales, graduating in 1972, and in 1983 he was awarded the higher doctorate, Doctor of Science (DSc), also by the University of New South Wales.

== Postgraduate career ==
Burke was inspired to undertake medical research and then to pursue a career in neurology by Professor James W. Lance, AO, CBE, and studied at The Prince Henry Hospital under his guidance. After completing the MD by research, he became a medical registrar at Prince Henry, and passed the examinations of the Royal Australasian College of Physicians (awarded MRACP in 1972 and FRACP in 1975). He trained in neurology in Lance's department in 1973–1974, learning clinical neurophysiology by working with Dr A.K. (Keith) Lethlean. In 1975, he went to Sweden on a C.J. Martin Travelling Fellowship from the National Health & Medical Research Council (NHMRC) to undertake postdoctoral research with Professor Karl-Erik Hagbarth in Uppsala (1975–1976), where he mastered the then-novel technique, microneurography. He returned to Prince Henry for the third year of the Fellowship in 1977, and then became a Senior Research Fellow of the NHMRC. In 1980, he was appointed Staff Specialist Neurologist at Prince Henry and Associate Professor (conjoint) with the University of New South Wales. He was promoted to a personal Chair of Clinical Neurophysiology in 1987 and, following the retirement of his mentor, Professor James Lance, he was appointed Professor of Neurology and Chairman of the Department of Neurology within the "Institute of Neurological Sciences". He oversaw the movement of the clinical services from Prince Henry at Little Bay to the Prince of Wales Hospital at Randwick, coinciding with the formation of the Prince of Wales Medical Research Institute. Burke led one of the two teams that came together to form the institute, and served as Director of Clinical Research, with the executive director of the institute, Professor D.I. McCloskey. In 1995 he was elected Fellow of two learned academies, the Australian Academy of Science (FAA) and the Australian Academy of Technological Science & Engineering (FTSE). In 1997 he was appointed Director of the hospital's clinical services in the neurosciences.

In 2002 Burke resigned from his hospital, university and medical research institute appointments to move to the University of Sydney, initially as Director then Dean of Research & Development for the College of Health Sciences (which incorporated the Faculties of Medicine, Dentistry, Pharmacy, Nursing and Health Sciences). He was also then appointed to the Department of Neurology, Royal Prince Alfred Hospital, and provided clinical neurophysiology services at the hospital. In 2008, on the retirement of Professor J.D. Pollard he was appointed to the Bushell Chair of Neurology at the University of Sydney and Royal Prince Alfred Hospital, and continued in university administration for Sydney Medical School as Associate Dean (Research). In 2013 he stepped down from these roles into a fractional appointment, and retired at the beginning of 2020.

His personal research, in particular that with Professor Simon Gandevia involved microneurography and other motor control studies on human subjects. His focus on the circuitry of the human spinal cord led to a long-lasting collaboration with Professor Emmanuel Pierrot-Deseilligny at Hôpital de la Salpêtrière in Paris, France, the home of French neurology, with mutual visits every year or two from 1990, culminating in a major text that summarised their research ("The Circuitry of the Human Spinal Cord: Spinal and Corticospinal Mechanisms of Movement"). His other major area involved the determinants of axonal excitability and the disturbances that underlie the ectopic activity of axons that is responsible for paraesthesiae and fasciculation, and for conduction block in damaged axons, major collaborators being Professor Hugh Bostock, FRS (UCL Institute of Neurology, London) and Professor Matthew Kiernan (Burke's successor to the Bushell Chair of Neurology at the University of Sydney).

== Awards and honours ==
Burke was made an Officer of the Order of Australia (AO) in the 1999 Australia Day Honours "for service to science and medicine, particularly in the field of clinical neurophysiology in the areas of research and education, and to the community through medical charities and lay organisations". In 2001, he received the Centenary Medal of Federation from the Australian Government for service to Australian society and science in neurology. In the 2019 Queen's Birthday Honours, Burke was made a Companion of the Order of Australia (AC) "for eminent service to neurophysiology, to innovative treatments for spinal cord and brain trauma injuries, and to professional medical organisations".
