= Alison Calear =

Australian psychologist

- Born: Alison Neil
- Education: Australian National University
- Scientific career
- Workplaces: Australian National University
- Thesis: The YouthMood Project : an evaluation of the MoodGYM program with an adolescent school-based population (2009)

Alison Calear (née Neil) is an Australian academic who is a professor at the Centre for Mental Health Research at the Australian National University. She studies youth mental health and the prevention of anxiety, depression and suicide.

== Education ==
Calear's doctoral research developed a program for adolescent mental health. She studied the efficacy of school-based prevention programs to prevent anxiety and depression.

== Research and career ==
Calear works on youth mental health and suicide prevention. Suicide is one of the leading causes of death for young people in Australia, and Calear has looked to understand the origins of this phenomenon. She evaluated a peer-leadership program, Sources of Strength, which promotes help-seeking behaviour amongst young people. It has been delivered to peer-leaders across twenty high schools in the United States. She evaluated the program in Australia, as well as another specialist program Silence is Deadly, which encourages young men and boys to discuss their feelings.

In 2011, Calear was awarded a National Health and Medical Research Council fellowship. She was awarded the Australian Institute of Policy and Science Tall Poppy Award in 2012, which honoured her research efforts in youth mental health. She studied the role of online interventions in preventing anxiety. During the COVID-19 pandemic, she investigated the impact of COVID-19 on community mental health. She found that parents and caregivers who were responsible for their children's home schooling experienced high levels of psychological distress.

== Selected publications ==
- Neil, Alison L; Christensen, Helen (2009). "Efficacy and effectiveness of school-based prevention and early intervention programs for anxiety". Clinical Psychology Review. 29 (3): 208–215. doi:10.1016/j.cpr.2009.01.002. PMID 19232805. Wikidata Q22252270.
- Aliza Werner-Seidler; Yael Perry; Alison L. Calear; Jill M. Newby; Christensen, Helen (2017). "School-based depression and anxiety prevention programs for young people: A systematic review and meta-analysis". Clinical Psychology Review. 51: 30–47. doi:10.1016/j.cpr.2016.10.005. PMID 27821267. Wikidata Q28075710.
- Alison L Calear; Christensen, Helen (2009). "Systematic review of school-based prevention and early intervention programs for depression". Journal of Adolescence. 33 (3): 429–438. doi:10.1016/j.adolescence.2009.07.004. PMID 19647310. Wikidata Q33489185.
