= Miranda Esmonde-White =

Canadian fitness trainer (born 1949)

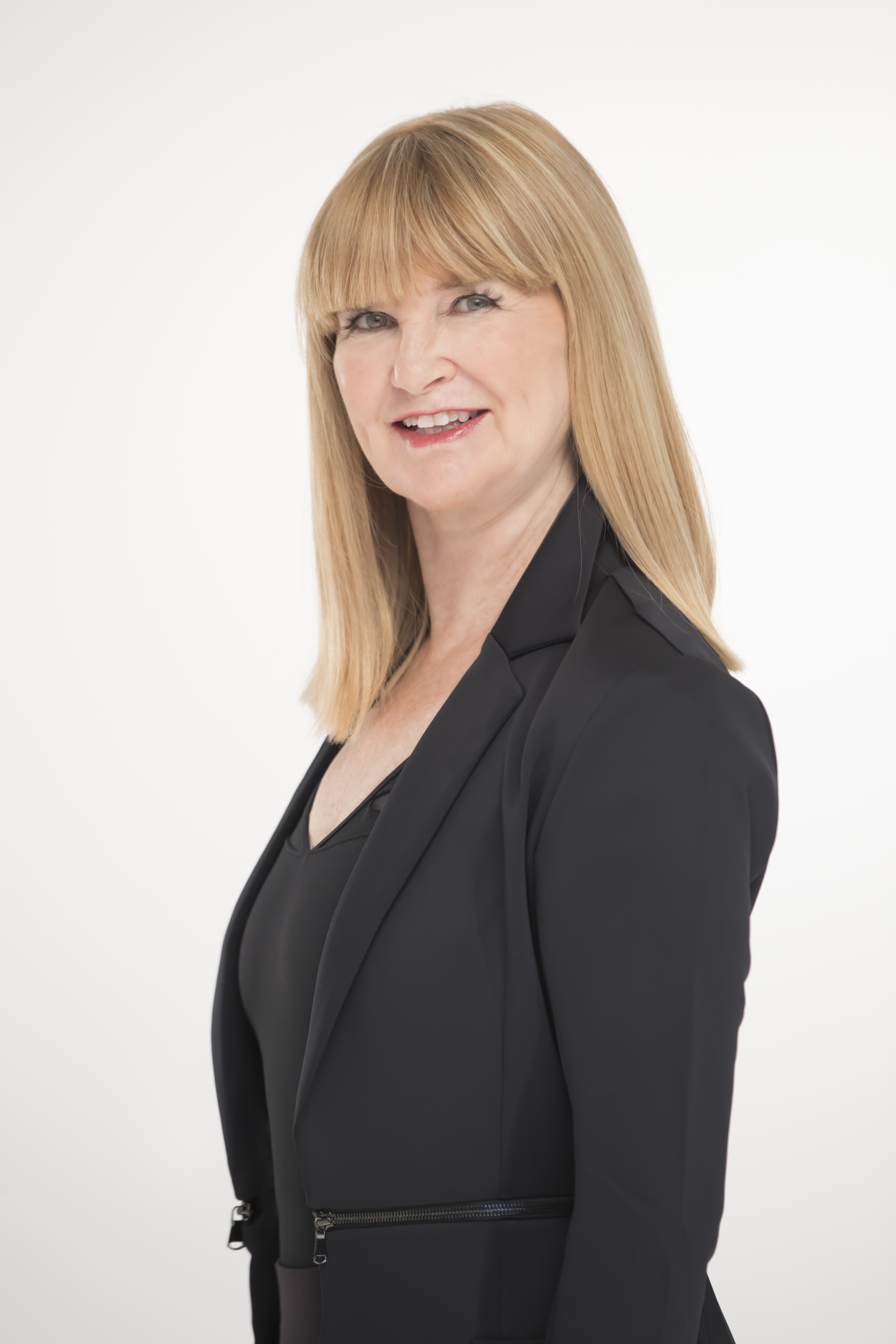
- Esmonde-White in 2016
- Born: May 9, 1949 (age 77); Edmonton, Alberta, Canada
- Occupations: Author, anti-aging educator, ballerina
- Children: Sahra Esmonde-White (daughter)
- Writing career
- Genre: Self-help
- Subject: exercise
- Notable work: Aging Backwards
- Website: www.essentrics.com

Miranda Esmonde-White (born May 9, 1949) is a Canadian fitness trainer, former ballerina with the National Ballet of Canada, and author of books on aging, health and fitness. She created the dynamic stretching and strengthening workout, Essentrics, and the PBS fitness TV show, Classical Stretch, based on Essentrics.

Her study of the benefits of eccentric stretch training has also been the basis of the pledge documentaries Aging Backwards and Forever Painless airing on PBS public television.

== Early life and family ==
A self-described army brat born in Edmonton to Lt.-Col. Laurence Esmonde-White, she moved with her family to Calgary, and eventually to Montreal. Her mother, Anstace Esmonde-White, and father Larry were the hosts of From A Country Garden, a public television series produced by WPBS-TV that ran on PBS for seventeen years beginning in 1986. Her daughter, Sahra Esmonde-White, took over her grandparents' gardens and added an apothecary. Producer of many of her mother's television shows, Sahra is a co-owner of EWH Productions and hosts the Essentrics Workout Series.

== Ballet ==
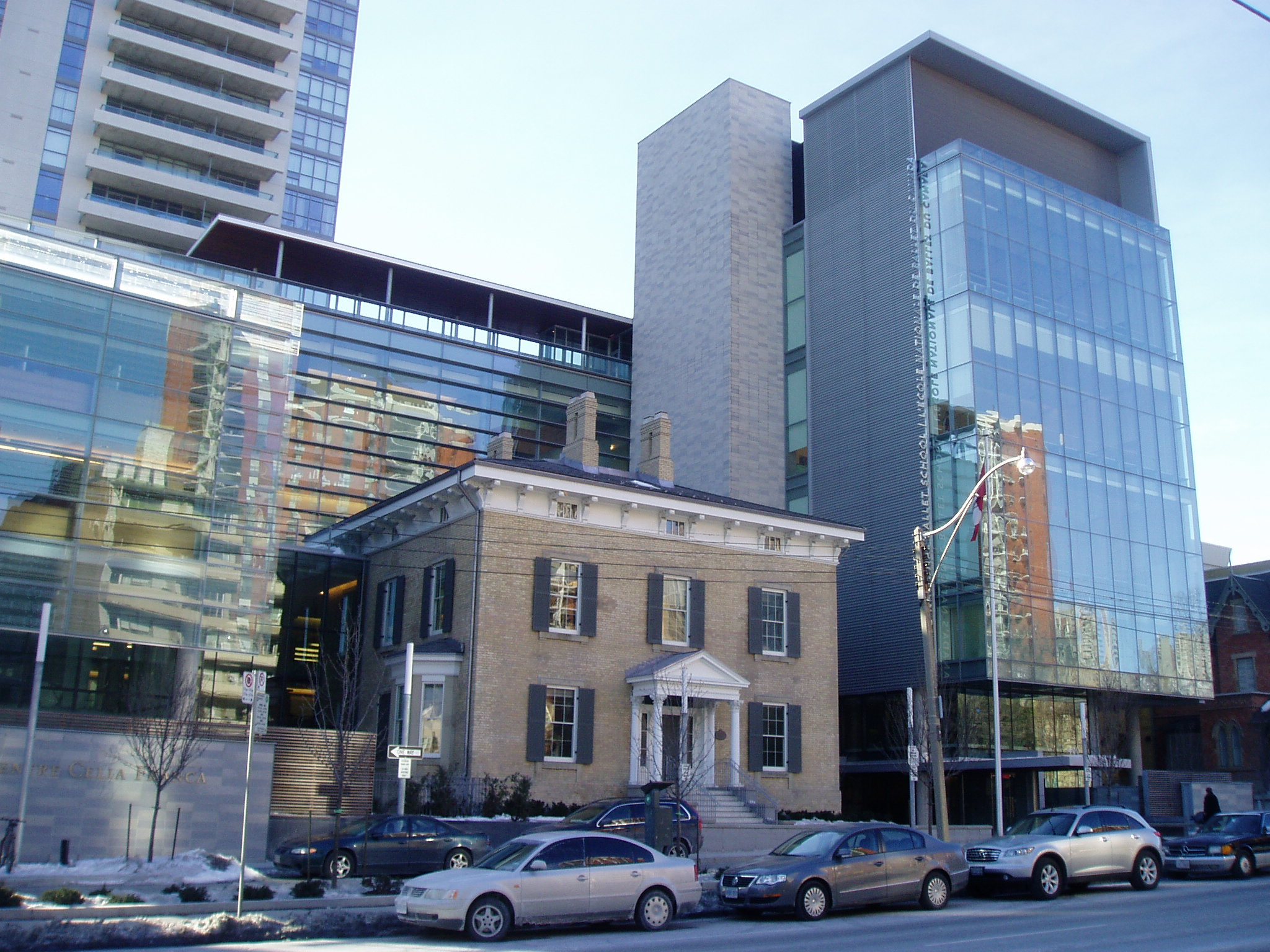
Canada's National Ballet School

Esmonde-White began her career studying to become a ballerina at Canada's National Ballet School co-founded in 1959 by Celia Franca and Betty Oliphant in Toronto, Ontario. A photo in Dance Collection Danse shows her classmates and a young Esmonde-White smiling up at the violinist Yehudi Menuhin after his concert at Massey Hall. After her training, she worked around the world with the National Ballet of Canada at the same time that the company danced with Margot Fonteyn, Rudolf Nureyev, and other very well-known dancers such as Karen Kain and Robert Joffrey. Unfortunately, she broke a foot, and the injury ended her ballet career in her early twenties.

== Montreal studio ==
Esmonde-White's next effort, her own company making homemade rag dolls, led to her becoming an executive at the toymaker Hasbro, but business trips kept her away from her child, who was then five years old. Separating from the corporate world and searching for the means to support herself, she started to teach fitness classes in a nearby church and soon had almost five classes per day. She opened a dance and fitness studio in Montreal, where she became a flexibility trainer and developed her own technique. Esmonde-White claims she was able to alleviate her persistent back pain using her own exercise program. As her classes became popular, she then had to train more teachers. She spent much of the next ten years researching and perfecting instructor training manuals.

== Classical Stretch ==
Esmonde-White combined her own movements and elements of ballet, tai chi, and physiotherapy. Classical Stretch was designed to relieve pain, increase athletes' speed, and lengthen the muscles of the full body. The technique is continuous movement, usually standing. Barre work can be done using a chair or counter top. Floor work requires a yoga mat and optionally a resistance band and/or a yoga block. Esmonde-White's technique includes no weight-bearing exercises that can stress the wrist like yoga. Her movements are easy to do, unlike Pilates where people try for technically correct moves. She realized that her technique emphasized essentric movement, something that was known to sports medicine but had been sometimes considered wasted effort. It took a while for the idea of strengthening the muscular system by lengthening muscles to catch on in fitness circles, but eventually she prevailed, asking her students to exercise for about 22 minutes every day.

She approached PBS with a series idea in 1999, and her technique has been a successful television program ever since. Classical Stretch is presented on more than one hundred stations across the U.S., and has more than three hundred episodes as of 2014. The program reaches approximately 60 percent of the U.S. market.

The product of three iterations, Esmonde-White completed her textbook as manuals in levels one to four, Classical Stretch: The Esmonde Technique. She also hosts a suite of Classical Stretch DVDs.

== Essentrics ==
The television audience for Classical Stretch began as mainly women in their 40s and 50s, so Esmonde-White sought to expand her audience to younger viewers. Also Classical Stretch user-friendly movements turned off young males who like to tell themselves they are doing hard work in the gym. Until they try it, many young men think a stretch class would be too easy for them. Essentrics was developed with her daughter Sahra for younger audiences. They developed a teacher-training system which includes printed manuals and DVDs, and is available for distance education. Essentrics is presented for all ages and genders, and seeks to strengthen and stretch every one of the body's 620 muscles.

== Breast cancer rehabilitation ==
Six weeks before taping of the first fifteen Classical Stretch PBS shows was scheduled to start, Esmonde-White found a lump in a breast and was diagnosed with breast cancer. After surgery, the cancer was contained and she required radiation but not chemotherapy, saving her from hair loss. She could not raise her arm above her waist and had underarm pain. She found that talking with other cancer survivors helped her spirits. Her daughter Sahra designed and found funding and crews to make a workout video with Esmonde-White that has been seen in many countries including Canada, Costa Rica, Guatemala, Mexico, Panama, Greece, India, South Africa, and the United States. Designed for people who have been treated for breast cancer, the workout can increase the range of motion of the arms and shoulders after a mastectomy and prevents lymphedema. Esmonde-White recovered in time for taping. Together, the Esmonde-Whites gave workshops and lectures to help others understand rehabilitation.

== Work with athletes and celebrities ==
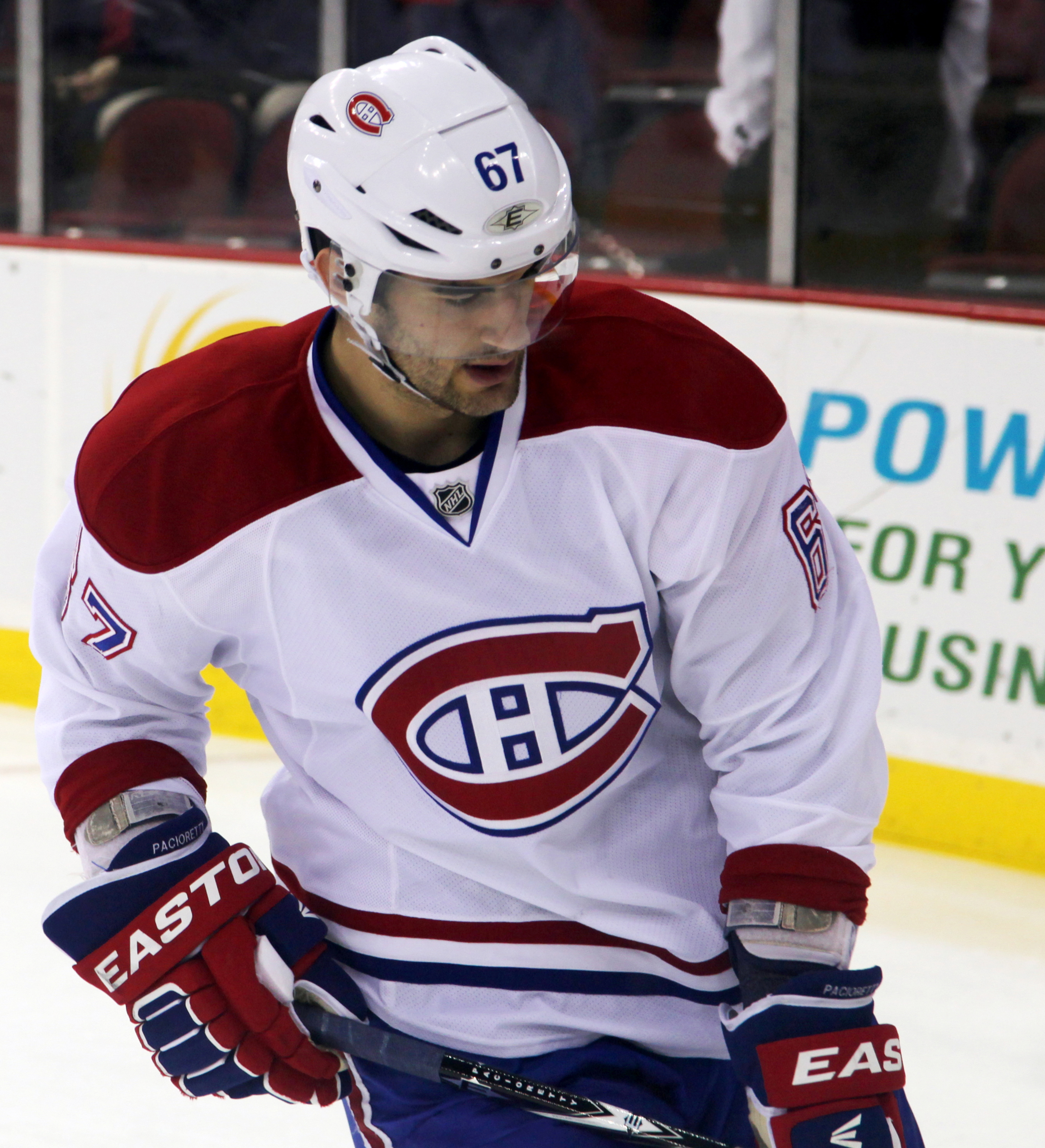
"After they felt how good you feel after it, it got pretty serious," said Canadiens team captain Max Pacioretty.

Esmonde-White and daughter Sahra have attracted students to the Essentrics studio in downtown Montreal, where they are in demand as bio‐mechanics and stretching trainers. The longest-running professional ice hockey team in the world, the Montreal Canadiens, are followers as are students from the school of Cirque du Soleil. Sahra holds Essentrics sessions once or twice a week for the Canadiens during training camp at the suggestion of Pierre Allard, their strength and conditioning coach. Other fans include actresses Naomie Harris and Sarah Gadon, and model Lily Cole.

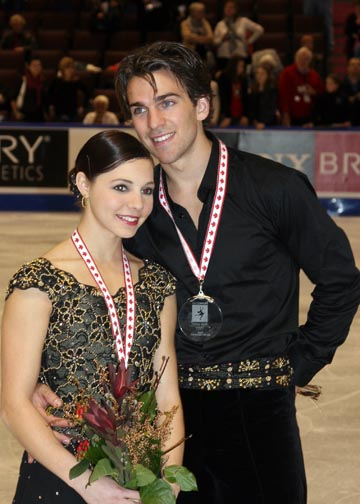
Jessica Dubé and Bryce Davison in 2008

Esmonde-White has worked with a number of prominent Canadian athletes: Sports Hall of Fame diver Alexandre Despatie, synchronized divers Meaghan Benfeito and Roseline Filion, Olympic gold-medal goalie Kim St-Pierre, squash player Jonathon Power, figure skater Joannie Rochette, and pairs champions Jessica Dubé and Bryce Davison. Prima ballerina Anik Bissonnette came to work with Esmonde-White for two weeks, and returned to dancing without her chronic hip pain.

The Essentrics studio website has a list of athletes and organizations that are students.

== Publications ==
=== Aging Backwards ===
Esmonde-White's first book, Aging Backwards: Reverse the Aging Process and Look 10 Years Younger in 30 Minutes a Day, explains Esmonde-White's method to balance the body's strength and flexibility. First released in 2014, and updated in 2018, the book became a New York Times bestseller. Esmonde-White explains two types of exercise. Concentric exercise "crunches" muscles, while eccentric exercise (her Essentrics) "stretches and lengthens" muscles. The latter exercise thus counteracts the "stiffening, shrinking aspects of aging".

=== Forever Painless ===
Released in 2016, Esmonde-White's second book, Forever Painless, offers her own approach to pain management, and is a guide to ending chronic pain for good through movement.

=== Books ===
- Esmonde-White, Miranda (2016). Forever Painless. Harper Wave. ISBN 978-0062448668.
- Esmonde-White, Miranda (2018) [2014]. Aging Backwards (updated ed.). Harper Wave. ISBN 978-0062859327.
- Classical Stretch: The Esmonde Technique, by Miranda Esmonde-White; George Demirakos, Contributing Editor, Pearson Learning Solutions, August 28, 2006, 285 pages, ISBN 9780536277350.
- Essentrics Teacher Training Course (4 Levels) – 2009
- Classical Stretch Text Book and Study Manual (published by Pearson Publishing) – 2006

=== DVDs ===
- "Classical Stretch - The Esmonde Technique: Full Body Workout," Vol. 1 and subsequent series through 2014. ASIN: B00K1MPGBK, by Miranda Esmonde-White, August 12, 2003

== See also ==
- Eccentric training

== Bibliography ==
- Esmonde-White, Miranda (2018) [2014]. Aging Backwards (updated ed.). Harper Wave. ISBN 978-0062859327.
