= Neuroscience Research Australia =

Medical research institute in Australia

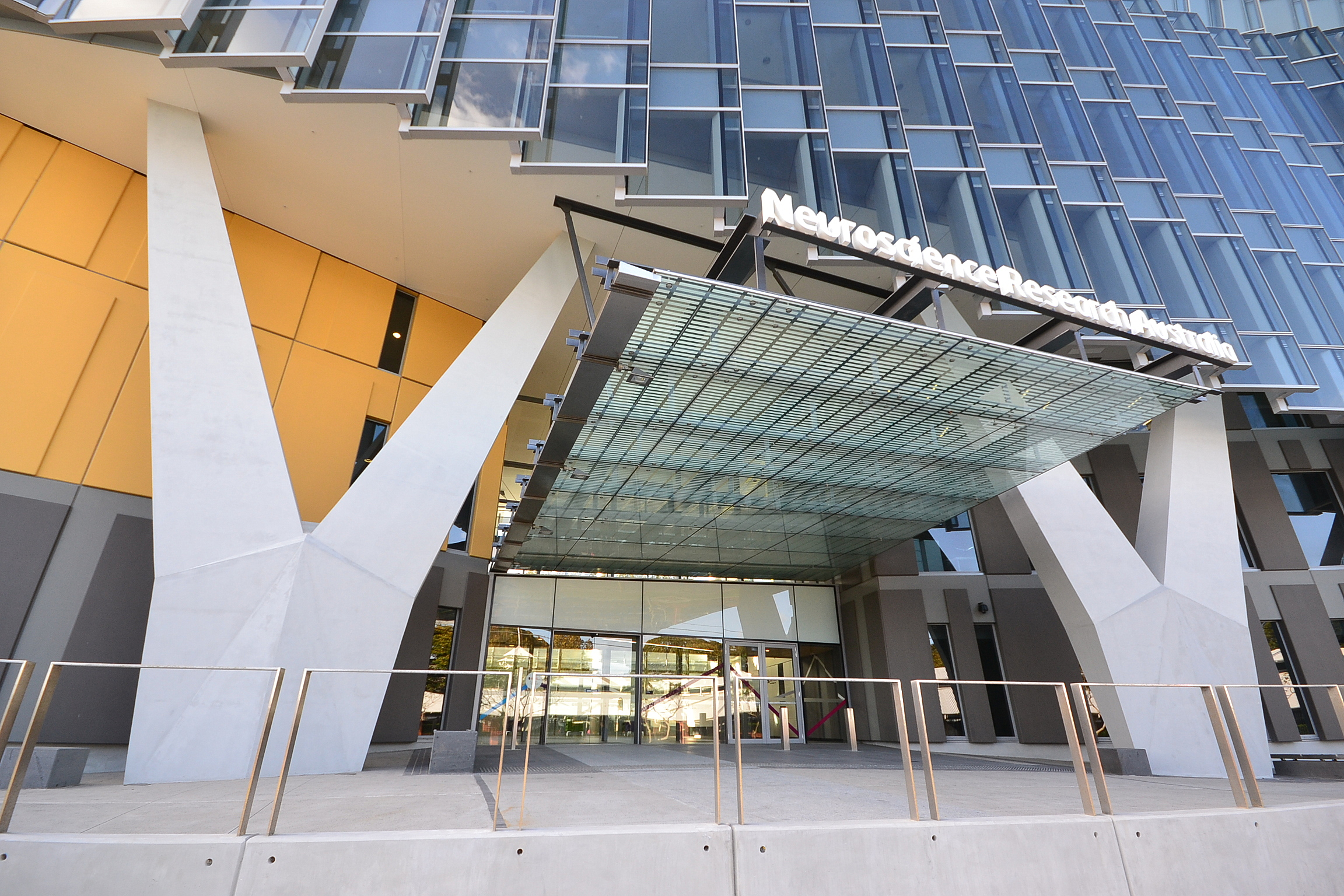
- Nickname: NeuRA
- Established: 1991
- Research type: Medical research
- Director: Professor Matthew Kiernan AM
- Faculty: 400+
- Location: Sydney, New South Wales
- Campus: Randwick
- Affiliations: University of New South Wales, Black Dog Institute, South Eastern Sydney Local Health District (SESLHD), Mindgardens Network.
- Website: neura.edu.au

Neuroscience Research Australia (or NeuRA) is an independent, not-for-profit medical research institute based in Sydney, New South Wales. The institute is made up of over 400 researchers specialising in research to improve the lives of people living with brain and nervous system disorders. The institute's research spans neurodegeneration, including dementia and Parkinson's disease; mental health and mental illness including bipolar disorder and schizophrenia; and translational neuroscience including falls prevention, pain and injury prevention.

== History ==
NeuRA was established in 1991 as the Prince of Wales Medical Research Institute, by Professors Ian McCloskey, David Burke, Simon Gandevia and Erica Potter, with the support of the Eastern Sydney Area Health Service (now South Eastern Sydney and Illawarra Area Health Service) and the University of New South Wales. In 1993 the Institute was established as an independent, not-for-profit company and researchers moved into buildings on the site of the old Randwick Chest Hospital, next to the Prince of Wales Hospital in Randwick. It was officially opened on 8 November 1993 by the Commonwealth Minister for Health Graham Richardson and the NSW Minister for Health Ron Phillips.

On 15 November 2000, the Premier of New South Wales, Bob Carr, officially opened the new sections of the institute. In June 2009 the Minister for Science and Medical Research Jodi McKay opened the Prince Henry Wing extension.

In May 2007, the NSW government gave planning approval to the concept and project plans for a Neuroscience Research Precinct to be built on the existing site. Building works began on the first phase of the project in March 2010; with the first stage of 13,000 square metres (140,000 sq ft) designed by COX Architecture completed in 2013 at a cost of A$40 million. The completed building provides six stories of laboratory and clinical research space, 25,000 square metres (270,000 sq ft) of floor space and the ability to house up to 700 researchers. The institute relaunched as Neuroscience Research Australia (NeuRA) on 1 June 2010.

In 2018, NeuRA formed a cooperative partnership of four clinical, educational and research allies, including Black Dog Institute, South Eastern Sydney Local Health District (SESLHD) and UNSW Sydney to create Mindgardens Neuroscience Network which became the largest collaboration between researchers and clinicians in the Southern Hemisphere on brain disorders.

In 2024, NeuRA helped found the National Parkinson's Alliance, to raise funding for Parkinson's research in Australia.

== Research ==
NeuRA regularly receives funding for projects from the National Health and Medical Research Council, Australian Research Council and Medical Research Future Fund, as well as private philanthropy.

NeuRA's research activity is organised into three themes:

- Neurodegeneration: Ageing in indigenous and general populations, Alzheimer's disease, frontotemporal dementia and other types of dementia, mitochondrial disease, motor neuron disease, NeuroHIV and Parkinson's disease;
- Mental health: Wellbeing and resilience, bipolar disorder, depression, schizophrenia, and stress-related psychopathology;
- Translational neuroscience: Back and muscle pain, balance training, sleep apnoea, injury prevention, chronic pain, falls prevention, hip fracture care and recovery, spinal cord injury, neural injury, phantom limb pain, sensation, stroke and vestibular balance.

NeuRA houses the following research centers:

- a brain mapping facility, run by a team of researchers who produce atlases of the human brain. Atlases produced by NeuRA researchers such as George Paxinos are used internationally as guides for scientific work.
- The Sydney Brain Bank, a specialised biobanking facility that collects and organizes human brain and spinal cord tissue for research into ageing and neurodegenerative disorders.
- The NeuRA Imaging facility, an open-access 3T MRI research facility.
- The Transurban Road Safety Centre, a crash lab studying road safety, built 2017 through a partnership with Transurban.
- Spinal Cord Injury Research Centre
- Centre for Pain IMPACT
- An imaging facility

NeuRA also runs the Australian and New Zealand Hip Fracture Registry which works to improve care outcomes. It was established by the Professor Jacqui Close and Professor Ian Harris in 2012.

=== Notable work ===
Professor Peter Schofield AO and Dr Bill Brooks are founding members of the Dominantly Inherited Alzheimer Network (DIAN) study – a significant collaborative effort studying familial Alzheimer's disease through sites in the US, Australia, England and Germany. In 2012, DIAN researchers showed the onset of symptoms in Alzheimer's disease is preceded by the accumulation of amyloid (abnormal protein) in the brain over a period of 15 to 20 years. This study paved the way for using biomarkers as surrogate end points in clinical trials.

In 2013, National Child Restraint Guidelines developed by Professor Lynne Bilston and Associate Professor Julie Brown were adopted by the Australian government and this resulted in a reduction of child fatalities in motor vehicles by 45%.

In 2017, Associate Professor Ingvars Birznieks discovered the neural code used to signal touch sensation.

In November 2018, NeuRA's team of neuroscientists led by George Paxinos reported a finding of a new region of the human brain which they called the endorestiform nucleus. The group adopted an innovative enhanced staining method.

In 2018, Professor Cyndi Shannon Weickert discovered immune cells in brains of many people with schizophrenia opening new avenues for treatment.

Also in 2018, NeuRA formed a partnership of four clinical, educational and research groups, including Black Dog Institute, South Eastern Sydney Local Health District (SESLHD), and UNSW Sydney, to create Mindgardens Neuroscience Network. It became the largest collaboration between researchers and clinicians on brain disorders in the Southern Hemisphere.

In 2019, Professor Kaarin Anstey and Associate Professor Ruth Peters contribute to World Health Organisation guidelines on risk reduction of cognitive decline and dementia. The guidelines were designed as a tool to provide evidence-based recommendations on relevant lifestyle behaviours and interventions to health care providers, governments and policy makers.

Also in 2019, the Sydney Brain Bank, based in NeuRA, launched a donor program in collaboration with the University of Newcastle, aimed at investigating the long-term effects of head injuries on former National Rugby League (NRL) players. This initiative invited retired NRL players to contribute to research by donating their brains to the Sydney Brain Bank after their passing. Under the direction of Sydney Brain Bank Director Claire Shepherd, researchers examined the donated brains for cellular changes indicative of conditions like chronic traumatic encephalopathy (CTE).

In 2021, Associate Professors Jan Fullerton and Tom Weickert and Professors Peter Schofield AO, Melissa Green and Professor Cyndi Shannon Weickert were involved in the world's largest bipolar genetics study, consisting of consisting of 200 institutions and over 415,000 research participants. The study identified 64 genomic regions that make people more susceptible to bipolar disorder – more than doubling the number of regions previously identified – and pinpointed the specific genes and pathways impacted. The study also revealed DNA sequence differences in specific genes that are involved in the therapeutic action of antipsychotics and a range of other medicines, which could lead to the development of more targeted medications, or the repurposing of existing medications as potential treatments.

Also in 2021, Neura researchers launched the eWALK trial, using neurostimulation to restore spinal nerve function.

In 2023, after a decade-long collaboration between NeuRA professor Carolyn Sue and other mitochondrial research professionals, Australia's Department of Health and Aged Care's Medical Services Advisory Committee (MSAC) agreed to publicly fund genetic testing for mitochondrial diseases.

Also in 2023, NeuRA's Carolyn Sue tested a new form of gene therapy aimed at slowing or stopping the progression of Parkinson's disease. She tested the hypothesis that the Nix protein can rejuvenate mitophagy and mitochondrial function in individuals affected by Parkinson's.

== Operations ==
NeuRA is located in the purpose-built Margarete Ainsworth Building on Barker Street in Randwick, Sydney, the first stage of the neuroscience research precinct in Randwick. The Neuroscience Research Precinct links together the research of NeuRA, the University of New South Wales, the Black Dog Institute, the National Drug and Alcohol Research Centre and the Prince of Wales campus hospitals.

== See also ==
- Health in Australia
