= Brenda Bigland-Ritchie =

- Education: University College London
- Known for: Energy cost of muscle contraction, Motor units and Neuromuscular fatigue, Spinal reflex mechanisms during fatigue
- Scientific career
- Fields: Skeletal Muscle Physiology
- Workplaces: University College of London, Hunter College, Marymount Manhattan College, Quinniapiac College, Yale University School of Medicine, University of Miami Miller School of Medicine

Brenda Bigland-Ritchie (23 September 1927 – 25 March 2019) was an English physiologist and biomechanist in the field of skeletal muscle physiology.

== Background ==
Bigland-Ritchie completed an undergraduate degree in Physiology at University College London in 1949, and further received a PhD from there in 1969. Bigland-Ritchie also received a Doctorate in Science from the same university in 1987.

Following her completion of her undergraduate degree in 1949, Bigland-Ritchie began work as a research fellow in the Physiology Department at University College London. Upon direction from Archibald Hill, she conducted research examining the metabolic cost of muscle contraction. This research gained her the attention of the Royal Society, and began to build her profile in the field of physiology.

Bigland RItchie was married to Joseph Murdoch Ritchie, a biophysicist. Bigland-Ritchie took a break from research following the birth of her first child in 1953, but returned to teaching at Hunter College and Marymount Manhattan College in New York. Following the completion of her PhD, Bigland-Ritchie began work and obtained tenure at Quinniapiac College (now University). She later joined the Department of Paediatrics at Yale University School of Medicine, before finishing her career working at The Miami Project to Cure Paralysis at the University of Miami Miller School of Medicine.

Bigland-Ritchie's contributions to the fields of physiology and biomechanics have been described as "seminal" by other prominent researchers in these fields such as Roger Enoka and Simon Gandevia. Her research into the energy cost of muscle contraction, motor units and neuromuscular fatigue have been widely cited since their publication, and stimulated further inquiry into spinal reflex mechanisms during fatigue.

In 2003 she was the recipient of the University of College London Fellowship.

Bigland Ritchie died on 25 March 2019.

In 2026, the International Society of Electrophysiology and Kinesiology will award the inaugural Brenda Bigland Ritchie Award to recognize outstanding mid-career researchers in the field of electrophysiology and/or kinesiology.
