= Cyndi Shannon Weickert =

American psychiatrist

- Born: Finger Lakes
- Education: National Institute of Mental Health; Icahn School of Medicine at Mount Sinai; Keuka College
- Scientific career
- Workplaces: University of New South Wales

Cyndi Shannon Weickert is an American professor and researcher. Her research investigates the molecular developmental neurobiology of schizophrenia.

== Early life and education ==
Weickert is from Finger Lakes. She studied biology and psychology at Keuka College in upstate New York. She completed her doctorate in Biomedical Science at the Icahn School of Medicine at Mount Sinai. She moved to the National Institute of Mental Health as a postdoctoral scholar, where she was eventually promoted to Unit Chief of Molecules in the Neurobiology Unit.

== Research and career ==
Weickert studies the neurobiological mechanisms that underpin psychiatric disease. She investigates the cellular and molecular-level changes that take place in the brains of people suffering from schizophrenia. In 2010, she moved to Neuroscience Research Australia, where she leads the translational research team. She was appointed to the Board of the Schizophrenia International Research Society in 2012.

Weickert looks to understand the relationship between brain inflammation and psychiatric disorders, and uses this understanding to develop personalised treatment. She has shown that people with schizophrenia who have more brain inflammation have more complex neuropathologies, including more cortical thinning and poorer cognition.

Weickert has contributed extensively to the understanding of schizophrenia. She has uncovered the impact of neurodevelopment on schizophrenia, in particular the role of blunted neuroplasticity, and disturbances in the brain-derived neurotrophic factor and estrogen receptor. Her work revealed that postnatal recruitment of cortical inhibitory neurons is abnormal in people with schizophrenia.

Weickert was awarded the 2016 Biological Psychiatry Australia Isaac Schweitzer Award. In 2021, she was awarded the Schizophrenia International Research Society Outstanding Translational Research Awardee.

== Personal life ==
Weickert had a twin brother who was diagnosed with schizophrenia at the age of 17. He struggled to find effective treatment, and died from a cardiometabolic disease related to the schizophrenia in his early forties.

== Selected publications ==
- Eli A. Stahl; Gerome Breen; Andreas J Forstner; et al. (1 May 2019). "Genome-wide association study identifies 30 loci associated with bipolar disorder". Nature Genetics. 51 (5): 793–803. doi:10.1038/s41588-019-0397-8. ISSN 1061-4036. PMC 6956732. PMID 31043756. Wikidata Q63433064.
- Niamh Mullins; Andreas J Forstner; Kevin S O'Connell; et al. (June 2021). "Genome-wide association study of more than 40,000 bipolar disorder cases provides new insights into the underlying biology". Nature Genetics. 53 (6): 817–829. doi:10.1038/s41588-021-00857-4. ISSN 1061-4036. PMC 8192451. PMID 34002096. Wikidata Q115209637.
- Theo G M van Erp; Esther Walton; Derrek P Hibar; et al. (14 May 2018). "Cortical Brain Abnormalities in 4474 Individuals With Schizophrenia and 5098 Control Subjects via the Enhancing Neuro Imaging Genetics Through Meta Analysis (ENIGMA) Consortium". Biological Psychiatry. 84 (9): 644–654. doi:10.1016/j.biopsych.2018.04.023. ISSN 0006-3223. PMC 6177304. PMID 29960671. Wikidata Q55983721.
