= Man Therapy =

American mental health campaign

Man Therapy is an interactive mental health campaign targeting working age men (25-54) that employs humor to cut through stigma and tackle issues like depression, divorce and anxiety. The campaign features the fictional Dr. Rich Mahogany, described by Adam Newman in the New York Times as "an affable, mustachioed, middle-aged man whose personality might be described as Dr. Phil meets Ron Burgundy, Will Ferrell's fictional anchorman."

Man Therapy was created by Cactus (cactusinc.com), a Denver-based ad agency, in partnership with the Office of Suicide Prevention at the Colorado Department of Public Health and Environment. Man Therapy is currently operated by Grit Digital Health (gritdigitalhealth.com).

== About the campaign ==
The purpose of the Man Therapy campaign is to provide men approaching crisis, and their loved ones, a place to go and learn more about men's mental health, examine their own and consider a wide array of actions that will put them on the path to treatment and recovery. The message is that all men should be aware of their mental health, treat it like they would a broken leg and strive to get better.

Man Therapy is built around the fictional Man Therapist, Dr. Rich Mahogany. He's a man's man who is dedicated to cutting through the denial with a fresh approach using his odd sense of humor, direct advice to address mental health topics. The character was created to reduce social stigma around mental health disorders and encourage men to seek help.

The centerpiece of the campaign is the ManTherapy.org website, where men and their loved ones will find they have a virtual appointment with Dr. Mahogany. He greets visitors, makes them feel at ease and then provides an overview of what they will find and explore during their visit. From there, visitors can navigate through Dr. Mahogany's office where they can find useful information about men's mental health including guy's guide to Gentlemental Health. Men can also choose to take an 18-question quiz to evaluate their own mental health, access resources and explore a wide range of actions from accessing do-it-yourself tips, seeking therapy referral sources, links to local support groups and organizations as well as a crisis line.

The integrated communications campaign also includes a 30-second TV PSA, viral videos, social media, outdoor boards and outreach materials such as posters, coasters and Dr. Mahogany's business card.

== History ==
In 2006, as a part of their partnership with the Colorado Department of Public Health and Environment, Joe Conrad, Cactus Founder and CEO was introduced to Jarrod Hindman, Director of the Office of Suicide Prevention (OSP). He was running an underfunded program to address the critically important issue of suicide in Colorado. Cactus agreed to do some pro bono work for the program. Through that process the agency learned a great deal about this issue and was introduced to the Carson J Spencer Foundation (CJSF), a local non-profit dedicated to suicide prevention. Together, Cactus, OSP and CJSF formed a partnership to try to reach working aged men who were potentially high risk for suicide and unlikely to seek help on their own.

With a $25,000 contribution from the American Foundation for Suicide Prevention and $5,000 allocated from a larger Garrett Lee Smith Suicide Prevention grant, Cactus developed a comprehensive public education plan while conducting some insightful and cost-effective research studies. Fortunately, the OSP gained access to some untapped state dollars for a one-time, $400,000 campaign. Cactus competed for the contract in a state-bid process and was awarded the contract in 2009. However, a week after the contract was signed, Cactus was informed that, due to state budget cuts, the entire grant and contract was cancelled. Cactus was left with nothing but a plan without a budget to implement it, but the partnership was determined to continue. Serendipitously, Cactus heard that the Anschutz Foundation was looking to invest in a suicide prevention program. Cactus submitted a grant proposal on behalf of a private/public/non-profit partnership between Cactus, OSP at the Colorado Department of Public Health and Environment and the CJSF. Cactus was awarded a grant from the Anschutz Foundation to develop a campaign while establishing a sustainable effort in Colorado and beyond.

== Results ==
Man Therapy is an evidence-based, suicide prevention campaign that is proven to: 1) reduce stigma, 2) increase help-seeking behavior, and 3) reduce suicidal ideation in men. A five-year, $1.2 million clinical study in the state of Michigan found clear evidence that the campaign successfully accomplishes each of these objectives.

The Man Therapy campaign has received numerous awards for its innovative approach to mental health, including the Gold Addy Award for Public Service: Digital Advertising and Advertising Age awarded Man Therapy the Pro Bono Campaign of the Year. In addition, Man Therapy was recognized by the Safe States Alliance as the 2013 Innovative Initiative of the Year.

An Australian version of Man Therapy launched in May 2013 in partnership with Beyond Blue.
