= Beyond Blue =

Australian mental health and wellbeing support organisation

- Formation: 1 January 2000; 26 years ago
- Type: Non-profit
- Registration no.: ABN 87 093 865 840
- Legal status: Charity
- Purpose: To promote and improve mental health, and support those affected by anxiety, depression and suicide.
- Headquarters: Melbourne CBD, Victoria, Australia
- Region served: Australia
- Chair: Linda Dessau
- CEO: Georgie Harman
- Revenue: $73,894,888.00 (2024)
- Expenses: $82,821,750.00 (2024)
- Employees: 209
- Website: beyondblue.org.au
- Formerly called: beyondblue

Beyond Blue is an Australian mental health and wellbeing support organisation. They provide support programs to address issues related to depression, suicide, anxiety disorders and other related mental illnesses.

The organisation works in partnership with governments, local health services, educational institutions, workplaces, media and community organisations, as well as the general community to raise community awareness about anxiety and depression and reduce the associated stigma. Beyond Blue was founded in 2000 by former premier of Victoria, Jeff Kennett. It is currently chaired by Linda Dessau, former Governor of Victoria. Dessau is supported by CEO Georgie Harman.

== History ==
Beyond Blue began in October 2000 as a five-year initiative of the Australian Government, as well as state and territory governments. Assisted by persistent lobbying by Jeff Kennett, the initiative stemmed from public debate on the treatment of people living with depression. The aim was to raise awareness of depression and to reduce the associated stigma. As of 2024, Beyond Blue receives 70% ($52,365,404.00) of its funding from governments.

Politicians have encouraged people to utilise and donate to Beyond Blue, including Geoff Gallop and former chair John Brogden.

Since 2006, the Australian Football League has supported the organisation with the annual Beyond Blue Cup. It is awarded to the winner of clashes between Geelong and Hawthorn football clubs.

In March 2017, it was announced that former prime minister Julia Gillard would take over as chair of Beyond Blue from founder and chair Jeff Kennett. Gillard replaced Kennett on 2 July 2017.

In December 2023, Gillard retired as chair of Beyond Blue and was replaced by Sam Mostyn. Mostyn served in this role until she became Governor-General in 2024. Mostyn was replaced by interim chair Kate Carnell, former chief minister of the Australian Capital Territory.

== Work ==
Beyond Blue addresses a range of mental health issues in Australia, including mental health stigma, indigenous issues, post-natal depression, school-based interventions, and youth mental health.

=== LGBT Australians ===
In 2011, Jeff Kennett remarked publicly that children of gay and lesbian parents have worse mental health outcomes. Amid resulting controversy, Beyond Blue staff and supporters called on the organisation to create specific programs for gay and lesbian Australians. In 2012, Beyond Blue launched a year-long $1.5 million campaign to reduce gay, lesbian and transgender discrimination in Australia. In 2015, the organisation issued a statement supporting same-sex marriage.

In 2018, Beyond Blue rejected a $5,000 donation from wrestler Dave Marshall. Marshall, who is gay, publicly stated the donation was from selling pornographic photos and videos. Beyond Blue subsequently said they would not accept money that came from "gambling, alcohol or pornography" but clarified they would accept the donation if Marshall removed Beyond Blue's name from his platforms to ensure "future consumers of your products are not given the impression their purchase is in any way supporting Beyond Blue". Marshall instead donated the money to a mental health charity, the Black Dog Institute.

== Activism ==
In 2013, Beyond Blue campaigned against the insurance industry's discrimination against people who have experienced anxiety and depression. They also launched a campaign featuring actor Ben Mendelsohn as the character "Anxiety", describing symptoms and how it feels to experience anxiety, and conducted a survey into the mental health of doctors and medical students finding very high rates of anxiety, depression and suicidal thoughts.

A 2015 survey of 1,200 Australians by TNS Australia revealed that one in five Australians still believe that people with anxiety are just "putting it on". In 2016, Beyond Blue launched another campaign on radio and TV to raise awareness of anxiety and its symptoms, with actor Guy Pearce providing the voice over.

Men are a key audience for Beyond Blue and the Man Therapy campaign achieved widespread coverage. The campaign was a "first of its kind" program in Australia and featured a humorous character, "Dr Brian Ironwood", urging men to take action when it comes to their wellbeing. Launched in 2013, it was an international collaboration with the Colorado Office for Suicide Prevention, whose Man Therapy was adapted for an Australian audience. The campaign was programmed to last one year. Ipsos Social Research Institute evaluated the campaign's effectiveness for Beyond Blue and found that 1/3 of men 18 and over recognised the Man Therapy campaign, 280,000 visited the website and 5–15% of men aware of the campaign changed their attitudes to mental health.

Beyond Blue and AOMB also reached agreement to fundraise an initiative to raise awareness of anxiety and depression in Australia by organising several charity events.

Writing in The Canadian Journal of Psychiatry, Rob Whitley criticised Beyond Blue's advertising as blaming men for their mental health issues. For example, the front page of Beyond Blue's website stating "Men are known for bottling things up".

In September 2023, along with other health organisations, Beyond Blue signed an open letter in support of the Voice to Parliament referendum.

== Helpline ==
Beyond Blue provides support for individuals struggling with anxiety and depression through their helpline. The helpline is accessible 24 hours a day, providing immediate support to those in need. The helpline number is 1300 224 636. This service allows individuals to speak with a trained mental health professional who can provide advice and guide callers to appropriate resources.
