= J. Murdoch Ritchie =

British biophysicist (1925–2008)

Joseph Murdoch Ritchie
- Born: June 10, 1925; Aberdeen, Scotland
- Died: July 9, 2008 (aged 83); Hamden, Connecticut
- Spouse: Brenda Bigland-Ritchie
- Children: Alasdair Ritchie; Jocelyn Ritchie

Joseph Murdoch Ritchie (June 10, 1925 – July 9, 2008) was a Scottish born American biophysicist and a professor at Yale University.

== Early life and education ==
Ritchie studied mathematics and physics at the University of Aberdeen, then did his doctorate at University College, London in biophysics in 1952.

== Career ==
He joined the faculty at Yale in pharmacology in 1968, and later served as chairman of the department and as director of the division of biological sciences (1975–1978). He retired in 2003.

He was elected a Fellow of the Royal Society in 1976. According to his nomination citation "Ritchie's early work was concerned with the factors affecting the onset and duration of the active state in striated muscle, and with other aspects of the dynamics of muscular contraction. In 1954 he turned his attention to the properties of mammalian non-myelinated nerve fibres, and since then has made many distinguished contributions to our knowledge not only of some of the physiological functions served by such fibres, but also of the mechanism of conduction in them. In particular, he has been responsible for definitive studies of the mode of action of acetylcholine and local anaesthetics, of the ionic movements during nervous activity, of the temperature changes during the nervous impulse, of oxidative and glucose metabolism, and of the electrogenic sodium extrusion that underlies post-tetanic hyperpolarization. His most recent work on the specific and non-specific binding of tetrodotoxin has provided new information about the density of sodium channels in various types of nerve."

Ritchie is known for asking the Central Intelligence Agency in 1975 to share its supply of saxitoxin (which were used in suicide pills) with scientists for research and his work in neuroscience. He was the co-author of numerous scientific and technical books and articles.

== Personal life ==
He was married to Brenda Bigland–Ritchie, a physiologist and biomechanist. They had a son, Alasdair Ritchie, a biologist, and a daughter, Jocelyn Ritchie, a neuropsychologist.
