= Theodore Hough =

American physiologist (1865 – 1924)

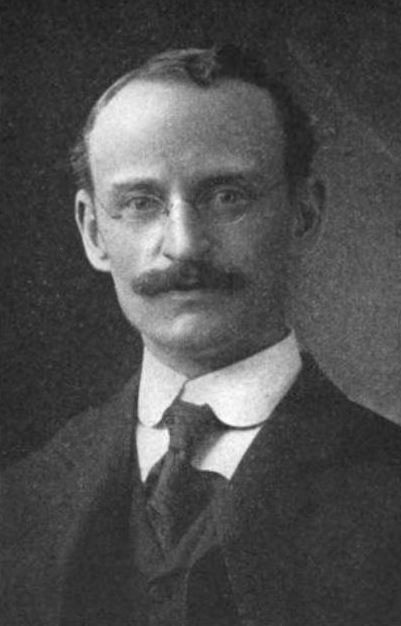
Theodore Hough

Theodore Hough (1865–1924) was an American physician who first described delayed onset muscle soreness (DOMS) in 1902.

== Biography ==
Hough was born in Virginia in 1865. He received his PhD from Johns Hopkins University in 1893. After graduation, he was employed as a professor at MIT where he worked with William T. Sedgwick. In 1907, he became the chair of physiology at the University of Virginia School of Medicine, and became dean in 1916. In 1922, he was president of the Association of American Medical Colleges.

== Selected publications ==
- The Human Mechanism: Its Physiology and Hygiene and the Sanitation of its Surroundings (with William Thompson Sedgwick, 1906)
- Elements of Hygiene and Sanitation (with William Thompson Sedgwick, 1918)
