= Acute muscle soreness =

Muscle pain during exercise

Acute muscle soreness (AMS) is the pain felt in muscles during and immediately, up to 24 hours, after strenuous physical exercise. The pain appears within a minute of contracting the muscle and it will disappear within two or three minutes or up to several hours after relaxing it.

There are two causes of acute muscle soreness:

- Accumulation of chemical end products of exercise in muscle cells such as lactic acid and H^{+}
- Muscle fatigue (the muscle tires and cannot contract anymore)

== Cause ==
Muscle soreness can stem from strain on the sarcomere, the muscle's functional unit, due to the mechanism of activation of the unit by the nerves, which accumulates calcium that further degrades sarcomeres. This degradation initiates the body inflammatory response, and has to be supported by surrounding connective tissues. The inflammatory cells and cytokines stimulate the pain receptors that cause the acute pain associated with AMS. Repair of the sarcomere and the surrounding connective tissue leads to delayed onset muscle soreness, which peaks between 24 and 72 hours after exercise.

AMS may also be caused by cramping following strenuous exercise, which has been theorized to be caused by two pathways:

- Dehydration
- Electrolyte imbalance

=== Dehydration ===
The dehydration theory states that extracellular fluid (ECF) compartment becomes contracted due to the excessive sweating, causing the volume to decrease to the point until the muscles are contracted until the fluids can re-inhabit the vacuum. Excessive sweating can also cause the electrolyte imbalance theory, which is sweating disturbs the body's balance of electrolyte, which results in exciting motor neurons and spontaneous discharge.

The feeling of soreness can also be attributed to the lack of contraction from the muscle, which can lead to overexertion of the muscle. The decrease in contraction has been theorized to have been caused by the high level of concentrations of proton created by glycolysis. Excess in protons displaces calcium ions which is used within the fibers in activating the sarcomere, resulting in a reduced contractile force.

=== Electrolyte imbalance ===
When exercising, lactic acid becomes lactate and H+ through glycolysis. With more lactic acid consumed during the process, there will be a higher H+ concentration, thus lowering the blood’s pH level. This low pH level will affect the energy production process through the inhibition of phosphofructokinase. Phosphofructokinase is a key enzyme in the glycolytic process, which produces energy. A higher concentration of H+ will also cause the loss of contractile force through the misplacement of calcium in muscle fiber, which will disturb the formation of the actin-myosin cross-bridge.

== Treatments ==
There is conflicting research in terms of treatments of muscle soreness.

=== Stretching and muscle soreness ===
Stretching immediately before or after a workout does provide some help, but is not significant enough to be considered as a preventative measure.
