= Helen Christensen =

Australian mental health researcher

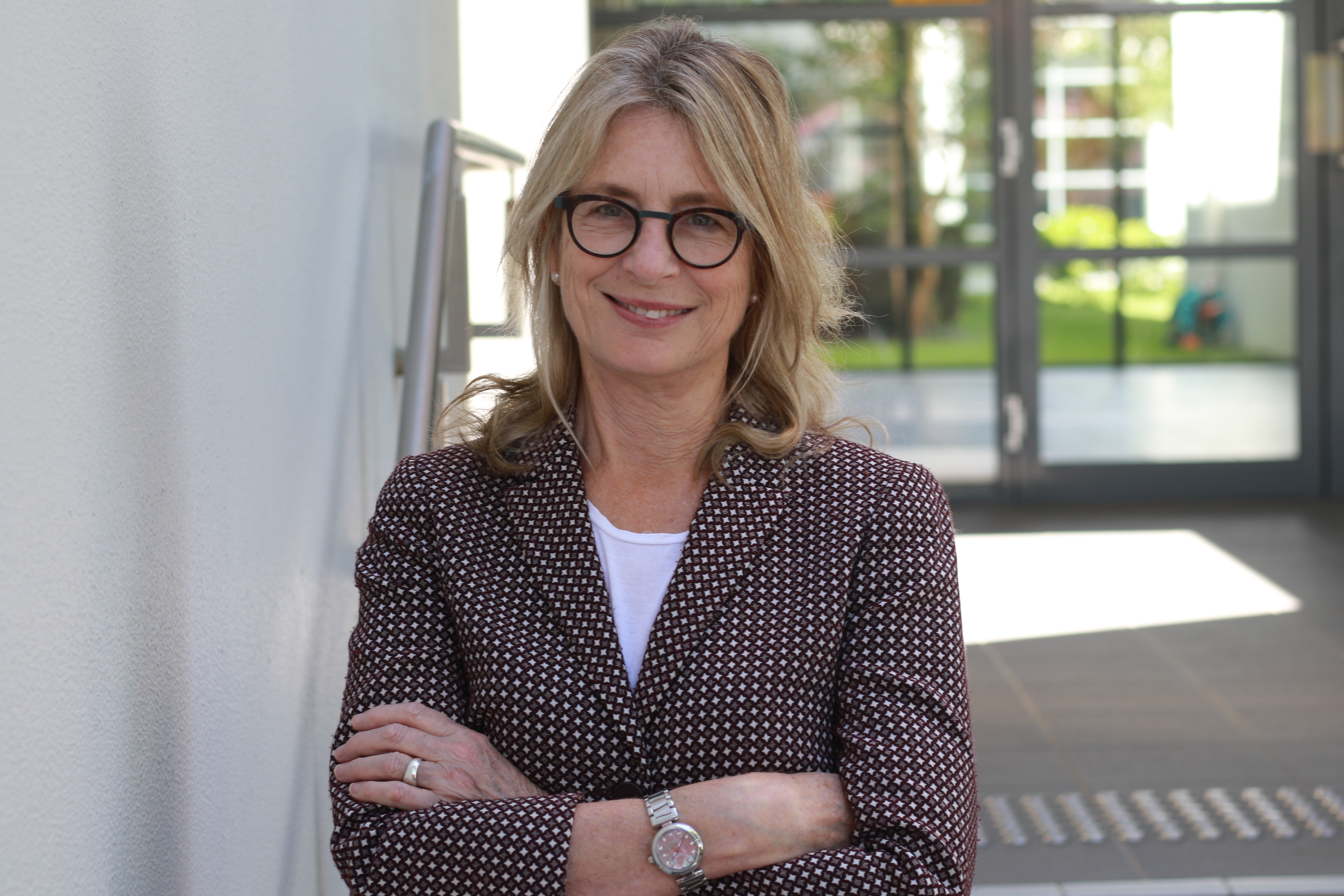
- Born: Hay, New South Wales
- Citizenship: Australia
- Employer: Black Dog Institute
- Awards: Officer of the Order of Australia, James Cook Medal

Helen Christensen AO is a Scientia Professor at the University of New South Wales in Sydney. She is a former executive director and Chief Scientist at the Black Dog Institute, having led the organisation from 2011 to 2021. She continued as Board Director of the Black Dog Institute until 2024.

Christensen was born in Hay, New South Wales, one of seven siblings.

Christensen is a leading expert on using technology to deliver evidence-based interventions for the prevention and treatment of depression, anxiety, suicide, and self-harm. Her research also encompasses prevention of mental health problems in young people through school-based research programs. These programs are aimed at the prevention of depression and suicide risk through eMental Health interventions.

Christensen holds a number of affiliations, including serving on the Million Minds Mission Advisory Panel, an Australian government initiative which supports and funds research into mental health and suicide prevention. She is a Fellow of the Academy of the Social Sciences in Australia, a Fellow of the Australian Academy of Health and Medical Sciences, and a Fellow of the Australian Academy of Science.

Christensen was made an Officer of the Order of Australia (AO) in the 2019 Australia Day Honours for "distinguished service to medical research through the development of on-line mental health treatment programs".

In December 2023, she was awarded the James Cook Medal by the Royal Society of New South Wales for "outstanding contributions to science and human welfare in the Southern Hemisphere".

In 2024, she was made NSW Scientist of the Year, through the Premier's Prizes for Science and Engineering.
