= Willem Kuyken =

British scientist

Willem Kuyken (born 6 May 1968) is a British clinical psychologist and scientist. He is the Ritblat Professor of Mindfulness and Psychological Science at the University of Oxford and Director of the University of Oxford Mindfulness and Psychological Science Research Centre. His research focuses on the prevention and treatment of depression and the development, evaluation, and implementation of cognitive-behavioural and mindfulness-based interventions.

== Early life and education ==
Kuyken was born in Neath, Wales on the 6th May 1968, the youngest of three children, to Dutch parents. His father was raised in Indonesia, and worked as an engineer. His mother was raised in Venlo in the South of Holland, and was a nurse. He spent his childhood until age 9 in Nigeria before moving to the UK.

Kuyken was educated at Winchester College, University College London (BSc Psychology, 1989) and the Institute of Psychiatry, Psychology and Neuroscience, King's College London (PhD, 1992), before training as a clinical psychologist at the Salomons Clinical Psychology Training Centre (Doctorate in Clinical Psychology, 1997).

== Career and contributions ==
Kuyken's research focusses on depression, particularly its prevention, recurrence and long-term course, and the development and evaluation of psychological interventions. His work integrates clinical psychology, cognitive-behavioural therapy, and mindfulness-based approaches, drawing on both psychological science and contemplative traditions.

A central theme of Kuyken’s work is the challenge of implementation: how evidence-based interventions for depression and mental health can be delivered at scale and made accessible across populations and settings, including schools, healthcare systems, and communities.

Before taking up his post in Oxford in 2014, Kuyken was Professor of Clinical Psychology at the University of Exeter. There he led a clinical research group (2001–2010), co-founded (with Ed Watkins) the Wellcome Mood Disorders Centre (2004) and established (with Alison Evans) the Masters in Mindfulness-based Cognitive Therapies (2008) and Mindfulness Network (2012). He also directed the clinical psychology training programme (2001–2004).

He worked in two Postdoctoral Fellowships: a research fellowship at the World Health Organization project managing the development of the World Health Organization Quality of Life Assessment (WHOQOL; 1992–1994) and a clinical research fellowship at the University of Pennsylvania/Beck Institute working with Aaron T. Beck (1998–1999).

He was the recipient of the British Psychological Society May Davidson award in 2006. He was a faculty member of the 2014 Mind and Life Summer Research Science Institute and a grandfathered Diplomate and Fellow of the Academy of Cognitive Therapy.

At the University of Oxford Kuyken has led and co-led major research programmes, including the MYRIAD project (with Mark Williams, Sarah-Jayne Blakemore and Tim Dalgleish) a programme of research on mindfulness in education (2014–2022). He is Principal Investigator of the University of Oxford Mindfulness and Psychological Science Research Centre.

== Books and publications ==
Kuyken authored Mindfulness for Life, a trade book on making mindfulness part of everyday life. He is co-author with Christina Feldman of Mindfulness - Ancient Wisdom Meetings Modern Psychology, which examines the integration of contemplative traditions and modern psychology. He also co-authored, with Christine Padesky and Rob Dudley, Collaborative Case Conceptualisation, a clinical guide to cognitive-behavioural case formulation." With John Orley he published an edited book Quality of Life Assessment: International Perspectives. Kuyken's work includes over 150 peer-reviewed publications,

He has published more than 150 peer-reviewed articles and was listed among the top 1% most cited researchers globally by Clarivate by Web of Science from 2019 to 2025. His research includes randomised controlled trials, meta-analyses, prospective research, and experimental research evaluating mindfulness-based cognitive therapy (MBCT) for preventing relapse and promoting well-being, published in Lancet, the British Medical Journal, and JAMA Psychiatry.

== Public Engagement ==
Kuyken has engaged in public communication of psychological science through lectures, workshops and contributions to policy and healthcare discussions internationally. His work has been reported in media outlets including, The Telegraph, The Guardian, and the BBC and in documentaries such as My Year of Living Mindfully and Trust Me I'm a Doctor.

== Personal life ==
Kuyken has two daughters, Zoe Kuyken, a barrister and Ava Kuyken a professional footballer. Kuyken has spoken publicly about his experience of recurrent depression and its influence on his clinical and research work. He has practiced mindfulness meditation since early adulthood and has trained with teachers including Christina Feldman and Jon Kabat-Zinn.
