= Prince of Wales Hospital (Sydney) =

Prince of Wales Hospital, Sydney
- South Eastern Sydney Local Health District
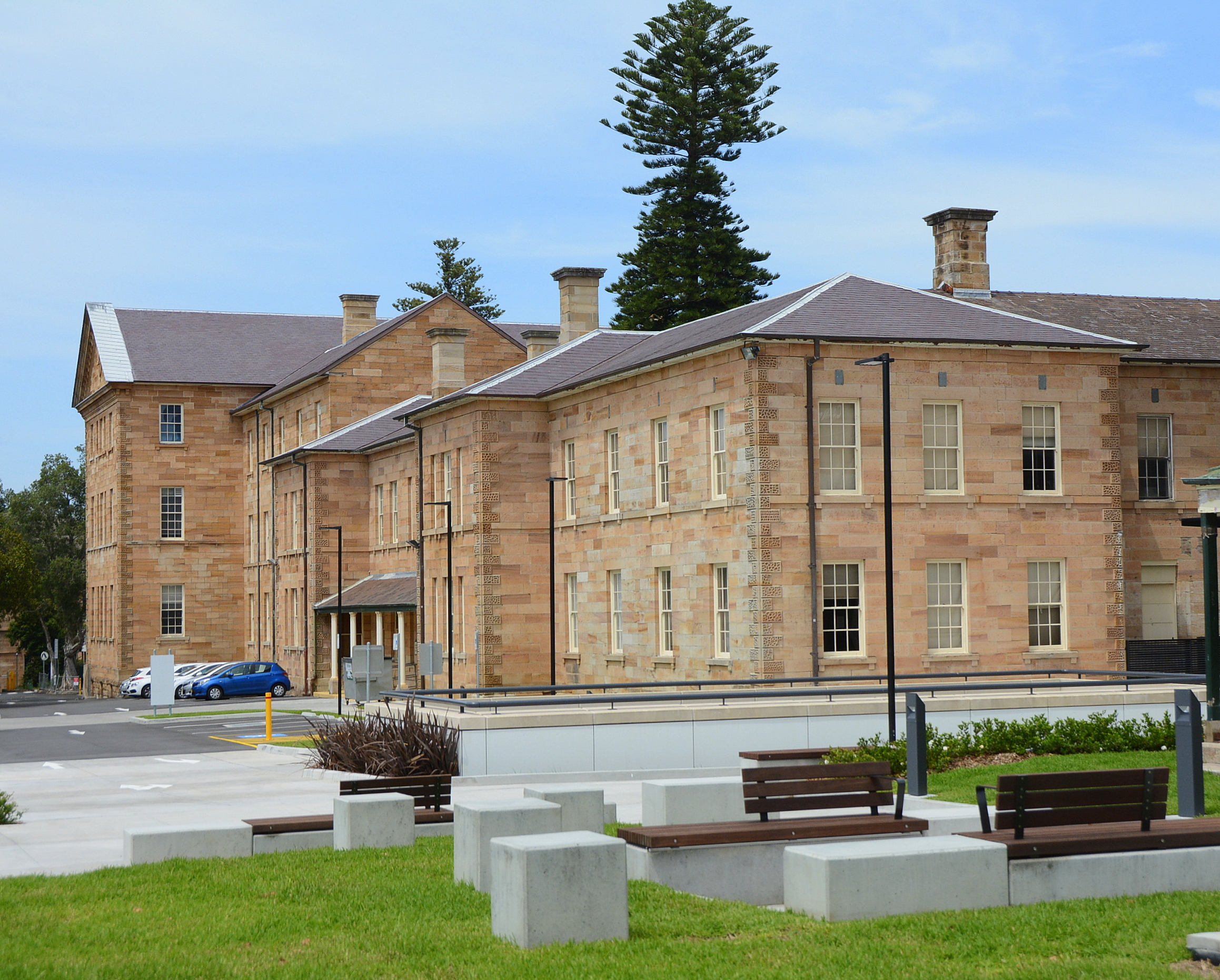
- Edmund Blacket building at the hospital

Geography
- Location: Randwick, Sydney, New South Wales, Australia
- Coordinates: 33°55′07″S 151°14′20″E

Organisation
- Care system: Public Medicare (AU)
- Type: Teaching
- Affiliated university: University of New South Wales

Services
- Emergency department: Yes
- Beds: 440

Helipads
- Helipad: (ICAO: YXSN)
Number	Length		Surface
Number	ft	m	Surface
1			concrete
2			concrete

History
- Founded: 1852

Links
- Lists: Hospitals in Australia

The Prince of Wales Hospital is a 440-bed major public teaching hospital located in Sydney's eastern suburb of Randwick, providing a full range of hospital services to the people of New South Wales, Australia. The hospital has strong ties to the adjacent University of New South Wales. The Prince of Wales Hospital shares the Randwick Hospitals' Campus site with the Sydney Children's Hospital and the Royal Hospital for Women, as well as the Prince of Wales Private Hospital.

== History ==
The Prince of Wales Hospital had its origins in 1852 with the formation of the Society for Destitute Children which established the Asylum for Destitute Children with the first building opened on 21 March 1858 in Paddington.

After an appeal for funds in 1870, the Catherine Hayes Hospital—a separate facility located in Avoca Street, Randwick—opened, reputedly with plans approved by Florence Nightingale.

In 1915, during the First World War the hospital was converted by the NSW Government into a military hospital and then a repatriation hospital, and renamed the Fourth Australian Repatriation Hospital. In 1927 an association between the Coast Hospital and the Fourth Australian Repatriation Hospital at Randwick began. With the opening of the Concord Repatriation General Hospital in 1953, the Randwick hospital was renamed the Prince of Wales Hospital, and operated as an annex of Sydney Hospital. Restructuring and hospital redevelopment has continued to occur to enhance the medical and patient facilities of the hospital, including amalgamation with the Prince Henry Hospital, Royal South Sydney Hospital and the Eastern Suburbs Hospital.

=== Prince Henry Hospital ===
Originally known as the Coast Hospital, Prince Henry had its origins managing patients with infectious diseases such as smallpox (outbreak in 1881), diphtheria, tuberculosis and scarlet fever. In 1900 there was an outbreak of the bubonic plague, with 303 cases reported and 103 deaths, and a further outbreak in 1921. In 1919 the 1918 flu pandemic reached Sydney, requiring the full resources of the hospital.

Within its grounds was a lazar house for the treatment/quarantining of those with leprosy. During both world wars soldiers with venereal disease were admitted to the hospital.

In 1934 the Coast Hospital was renamed the Prince Henry Hospital of Sydney on the occasion of the visit of the Prince Henry, Duke of Gloucester, and major building works commenced to increase the capacity to 1000 beds. With the passing of the Prince Henry Hospital Act 1936, it became a postgraduate teaching hospital. The Institute of Epidemiology and Preventative Medicine was established in 1946 and was instrumental in investigating the incidence of the Coxsackie virus (aseptic meningitis), poliomyelitis virus and was the first to isolate REO virus.

In 1970 the management of three hospitals – Prince Henry, Prince of Wales and Eastern Suburbs – was brought under one board. In 2001 Prince Henry's services were relocated to Randwick, where they were absorbed by Prince of Wales.

The Prince Henry site has since been sold for a housing redevelopment. According to the developer, Landcom, 19 NSW Heritage Registered buildings and features have been preserved. These include the RAF Memorial Clock tower, the wishing well, the water tower and original gates, as well as artisans' cottages and the Pine Cottage and Flowers wards.

Many of those who died at the hospital were buried at the Coast cemetery at Cape Banks.

==== Gallery ====
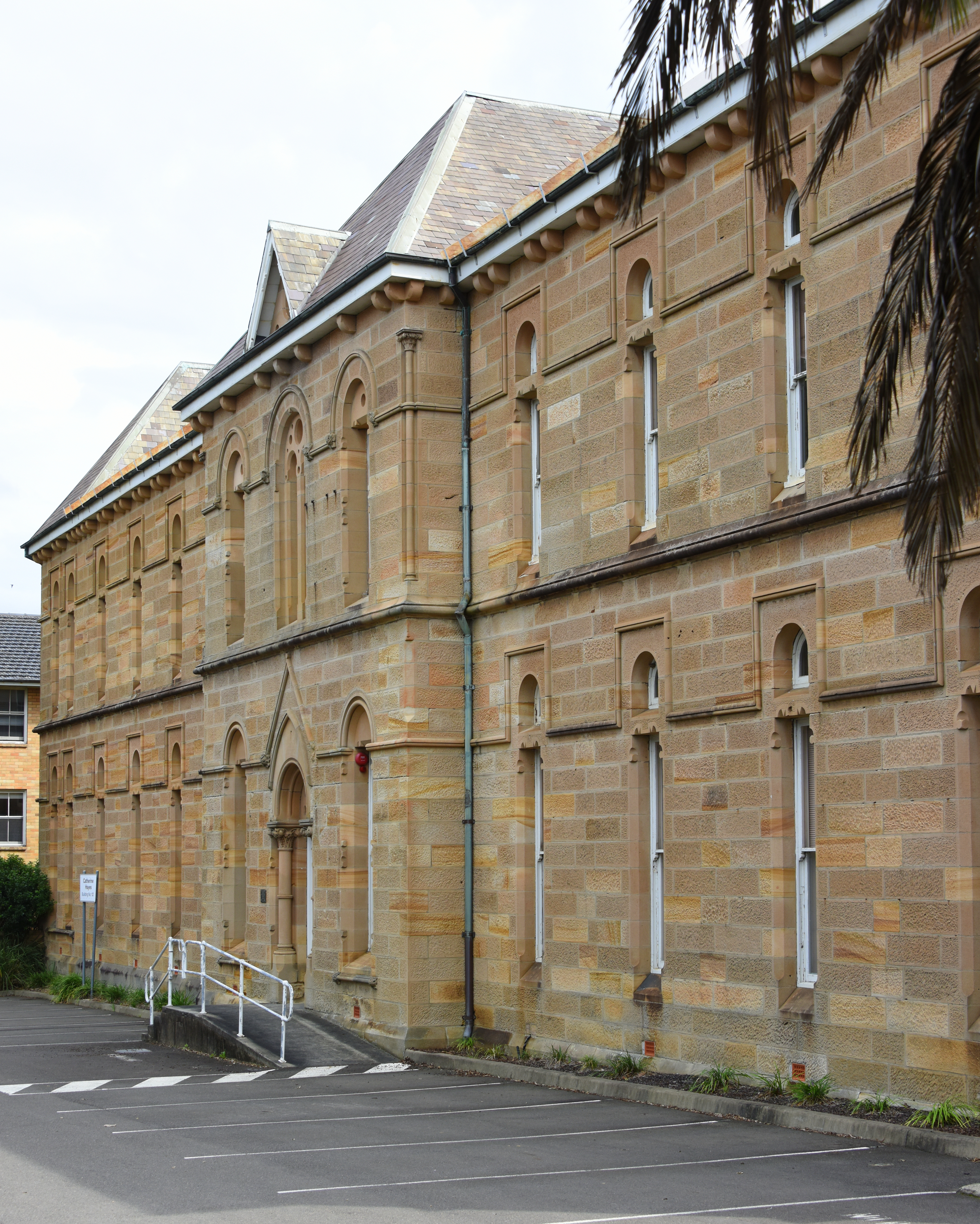
Catherine Hayes Building, Prince of Wales

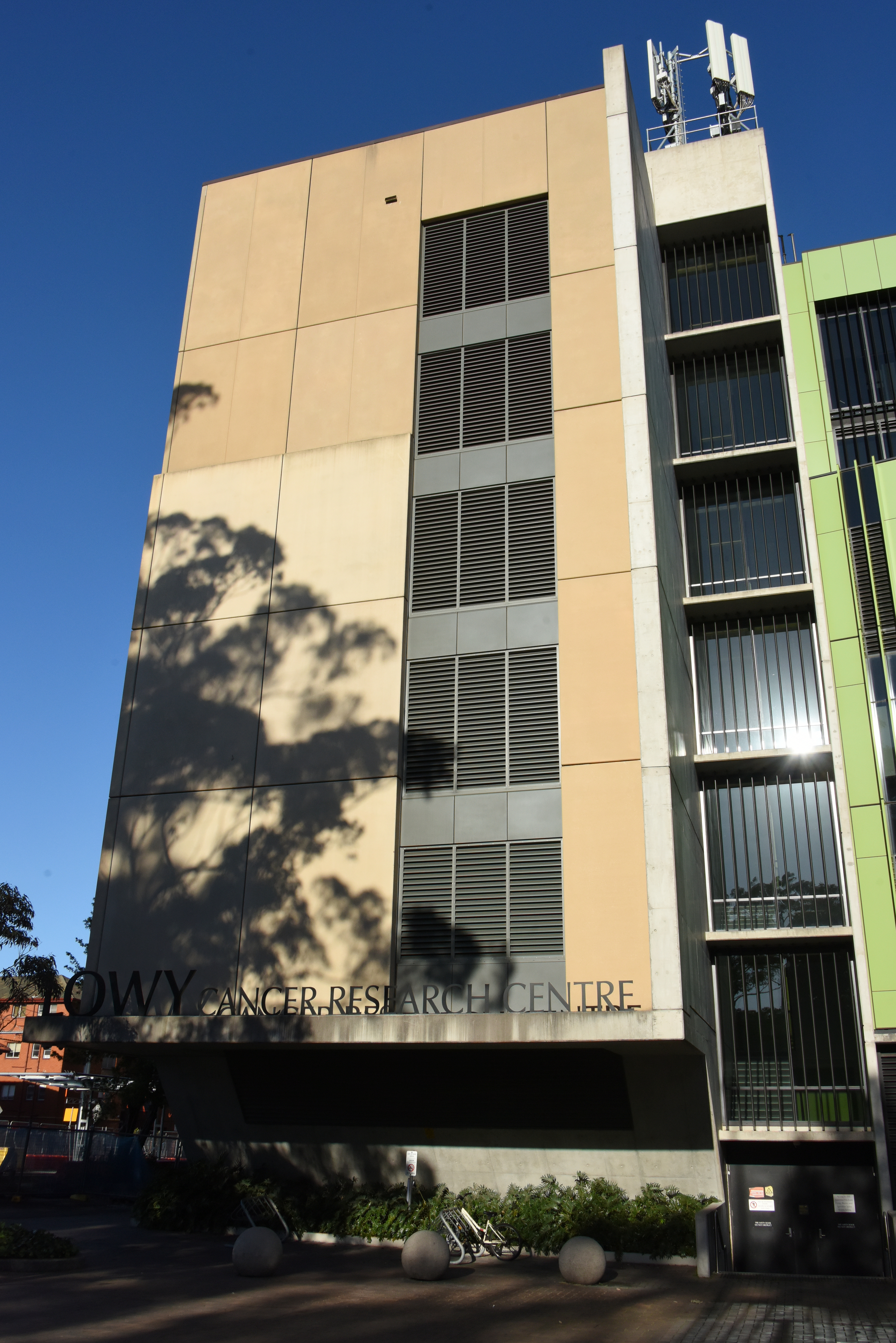
Lowy Cancer Research Centre, Prince of Wales

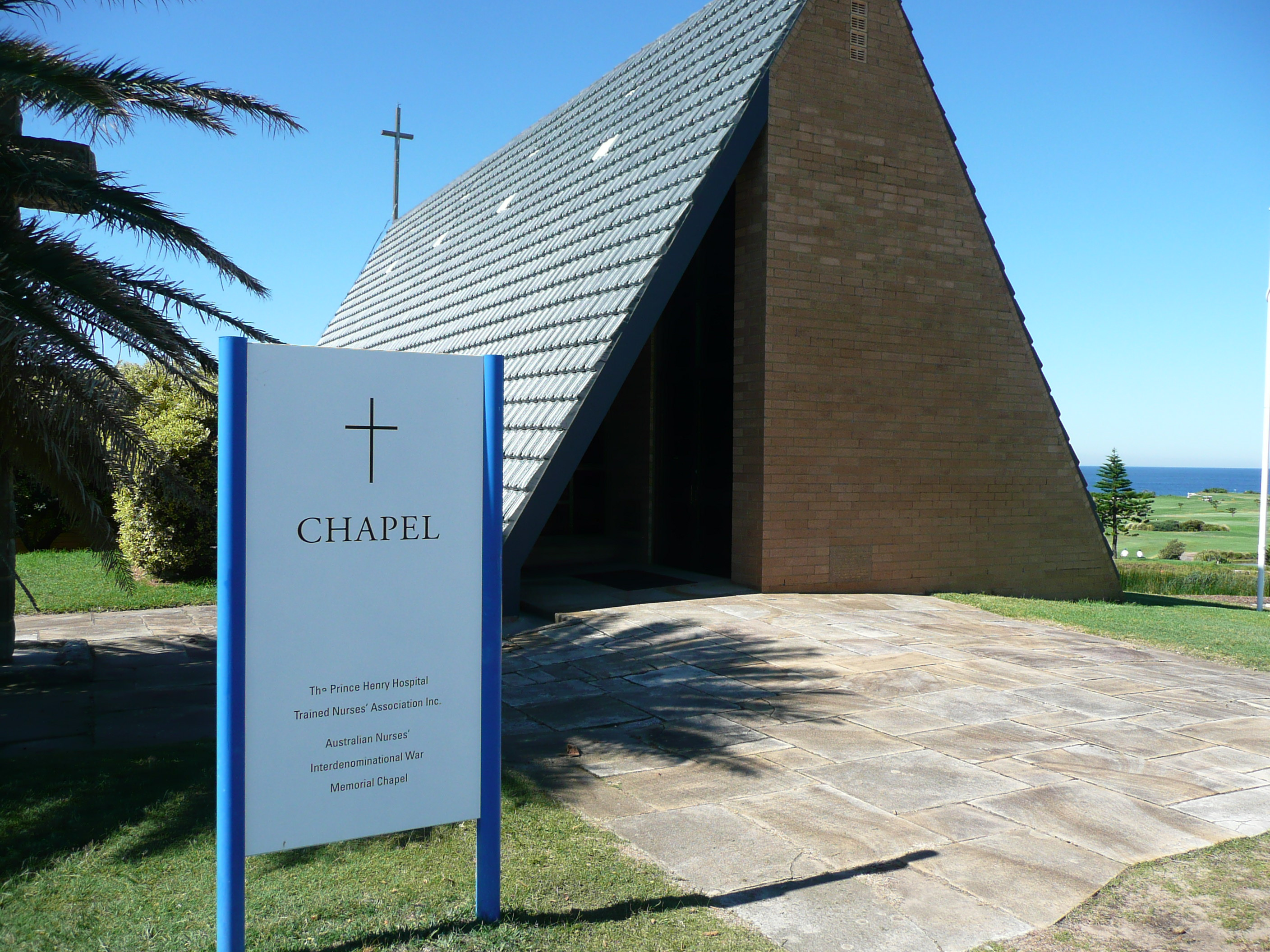
War Memorial Chapel, Prince Henry

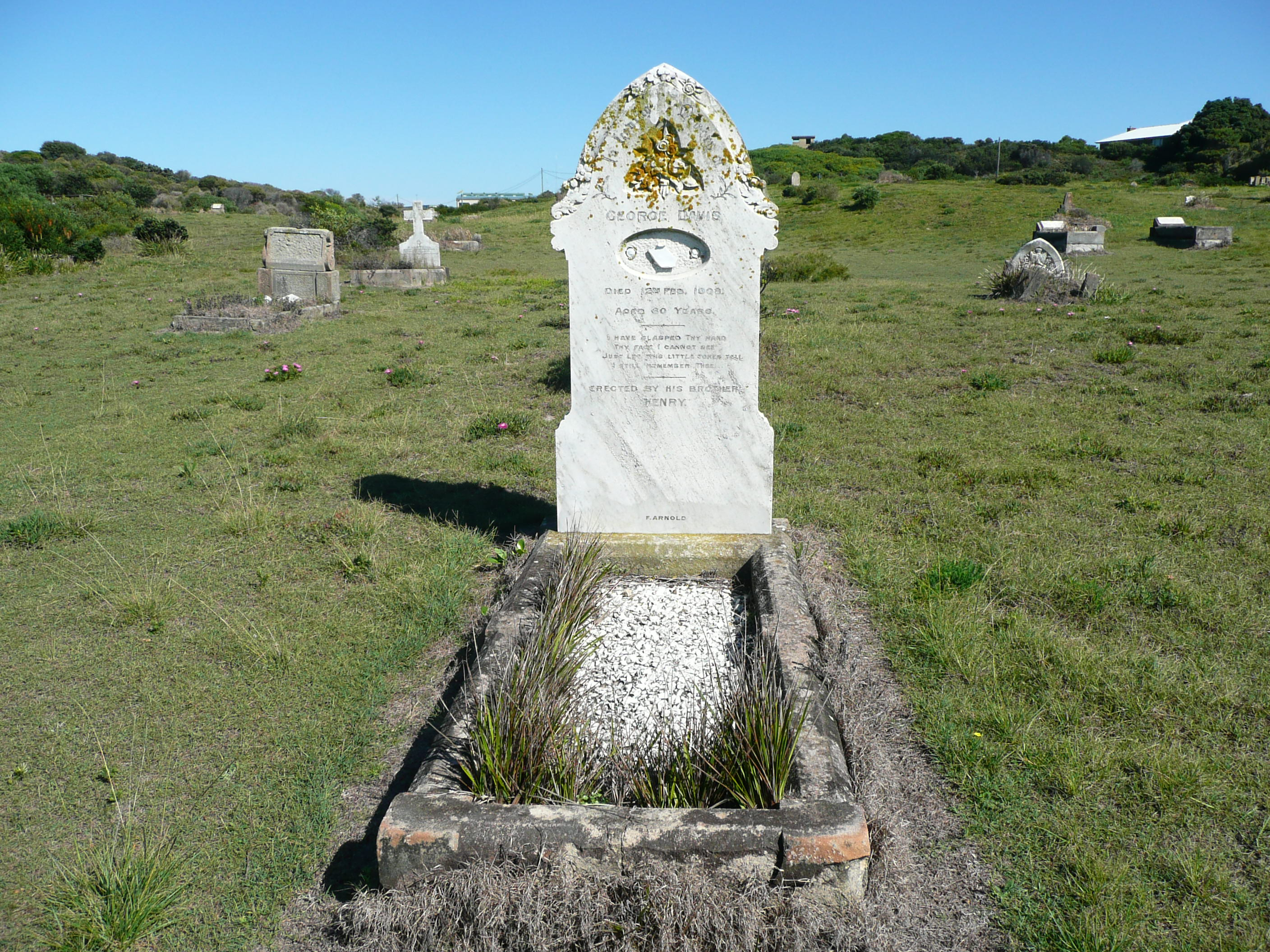
Coast Cemetery, originally attached to Coast Hospital

Gatehouse to Prince Henry Hospital as it appeared in 1881.

=== Royal South Sydney Hospital ===
In the early 1900s, Sir James Joynton Smith, a hotel, tourism and sports entrepreneur, began a push for a public hospital in South Sydney. At a public meeting at Redfern Town Hall in 1908, Smith was elected provisional president of a future public hospital on the site, which was adjacent to Victoria Park racecourse, which he established and owned. A furious fundraising drive then began.

The hospital foundation stone was laid on 21 October 1909, with the hospital opening in August 1913. The royal title was conferred in December 1917. The hospital was entirely used to treat influenza patients in the pandemic of 1919. In September 1991 the hospital became part of the Prince Henry, Prince of Wales and Prince of Wales Children's Hospitals Group.

=== Eastern Suburbs Hospital ===
The Eastern Suburbs Hospital opened in February 1935 on a 20,000-square-metre (5-acre) site near Queen's Park, after agitation from the community from 1924. During the Second World War, the hospital was used by the U.S. Navy Authority as a Naval Hospital from 1943 to 1944. In 1968 the hospital board was disbanded and administration of the hospital was taken over by the joint Boards of Directors of The Prince Henry and The Prince of Wales hospitals. The Eastern Suburbs hospital officially closed on 30 June 1980; the buildings now form part of Moriah College.

== See also ==
- Fred Hollows - Ophthalmology
- Prince of Wales Medical Research Institute
- List of hospitals in Australia
- Little Bay, New South Wales
