= Delayed onset muscle soreness =

Muscle pain after exercise

- Other names: Muscle fever
- Specialty: Sports medicine

Delayed onset muscle soreness (DOMS) is the pain and stiffness felt in muscles after unaccustomed or strenuous exercise. The soreness is felt most strongly 24 to 72 hours after the exercise. It is thought to be caused by eccentric (lengthening) exercise, which causes small-scale damage (microtrauma) to the muscle fibers. After such exercise, the muscle adapts rapidly to prevent muscle damage, and thereby soreness, if the exercise is repeated.

Delayed onset muscle soreness is one symptom of exercise-induced muscle damage. The other is acute muscle soreness, which appears during and immediately after exercise.

== Signs and symptoms ==
The soreness is perceived as a dull, aching pain in the affected muscle, often combined with tenderness and stiffness. The pain is typically felt only when the muscle is stretched, contracted or put under pressure, not when it is at rest. This tenderness, a characteristic symptom of DOMS, is also referred to as "muscular mechanical hyperalgesia".

Although there is variance among exercises and individuals, the soreness from DOMS usually increases in intensity in the first 24 hours after exercise. It peaks from 24 to 72 hours, then subsides and disappears up to seven days after exercise.

== Cause ==
Muscle soreness is caused by eccentric exercise, that is, exercise consisting of eccentric (lengthening) contractions of the muscle. Isometric (static) exercise causes much less soreness, and concentric (shortening) exercise causes none.

== Mechanism ==
The mechanism of delayed onset muscle soreness is not completely understood, but the pain is ultimately thought to be a result of microtrauma—mechanical damage at a very small scale—to the muscles being exercised.

DOMS was first described in 1902 by Theodore Hough, who concluded that this kind of soreness is "fundamentally the result of ruptures within the muscle". According to this "muscle damage" theory of DOMS, these ruptures are microscopic lesions at the Z-line of the muscle sarcomere. The soreness has been attributed to the increased tension force and muscle lengthening from eccentric exercise. This may cause the actin and myosin cross-bridges to separate prior to relaxation, ultimately causing greater tension on the remaining active motor units. This increases the risk of broadening, smearing, and damage to the sarcomere. When microtrauma occurs to these structures, nociceptors (pain receptors) within the muscle's connective tissues are stimulated and cause a sensation of pain.

Another explanation for the pain associated with DOMS is the "enzyme efflux" theory. Following microtrauma, calcium that is normally stored in the sarcoplasmic reticulum accumulates in the damaged muscles. Cellular respiration is inhibited and adenosine triphosphate (ATP) needed to actively transport calcium back into the sarcoplasmic reticulum is produced at a lower rate. This accumulation of calcium may activate proteases and phospholipases which in turn break down and degenerate muscle protein. This causes inflammation, and in turn pain due to the accumulation of histamines, prostaglandins, and potassium.

An earlier theory posited that DOMS is connected to the build-up of lactic acid in the blood, which was thought to continue being produced following exercise. This build-up of lactic acid was thought to be a toxic metabolic waste product that caused the perception of pain at a delayed stage. This theory has been largely rejected, as concentric contractions which also produce lactic acid have been unable to cause DOMS. Additionally, lactic acid is known from multiple studies to return to normal levels within one hour of exercise, and therefore cannot cause the pain that occurs much later.

=== Relation to other effects ===
Although delayed onset muscle soreness is a symptom associated with muscle damage, its magnitude does not necessarily reflect the magnitude of muscle damage.

Soreness is one of the temporary changes caused in muscles by unaccustomed eccentric exercise. Other such changes include decreased muscle strength, reduced range of motion, and muscle swelling. It has been shown, however, that these changes develop independently in time from one another and that the soreness is therefore not the cause of the reduction in muscle function.

=== Possible function as a warning sign ===
Soreness might conceivably serve as a warning to reduce muscle activity to prevent injury or further injury. With delayed onset muscle soreness (DOMS) caused by eccentric exercise (muscle lengthening), it was observed that light concentric exercise (muscle shortening) during DOMS can cause initially more pain but was followed by a temporary alleviation of soreness with no adverse effects on muscle function or recovery being observed. Furthermore, eccentric exercise during DOMS was found to not exacerbate muscle damage, nor did it have an adverse effect on recovery, indicating that soreness is not necessarily a warning sign to reduce the usage of the affected muscle. However, it was also observed that a second bout of eccentric exercise within one week of the initial exercise did lead to decreased muscle function immediately afterward.

=== Repeated-bout effect ===
After performing an unaccustomed eccentric exercise and exhibiting severe soreness, the muscle rapidly adapts to reduce further damage from the same exercise. This is called the "repeated-bout effect".

As a result of this effect, not only is the soreness reduced the next time the exercise is performed, but other indicators of muscle damage, such as swelling, reduced strength, and reduced range of motion, are also more quickly recovered from. The effect is mostly, but not wholly, specific to the exercised muscle; experiments have shown that some of the protective effects are also conferred on other muscles.

The magnitude of the effect is subject to many variations, depending for instance on the time between bouts, the number and length of eccentric contractions, and the exercise mode. It also varies between people and between indicators of muscle damage. Generally, though, the protective effect lasts for at least several weeks. It seems to gradually decrease as the time between bouts increases and is undetectable after about one year.

The first bout does not need to be as intense as the subsequent bouts to confer at least some protection against soreness. For instance, eccentric exercise performed at 40% of maximal strength has been shown to confer a protection of 20–60% from muscle damage incurred by a 100% strength exercise two to three weeks later. Also, the repeated-bout effect appears even after a relatively small number of contractions, possibly as few as two. In one study, a first bout of 10, 20 or 50 contractions provided equal protection for a second bout of 50 contractions three weeks later.

The reason for the protective effect is not yet understood. A number of possible mechanisms, which may complement one another, have been proposed. These include neural adaptations (improved use and control of the muscle by the nervous system), mechanical adaptations (increased muscle stiffness or muscle support tissue), and cellular adaptations (adaptation to inflammatory response and increased protein synthesis, among others).

== Prevention ==
Delayed onset muscle soreness can be reduced or prevented by gradually increasing the intensity of a new exercise program, thereby taking advantage of the repeated-bout effect.

Soreness can theoretically be avoided by limiting exercise to concentric and isometric contractions, but eccentric contractions in some muscles are normally unavoidable during exercise, especially when muscles are fatigued. Limiting the length of eccentric muscle extensions during exercise may afford some protection against soreness, but this may also not be practical depending on the mode of exercise.

Physical activity before eccentric exercise helps to prevent delayed-onset muscle soreness. Static stretching or warming up the muscles before or after exercise does not prevent soreness.

== Treatment ==
The soreness usually disappears within about 72 hours after appearing. If treatment is desired, any measure that increases blood flow to the muscle, such as low-intensity activity, massage, nerve mobilization, hot baths, or a sauna visit may help somewhat.

Meta-analyses have concluded that there is insufficient evidence or evidence against the effectiveness of whole-body cryotherapy—compared with passive rest or no whole-body cryotherapy—at reducing DOMS or improving the timeline of recovery from DOMS after exercise.

Counterintuitively, continued exercise may temporarily suppress the soreness. Exercise increases pain thresholds and pain tolerance. This effect, called exercise-induced analgesia, is known to occur in endurance training (running, cycling, swimming), but little is known about whether it also occurs in strength training. There are claims in the literature that exercising sore muscles appears to be the best way to reduce or eliminate the soreness, but this has not yet been systematically investigated.
