= Simon Gandevia =

Australian clinical neurophysiologist and researcher

Simon Gandevia is from Melbourne, Australia. He studied at the University of New South Wales where he received three research doctorates: PhD, MD, and DSc. Gandevia's current research focuses primarily on the relationship between the human brain and movement. His work contributes to various sub-fields within medicine particularly focusing on pathological mechanisms, such as neurology, cardiorespiratory medicine and rehabilitation. In addition, he worked with many editorial boards such as the Journal of Physiology. Gandevia had supervised and trained several doctoral students. Gandevia also writes about research ethics and quality of experimental procedures in order to facilitate the development of concepts about ethics in human experimental studies. In 1998, Gandevia was elected a Fellow of the Australian Academy of Science, and the Australian Academy of Health and Medical Science in 2016.

== Early life ==
Gandevia is originally from Melbourne, Australia. Both his parents were physicians. During the Korean War, Gandevia's father was a regimental medical officer with an Australian infantry battalion. Gandevia currently resides in Australia with his wife Julie. Gandevia and his wife are known for their interest of bonsai trees during their leisure time. Gandevia is also an artist who carves sculptures from limestone.

== Education ==
Simon Gandevia completed a Bachelor of Medicine and Bachelor of Surgery at the University of New South Wales. Gandevia went on to complete an undergraduate in physiology. After completing this degree, Gandevia went on to complete a Doctor of Medicine at the Prince Henry Hospital under David Burke's supervision. Ian McCloskey supervised Gandevia through his PhD on human movement control and proprioception at the University of New South Wales. He also holds a Doctor of Science degree from the University of New South Wales.

== Career history ==
Gandevia is a clinical neurophysiologist who focuses his research and clinical work primarily on patients with spinal cord injury and neuromuscular disorders. Gandevia, together with three other scientists, founded Neuroscience Research Australia (NeuRA), previously known as the Prince of Wales Medical Research Institute. Gandevia's research falls into the following four categories: neural mechanisms of proprioception, neural control of muscle performance (focusing on muscle fatigue), control of human breathing muscles, and passive properties of muscles. Through his research, he investigated the neuropathology: stroke, spinal cord injury, prior—polio, asthma, chronic obstructive pulmonary disease, and obstructive apnoea. Currently, his focus is on programs dealing with pathophysiology and motor impairments. Gandevia is the only researcher to have published more than 100 papers in the Journal of Physiology in the year of 2011.

Gandevia acts as the deputy director for the Prince of Wales Medical Research Institute and the co-director of the Spinal Injuries Research Centre at the institute. In addition to working as a Professor at the University of South New Wales, he also is an Honorary Professor of Physiotherapy at the University of Queensland and the University of Sydney. Gandevia also occupies a position within the National Health and Medical Research Council as a Senior Principal Research Fellow. Previously, Gandevia has worked at international institutes such as Yale University, McMaster University, California Institute of Technology, the Department of Neurology at the Institute of Psychiatry, and the Institute of Neurology, London. He has also occupied editorial board positions in several journals such as the Journal of Applied Physiology and Respiration Physiology, Acta Physiologica Scandinavica and the Journal of Physiology.

=== Awards ===
Gandevia has been awarded the Paxinos-Watson prize of the Australian Neuroscience Society, the Edgeworth David Medal of the Royal Society of New South Wales and the Centenary Medal of Australia.

== Research ==
=== Motor impairment ===
At NeuRA, Simon Gandevia studies the mechanisms underlying everyday motor activities such as balancing and walking. Through randomized control trials, he is investigating new treatment options to reduce the severity of motor impairment and understand the underlying physiology of motor disorders.

Gandevia founded the Motor Impairment Program at Neuroscience Research Australia, an initiative designed to research and treat a range of motor impairments. He serves as the Project Coordinator for the programme, which is funded by the National Health and Medical Research Council. The goal of this initiative is to address gaps in existing knowledge about the pathways leading to motor impairment. Gandevia and his team have designed the program to focus mainly on three areas: muscle contraction, fatigue, and impaired balance. With his team, Gandevia has conducted the largest study examining physiological factors contributing to falls in patients diagnosed with multiple sclerosis. He has also compiled the first description of the three-dimensional changes that occur when muscles contract. Since its inception in 2014, the project has published over 150 manuscripts in journals including The Lancet, JAMA and Journal of Physiology. Gandevia has also developed the Upper Limb Physiological Profile Assessment, a screening tool used to identify motor impairments.

=== Breathing ===
Gandevia also researches breathlessness. Gandevia and his colleagues completed an experiment examining the underlying causes of breathlessness. The experiment involved putting participants in a state of paralysis by restricting the regular rate of breathing, causing increased carbon dioxide levels in blood. This experiment confirmed the role of brain receptors in the detection of increased levels of carbon dioxide.

Gandevia conducted research to understand the neurophysiological control of breathing muscles, especially in cases of spinal injury, sleep apnea and chronic obstructive lung disease. Research in this area contributes to the treatment of respiratory impairments in the elderly. He has contributed to the development of new imaging methods using techniques such as ultrasounds and functional magnetic resonance imaging. Gandevia and fellow researchers at NeurRA have proposed a novel therapy for the complication of coughing in stroke patients, which involved the electrical stimulation of abdominal muscles to correct muscular behaviour.

=== Publications ===
Simon Gandevia has authored over 390 scientific papers and has submitted numerous conference abstracts. In 2002, he co-wrote a book titled Sensorimotor Control of Movement and Posture. It contains a compilation of research presented at a conference held at Cairns, Australia which examined the topic of sensorimotor control from a neural perspective. He has also written chapters in several books such as Proprioceptive Mechanisms and the Human Hand, The Neural Control of Human Inspiratory Muscles, Microneurography and Motor Disorders, Proprioception: Peripheral Inputs and Perceptual Interactions, Mechanical, Neural, and Perceptual Effects of Tendon Vibration, Properties of Human Peripheral Nerves: Implications for Studies of Human Motor Control and Mind Over Muscle: The Role of the CNS in Human Muscle Performance.

=== Replication crisis ===
In the article published in The Conversation titled, "We need to talk about the bad science being funded", Gandevia highlights the replication crisis in modern science. Citing a statistic from the magazine Nature which finds some, 90% of 1576 researchers surveyed believe in a replication crisis. Gandevia stresses that ‘a high rate of [...] false discoveries’ and ‘low statistical power to identify a genuine discovery’ poses harms to published scientific literature.

Gandevia mentions that many researches are ‘fiddling [with] the primary hypothesis’ after research has been completed or after statistically significant results have been found. He emphasizes the use of the ‘publish or perish’ paradigm in science, which hinders academic progress by selectively publishing only favourable or statistically significant results. To counter this problem, he has advocated for the introduction of appropriate publication channels to make research data open-source.

Gandevia also addresses the need to fund what he describes as correct research studies. He has expressed that the view that research funding should go to studies pursuing the discovery of novel information in favour of studies that have low statistical power and limited relevance to the scientific majors. He has attributed the use of substandard practices in research to the intense competition that exits in academia. Gandevia has suggested that 'Good science loses out when bad science gets the funding.' He has emphasized the need to impose a strict selection criteria that involves a careful assessment of the impact of potential studies by the government and other funding bodies for providing funds.

In 2023, Gandevia and collaborators launched Retractions Australia, an online resource dedicated to highlighting data regarding scientific retractions. Gandevia continues to advocate for high scientific standards and has "increasingly strong concerns about the direction of the country’s research establishment".

== Personal life ==
=== Sculpture ===
Despite being a medical scientist, Gandevia also attended classes at the Waverley Woollahra Art Centre and later at the Tom Bass Sculpture Studio School to learn sculpting where he engaged primarily in sandstone carving. Through a series of workshops with Paul Hopmeier, he was able to develop skills in carving limestone. He explored the incorporation of found objects in sculpturing by partaking in sessions delivered by Anita Larkin. Simon Gandevia makes weekly additions to his ‘2 Minute Sculpture Series’ with sculptures he creates from wood and stone amongst other media. In 2015, he organized his first art exhibition at the Clara St Gallery Erskineville where he sold some of his artwork with the resulting proceeds being donated to Médecins Sans Frontières (Doctors without Borders).

=== Plants ===
In addition to engaging in sculpturing, Gandevia also devotes his time to the growth and care of bonsai trees. He has also been a significant contributor in the development of three gardens modelled in the Japanese style, one of which is located at Neuroscience Research Australia.

== See also ==
- Neuroscience Research Australia
