= Black Dog Institute =

Australian mental health charity

- Established: 2002
- Research type: Medical research, health education
- Location: Sydney, New South Wales
- Affiliations: Prince of Wales Hospital, UNSW
- Website: https://www.blackdoginstitute.org.au

The Black Dog Institute is a not-for-profit facility for diagnosis, treatment and prevention of mood disorders such as depression, anxiety and bipolar disorder. It was founded in 2002 by the UNSW School of Psychiatry Scientia Professor Gordon Parker and is based in Sydney, Australia.

== Research ==
The Black Dog Institute undertakes research into the prevention, early intervention and treatment of depression, bipolar disorder, PTSD, and anxiety. They partner with the Australian Centre for Research Excellence in Suicide Prevention (CRESP) concerned with lowering suicide rates in Australia. According to CRESP, suicide is the most common cause of death in Australians aged 15–44 years – more common than deaths from motor vehicle accidents or skin cancer and the tenth most common cause of death overall for Australian males. The problem is worse in rural and regional areas, according to a 2012 study by Griffith University.

The Black Dog Institute launched “Men’s Health Study” in 2014, with the aim of identifying ways to prevent male suicides and developing mental health tools designed specifically for men. Based on this research, the Black Dog Institute launched an online program, Man Central, that helps men identify early signs of depression and provides tips on how to cope.

In 2018, Black Dog Institute became part of a cooperative partnership of four clinical, educational and research allies, including Neuroscience Research Australia (NeuRA), South Eastern Sydney Local Health District (SESLHD) and UNSW Sydney to create Mindgardens Neuroscience Network, which became the largest brain-related collaboration between researchers and clinicians in the Southern Hemisphere.

Researchers affiliated with the Black Dog Institute have contributed to public health communication on mental health topics. In 2026, Emily Upton (PhD Candidate, UNSW Sydney/Black Dog Institute) and Kayla Steele (Postdoctoral Research Fellow and Clinical Psychologist, UNSW Sydney) authored an article published by The Conversation distinguishing anxiety disorders from obsessive-compulsive disorder (OCD), which was subsequently republished by The Independent. The article recommended support services including Beyond Blue, Headspace, and ReachOut for young people seeking mental health resources.

== Services ==
The Black Dog Institute runs three clinics available to Australian residents: Depression and Bipolar Clinic, Psychology Clinic, Child and Adolescent Clinic, Rural and Telepsychiatry Clinic. Additionally, the facility offers seminars and workshops on mood disorders, well-being and related topics. The Black Dog Institute has developed a range of online tools including: myCompass and self-tests for depression, bipolar disorder, personality and workplace well-being.
