= Clinical Psychology Review =

- Discipline: Clinical Psychology
- Language: English
- Edited by: Gordon J. G. Asmundson

Publication details
- History: 1981–present
- Publisher: Elsevier
- Open access: Hybrid
- Impact factor: 12.792 (2020)

Standard abbreviations
- ISO 4: Clin. Psychol. Rev.

Indexing
- ISSN: 0272-7358
- OCLC no.: 639061884

Links
- Journal homepage

Clinical Psychology Review is a peer-reviewed academic journal that publishes reviews on topics relevant to the field of clinical psychology. Gordon J. G. Asmundson (University of Regina) serves as the Editor-In-Chief of the journal with associate editors Ernst Koster (Universiteit Gent), Christine Purdon (University of Waterloo), Annemieke van Straten (Vrije Universiteit Amsterdam), and Michael J. Zvolensky (University of Houston). Clinical Psychology Review has a Cite Score of 18.1 and an impact factor of 12.792 (2020) ranking it 2nd out of 131 journals in clinical psychology.

== Indexing of publications ==
Clinical Psychology Review is indexed in 7 international databases to promote global reach with inclusion in BIOSIS Citation Index, Current Contents – Social & Behavioral Sciences, Embase, Google Scholar, PsycINFO, PubMed/ Medline, and Scopus.
