= List of geological features on Titan =

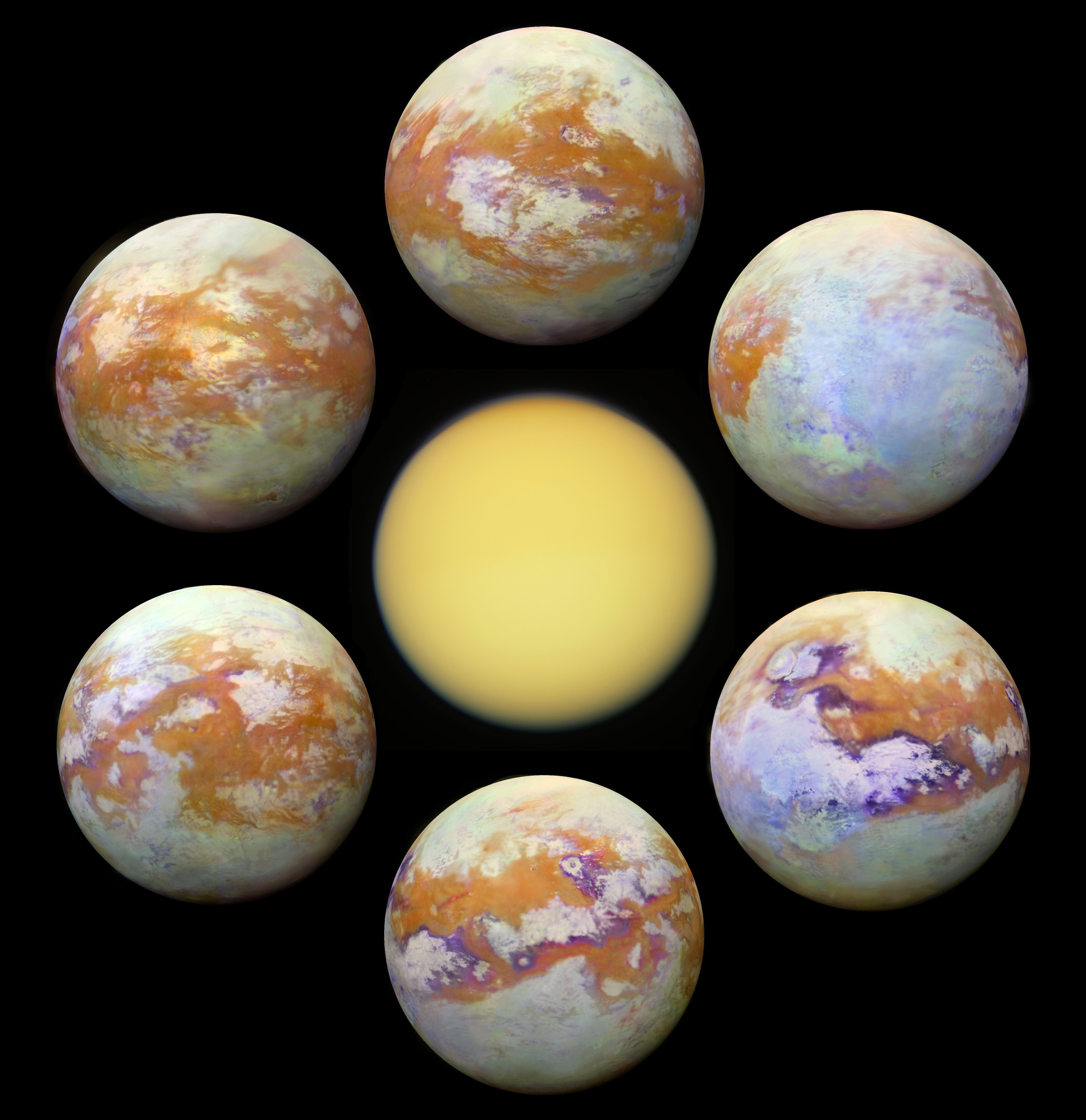
Titan – infrared views (2004–2017)

This is a list of named geological features on Saturn's moon Titan. Official names for these features have only been announced since the 2000s, as Titan's surface was virtually unknown before the arrival of the Cassini–Huygens probe.

The largest single feature on Titan is Xanadu, a highly reflective ridgelike area close to the satellite's equatory. Some features were known by informal nicknames beforehand; these names are noted where appropriate. Note that some features with a physical size given by "diameter" may not be circular; then the number refers to the length. (Note: The USGS web site gives size as a "diameter", but it is actually the length in the longest dimension.)

== Albedo features ==
Albedo features on Titan are named after sacred or enchanted places in world mythologies and literature.

=== Bright albedo features ===
Global map of Titan – with IAU surface features labeled. (April 2026)

Name	Coordinates	Diameter (km)	Approval Date	Named After	Ref
Adiri	10°S 210°W	0	2006	Adiri, Melanesian paradise	WGPSN
Dilmun	15°N 175°W	0	2006	Dilmun, Sumerian heaven	WGPSN
Quivira	0°N 15°W	0	2006	Quivira, legendary city in southwestern America	WGPSN
Tsegihi	40°S 10°W	0	2006	Tsegihi, Navajo sacred place	WGPSN
Xanadu	15°S 100°W	3400	2006	Xanadu, an imaginary palace in Coleridge's Kubla Khan	WGPSN

=== Dark albedo features ===
Name	Coordinates	Diameter (km)	Approval Date	Named After	Informal Name	Ref
Aaru	10°N 340°W	0	2006	Aaru, Egyptian paradise		WGPSN
Aztlan	10°S 20°W	0	2006	Aztlán, mythical Aztec homeland	Southern part of 'Lying H'	WGPSN
Belet	5°S 255°W	0	2006	Belet, Malay paradise		WGPSN
Ching-tu	30°S 205°W	0	2006	Ching-tu, Chinese Buddhist paradise		WGPSN
Fensal	5°N 30°W	0	2006	Fensalir, Norse heavenly mansion	Northern part of 'Lying H'	WGPSN
Mezzoramia	70°S 0°W	0	2006	Mezzoramia, African oasis of happiness from Italian legend		WGPSN
Senkyo	5°S 320°W	0	2006	Senkyo, Japanese paradise		WGPSN
Shangri-La	10°S 165°W	0	2006	Shangri-La, Tibetan paradise		WGPSN

== Arcūs ==
Titanean arcūs (arc-shaped features) are named after deities of happiness.

Name	Coordinates	Diameter (km)	Approval Date	Named After	Ref
Hotei Arcus	28°S 79°W	600	2006	Hotei, Japanese god	WGPSN

== Colles ==
Colles are small hills or knobs which are named after characters in J. R. R. Tolkien's Middle-earth.

Name	Coordinates	Diameter (km)	Approval Date	Named After	Ref
Arwen Colles	7.5°S 250.0°W	64	19 December 2012	Arwen, character from Tolkien's The Lord of the Rings trilogy	WGPSN
Bilbo Colles	4.2°S 38.6°W	164	19 December 2012	Bilbo Baggins, titular character of Tolkien's The Hobbit	WGPSN
Faramir Colles	4.0°N 153.8°W	82	19 December 2012	Faramir, character from Tolkien's The Lord of the Rings trilogy	WGPSN
Gandalf Colles	14.6°N 209.5°W	102	20 July 2015	Gandalf, character from Tolkien's The Lord of the Rings trilogy	WGPSN
Handir Colles	10.0°N 356.7°W	100	19 December 2012	Handir, character from Tolkien's The Silmarillion	WGPSN
Nimloth Colles	11.9°N 151.3°W	90	19 December 2012	Nimloth, name of a character and a tree from Tolkien's Middle-Earth	WGPSN

== Craters ==
Craters on Titan are named after deities of wisdom.

Name	Coordinates	Diameter (km)	Approval Date	Named After	Informal Name	Ref
Afekan	25.8°N 200.3°W	115.0	4 August 2008	Afekan, New Guinean creator goddess		WGPSN
Beag	34.7°S 169.6°W	145.0	15 April 2015	Beag, Irish/Celtic goddess		WGPSN
Forseti	25.5°N 10.4°W	115.0	15 April 2015	Forseti, Norse god		WGPSN
Hano	40.3°N 14.9°E	100.0	23 December 2011	Hano, Bella Coola (northwestern USA and western Canada) goddess of education knowledge and magic. She manifested as a shaman so she could teach the people		WGPSN
Ksa	14.0°N 65.4°W	29.0	11 October 2006	Ksa, Lakota/Oglala spirit		WGPSN
Menrva	20.1°N 87.2°W	392.0	2006	Menrva, Etruscan goddess	'Circus Maximus'	WGPSN
Momoy	11.6°N 44.6°W	40.0	23 December 2011	Momoy, Chumash ancestor shaman and goddess of magic		WGPSN
Mystis	0.1°N 194.9°W	20.0	20 July 2015	Mystis, Greek nymph		WGPSN
Selk	7.0°N 199.0°W	80.0	15 February 2008	Selk, Egyptian goddess		WGPSN
Sinlap	11.3°N 16.0°W	80.0	2006	Sinlap, Kachin spirit		WGPSN
Soi	24.3°N 140.9°W	75.0	3 February 2012	Soi, Melanesian (New Ireland Island Papua New Guinea) god of wisdom		WGPSN

== Faculae ==
Faculae (bright spots) are named after islands on Earth that are not politically independent. Groups of faculae are named after archipelagos on Earth.

Facula	Coordinates	Diameter (km)	Approval Date	Named after	Informal name	Ref
Antilia Faculae	11.0°S 187.0°W	260	2006	Antillia, mythical Atlantic archipelago		WGPSN
Bazaruto Facula	11.6°N 16.1°W	215	2006	Bazaruto, Mozambique island		WGPSN
Coats Facula	11.1°S 29.2°W	80	2006	Coats Island, Canada		WGPSN
Crete Facula	9.4°N 150.1°W	680	2006	Crete, Greek island		WGPSN
Elba Facula	10.8°S 1.2°W	250	2006	Elba, Italian island		WGPSN
Kerguelen Facula	5.4°S 151.0°W	135	2006	Kerguelen Islands, French subantarctic island		WGPSN
Mindanao Facula	6.6°S 174.2°W	210	2006	Mindanao, Philippine island	'Ireland'	WGPSN
Nicobar Faculae	2.0°N 159.0°W	575	2006	Nicobar Islands, Indian archipelago		WGPSN
Oahu Facula	5.0°N 166.7°W	465	2006	Oahu, Hawaiian island		WGPSN
Santorini Facula	2.4°N 145.6°W	140	2006	Santorini, Greek island		WGPSN
Shikoku Facula	10.4°S 164.1°W	285	2006	Shikoku, Japanese island	'Great Britain'	WGPSN
Tasmania Facula	10.41°N 167.37°W	26	14 April 2022	Tasmania		WGPSN
Texel Facula	11.5°S 182.6°W	190	2006	Texel, Dutch island	'Manhattan'	WGPSN
Tortola Facula	8.8°N 143.1°W	65	2006	Tortola, British Virgin Islands	'The Snail'	WGPSN
Vis Facula	7.0°N 138.4°W	215	2006	Vis, Croatian island		WGPSN

== Fluctūs ==
The term "fluctus" refers to flow terrain. Fluctūs on Titan are named after mythological figures associated with beauty.

Fluctus	Coordinates	Diameter (km)	Approval Date	Named after	Ref
Ara Fluctus	39.8°N 118.4°W	70	2 March 2007	Ara the Beautiful, Armenian legendary figure	WGPSN
Leilah Fluctus	50.5°N 77.8°W	190	2 March 2007	Layla, Persian goddess	WGPSN
Mohini Fluctus	11.78°S 38.53°W	347	13 November 2012	Mohini, Indian goddess of beauty and magic	WGPSN
Rohe Fluctus	47.3°N 37.75°W	103	2 March 2007	Rohe, Māori goddess	WGPSN
Winia Fluctus	49.0°N 46.0°W	300	2 March 2007	Winia, Indonesian first woman	WGPSN

== Flumina ==
A flumen is a feature that looks like a channel carved by liquid. Flumina refers to a network of rivers. Some flumina are not found near liquid bodies, which are labelled as "dry valley". They are named after mythical or imaginary rivers.

Flumina	Coordinates	Liquid Body (Note: "Dry valleys" apply to rivers that are not directly connected to a known liquid body (Mare or lacus).)	Length (km)	Approval Date	Named after	Ref
Apanohuaya Flumen	84.29°N 297.24°W	Punga Mare	64	12 March 2020	Apanohuaya, mythological river in the Aztec Underworld	WGPSN
Celadon Flumina	73.7°S 28.8°W	dry valley	160	8 October 2014	Celadon, river in Homer's Iliad	WGPSN
Elivagar Flumina	19.3°N 78.5°W	dry valley	260	27 September 2007	The Élivágar, a group of ice rivers in Norse mythology	WGPSN
Gihon Flumen	76.81°N 215.55°W	Ligeia Mare	225	14 December 2020	Gihon, Biblical second river of paradise that flows from Eden	WGPSN
Hubur Flumen	70.2°S 192.9°W	Ontario Lacus	84	27 December 2015	Hubur, river of the underworld in Mesopotamian mythology	WGPSN
Karesos Flumen	70.9°S 194.8°W	Ontario Lacus	83	27 December 2015	River in Homer's Iliad	WGPSN
Kokytos Flumina	72.71°N 255°W	Ligeia Mare	305	14 December 2020	Cocytus, river of lamentations in the Greek underworld	WGPSN
Sambation Flumina	87.33°N 90.12°W	Punga Mare	210	14 December 2020	Sambation, legendary river in Jewish literature	WGPSN
Saraswati Flumen	74.6°S 193.5°W	Ontario Lacus	>300	27 December 2015	Saraswati, river in Hindu mythology	WGPSN
Vid Flumina	72.9°N 242.5°W	Ligeia Mare	400	13 February 2013	One of the rivers in Élivágar.	WGPSN
Xanthus Flumen	83.47°N 242.76°W	Ligeia Mare	78	6 November 2015	Name of the Gods of the river Skamandros in the Iliad.	WGPSN

== Freta ==
A fretum (plural freta) is a strait of liquid connecting two larger liquid bodies. They are named after characters from the Foundation series of science fiction novels by Isaac Asimov.

Fretum	Coordinates	Length (km)	Approval Date	Named after	Informal name	Ref
Bayta Fretum	73°N 311.2°W	165	19 January 2015	Bayta Darell, fictional character in Isaac Asimov's Foundation Series, wife of the Trader Toran Darell and grandmother of famous author Arcadia Darell.		WGPSN
Hardin Fretum	57.3°N 317.8°W	246	19 January 2015	Salvor Hardin, fictional character in Isaac Asimov's Foundation Series, first Mayor of the planet Terminus.		WGPSN
Seldon Fretum	66°N 316.6°W	67	19 January 2015	Hari Seldon, the fictional, intellectual hero of Isaac Asimov's Foundation Series, First Minister of the Galactic Empire.	'Throat of Kraken'	WGPSN
Trevize Fretum	74.4°N 269.9°W	173	19 January 2015	Golan Trevize, fictional character in Isaac Asimov's Foundation Series, councilman of the planet Terminus.		WGPSN

== Insulae ==
Insulae are islands within Titan's seas. They are named after legendary islands.

Insula	Coordinates	Liquid body	Diameter (km)	Approval Date	Named after	Ref
Bermoothes Insula	67.1°N 317.1°W	Kraken Mare	124	19 January 2015	Bermoothes, an enchanted island in Shakespeare's Tempest	WGPSN
Bimini Insula	73.3°N 305.4°W	Kraken Mare	39	19 January 2015	Bimini, island in Arawak legend said to contain the fountain of youth.	WGPSN
Bralgu Insula	76.2°N 251.5°W	Ligeia Mare	55	19 January 2015	Baralku, in Yolngu culture, the island of the dead and the place where the Djanggawul, the three creator siblings, originated.	WGPSN
Buyan Insula	77.3°N 245.1°W	Ligeia Mare	48	19 January 2015	Buyan, a rocky island in Russian folk tales located on the south shore of Baltic Sea	WGPSN
Hawaiki Insulae	84.32°N 327.07°W	Punga Mare	35	14 December 2020	Hawaiki, original home island of the Polynesian people in local mythology	WGPSN
Hufaidh Insulae	67°N 320.3°W	Kraken Mare	152	19 January 2015	Hufaidh, legendary island in the marshes of southern Iraq	WGPSN
Krocylea Insulae	69.1°N 302.4°W	Kraken Mare	74	19 January 2015	Crocylea, mythological Greek island in the Ionian Sea, near Ithaca	WGPSN
Mayda Insula	79.1°N 312.2°W	Kraken Mare	168	11 April 2008	Mayda, legendary island in the northeast Atlantic	WGPSN
Meropis Insula	83.85°N 313.68°W	Punga Mare	30	14 December 2020	Meropis, fictional island mentioned by ancient Greek writer Theopompus in his work Philippica	WGPSN
Onogoro Insula	83.28°N 311.7°W	Punga Mare	15	14 December 2020	Onogoro Island, Japanese mythological island	WGPSN
Penglai Insula	72.2°N 308.7°W	Kraken Mare	94	19 January 2015	Penglai, mythological Chinese mountain island where immortals and gods lived.	WGPSN
Planctae Insulae	77.5°N 251.3°W	Ligeia Mare	64	19 January 2015	Symplegades, the "clashing rocks" in Bosphorus which only Argo was said to have successfully passed.	WGPSN
Royllo Insula	68.3°N 297.2°W	Kraken Mare	103	19 January 2015	Royllo, legendary island in the Atlantic, on verge of unknown, near Antilla and Saint Brandan.	WGPSN

== Labyrinthi ==
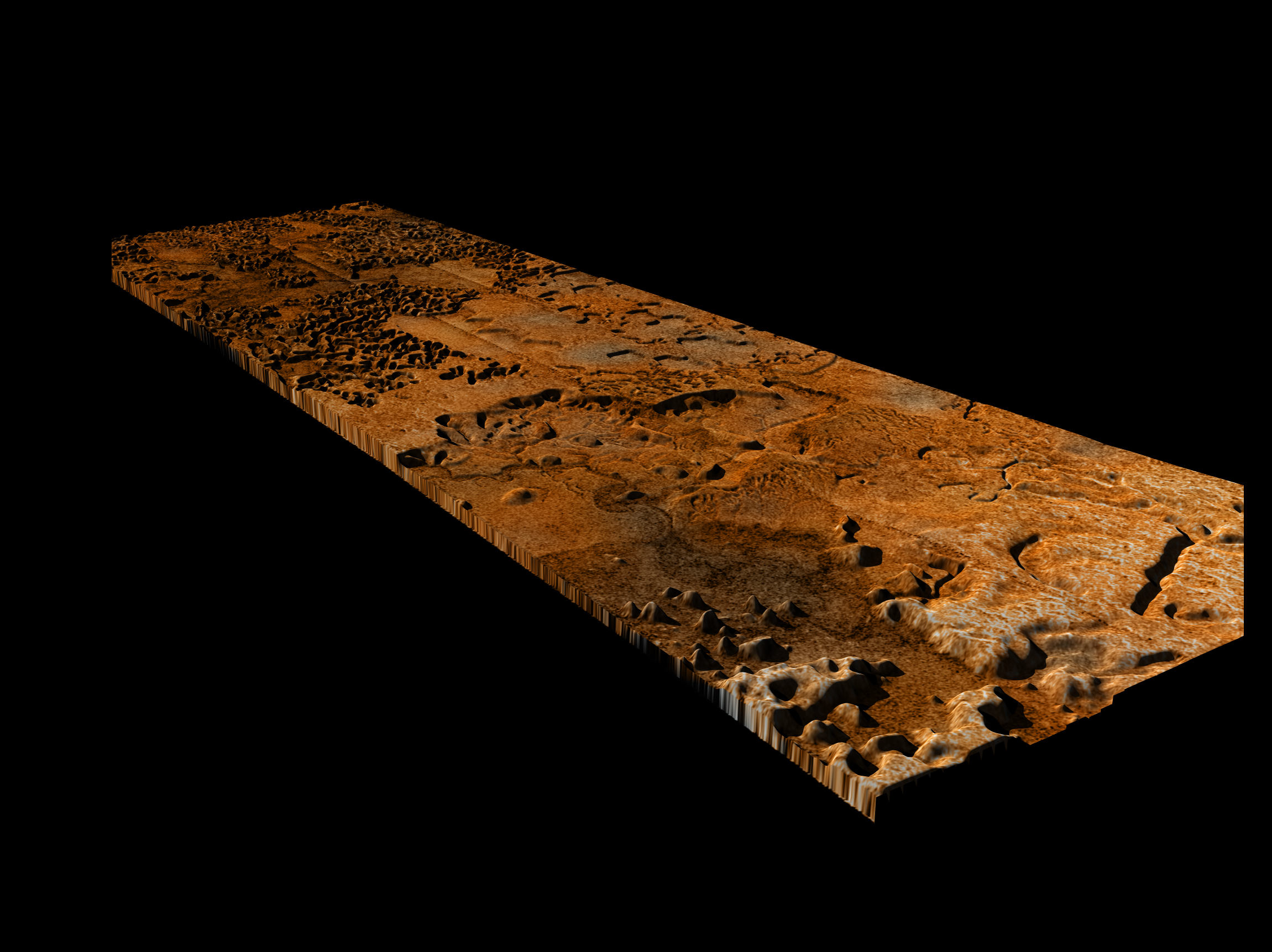
Artist's concept of Sikun Labyrinthus

Labyrinthi (complexes of intersecting valleys or ridges) on Titan are named after planets from the fictional Dune universe created by Frank Herbert.

Labyrinthus	Coordinates	Diameter (km)	Approval Date	Named after	Ref
Anbus Labyrinthus	39.2°N 215°W	120	1 March 2017	Anbus	WGPSN
Corrin Labyrinthus	66.0°S 31°W	280	14 September 2017	Corrin	WGPSN
Ecaz Labyrinthus	83.0°S 36.7°W	360	8 October 2014	Ecaz	WGPSN
Gammu Labyrinthus	77.9°S 250°W	115	8 March 2017	Gammu	WGPSN
Gamont Labyrinthus	56.8°N 75°W	130	1 March 2017	Gamont	WGPSN
Gansireed Labyrinthus	69.3°S 239.3°W	300	8 March 2017	Gansireed	WGPSN
Ginaz Labyrinthus	83°N 261.7°W	160	1 March 2017	Ginaz	WGPSN
Grumann Labyrinthus	69.3°S 239.3°W	540	1 March 2017	Grumann	WGPSN
Harmonthep Labyrinthus	72.3°S 101.4°W	363	14 September 2017	Harmonthep	WGPSN
Ipyr Labyrinthus	86.24°N 289°W	76.97	14 December 2020	Ipyr	WGPSN
Junction Labyrinthus	47.7°S 215.3°W	484	1 March 2017	Junction	WGPSN
Kaitain Labyrinthus	52.37°N 348.66°W	196	8 October 2014	Kaitain	WGPSN
Kronin Labyrinthus	35.7°S 96.27°W	270	1 March 2017	Kronin	WGPSN
Lampadas Labyrinthus	81.8°S 124°W	445	8 March 2017	Lampadas	WGPSN
Lankiveil Labyrinthus	48.2°S 149.5°W	450	1 March 2017	Lankiveil	WGPSN
Lernaeus Labyrinthus	83.4°S 138°W	167	8 March 2017	Lernaeus	WGPSN
Muritan Labyrinthus	68.8°S 219.2°W	200	8 March 2017	Muritan	WGPSN
Naraj Labyrinthus	74.2°S 35.8°W	115	8 March 2017	Naraj	WGPSN
Niushe Labyrinthus	75.1°N 88.1°W	222	14 September 2017	Niushe	WGPSN
Palma Labyrinthus	72.4°S 31°W	69	8 March 2017	Palma	WGPSN
Richese Labyrinthus	41.8°N 199.0°W	200	8 October 2014	Richese	WGPSN
Salusa Labyrinthus	45.6°N 264.2°W	126	14 September 2017	Salusa	WGPSN
Sikun Labyrinthus	77.9°S 28.9°W	175	6 January 2010	Sikun	WGPSN
Tleilax Labyrinthus	48°S 16°W	207	1 March 2017	Tleilax	WGPSN
Tupile Labyrinthus	80.5°S 32.2°W	84	20 July 2015	Tupile	WGPSN

== Lacunae ==
Lacunae are dark areas with the appearance of dry lake beds, which are named after intermittent lakes on Earth.

Lacunae	Coordinates	Length (km)	Approval Date	Named after	Ref
Atacama Lacuna	68.2°N 227.6°W	35.9	21 December 2010	Salar de Atacama, intermittent lake in Chile	WGPSN
Cerknica Lacuna	71.12°N 175.56°W	96	13 April 2022	Intermittent lake in Slovenia	WGPSN
Eyre Lacuna	72.6°N 225.1°W	25.4	21 December 2010	Lake Eyre, an intermittent lake in Australia	WGPSN
Jerid Lacuna	66.7°N 221°W	42.6	21 December 2010	Chott el Djerid, intermittent lake in Tunisia	WGPSN
Kutch Lacuna	88.4°N 217°W	175	3 December 2013	Great Rann of Kutch, intermittent lake on Pakistani-Indian border	WGPSN
Melrhir Lacuna	64.9°N 212.6°W	23	21 December 2010	Chott Melrhir, intermittent lake in Algeria	WGPSN
Nakuru Lacuna	65.81°N 94°W	188	3 December 2013	Lake Nakuru, intermittent lake in Kenya	WGPSN
Ngami Lacuna	66.7°N 213.9°W	37.2	21 December 2010	Lake Ngami, in Botswana, and like its terrestrial namesake is considered to be endorheic.	WGPSN
Orog Lacuna	70.85°N 172.06°W	42	13 April 2022	Intermittent lake in Mongolia	WGPSN
Racetrack Lacuna	66.1°N 224.9°W	9.9	21 December 2010	Racetrack Playa, intermittent lake in California, USA	WGPSN
Uyuni Lacuna	66.3°N 228.4°W	27	21 December 2010	Salar de Uyuni, intermittent lake and world's largest salt flat in Bolivia	WGPSN
Veliko Lacuna	76.8°S 33.1°W	93	20 July 2015	Veliko Lake, intermittent lake in Bosnia-Herzegovina	WGPSN
Woytchugga Lacuna	68.88°N 109.0°W	449	3 December 2013	Indications are that it is an intermittent lake and so was named in 2013 after Lake Woytchugga near Wilcannia, Australia.	WGPSN

== Lacūs ==
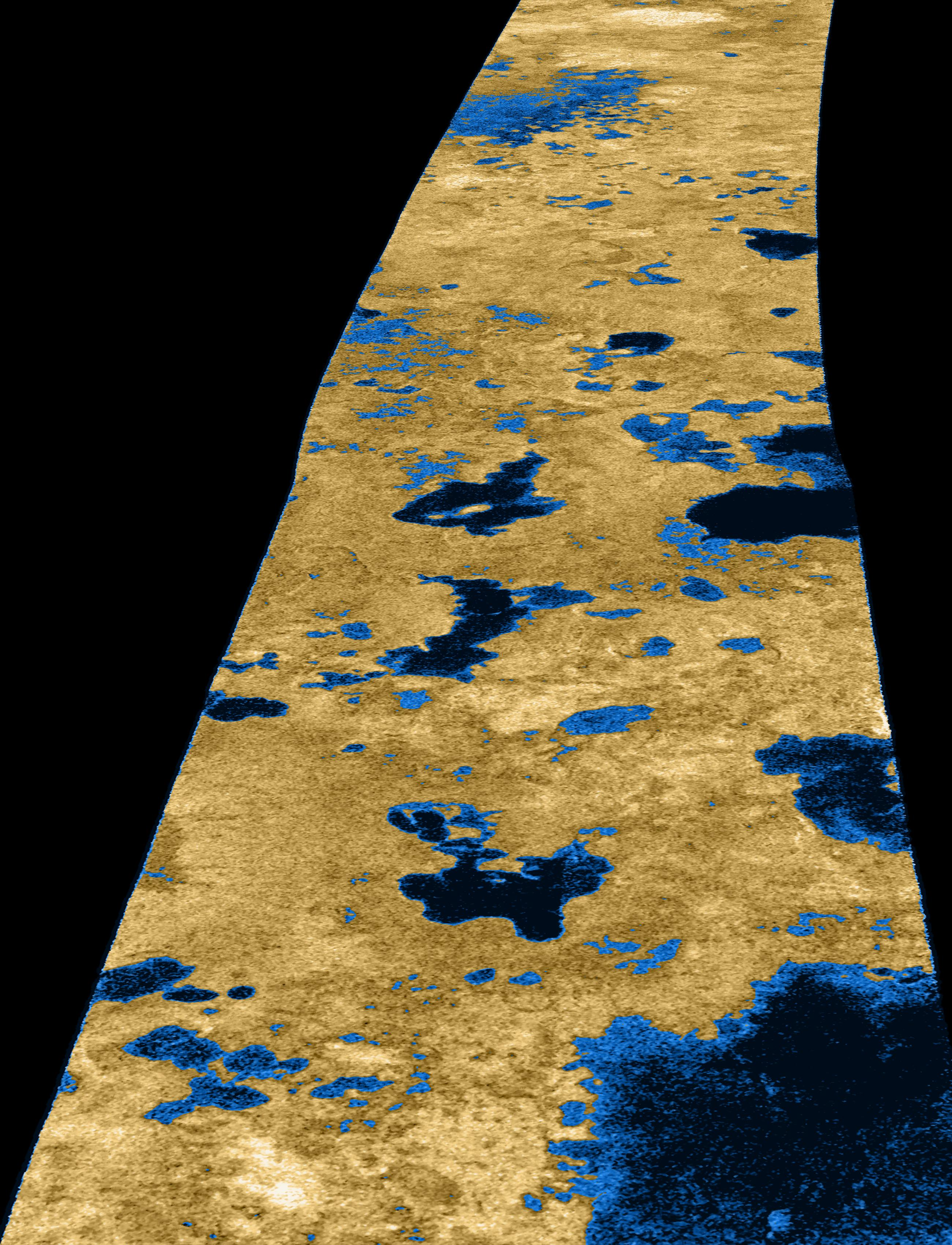
Lakes of liquid methane on Titan. View from Bolsena Lacus (lower right) to Mackay Lacus (upper left).

Lacūs (plural form of lacus used in Titan geological nomenclature) are hydrocarbon lakes.

== Large ringed features ==
Large ring features are named after deities of wisdom in world mythology.

Ring feature	Coordinates	Diameter (km)	Approval Date	Named after	Ref
Guabonito	10.9°S 150.8°W	55	2006	Guabonito, Taíno sea goddess	WGPSN
Nath	30.5°S 7.7°W	95	2006	Irish goddess of wisdom	WGPSN
Paxsi	5.0°N 341.2°W	120	15 October 2010	Aymara goddess of the moon and wisdom	WGPSN
Veles	2.0°N 137.3°W	45	2006	Veles, Slavic god	WGPSN

== Maculae ==
Titanean maculae (dark spots) are named after deities of happiness, peace, and harmony in world mythology.

Macula	Coordinates	Diameter (km)	Approval Date	Named after	Ref
Eir Macula	24.0°S 114.7°W	145	2006	Eir, Norse goddess.	WGPSN
Elpis Macula	31.2°N 27.0°W	500	2006	Elpis, Greek god	WGPSN
Ganesa Macula	50.0°N 87.3°W	160	2006	Ganesa, Hindu god	WGPSN
Genetaska Macula	23.5°N 196.3°W	24	20 July 2015	Genetaska, Peace Queen of the Iroquois	WGPSN
Omacatl Macula	17.6°N 37.2°W	225	2006	Omacatl, Aztec god.	WGPSN
Polaznik Macula	41.1°S 280.4°W	346.90	5 April 2010	Polaznik, Slavic god	WGPSN
Polelya Macula	50.0°N 56.0°W	175	2 March 2007	Polelya, Slavic god	WGPSN

== Maria ==
Maria (plural of mare) are hydrocarbon seas.

== Montes ==
Mountains are named after mountains from the fictional Middle-Earth created by J.R.R. Tolkien.

Mons	Coordinates	Diameter (km)	Approval Date	Named after	Ref
Angmar Montes	10.0°S 221.0°W	230	5 December 2011	Mountains of Angmar	WGPSN
Dolmed Montes	11.6°S 216.8°W	400	5 December 2011	Mount Dolmed	WGPSN
Doom Mons	14.65°S 40.42°W	63	13 November 2012	Mount Doom	WGPSN
Echoriat Montes	7.4°S 213.8°W	930	5 December 2011	Echoriath	WGPSN
Erebor Mons	4.97°S 36.23°W	50	13 November 2012	Erebor, the Lonely Mountain	WGPSN
Gram Montes	9.9°S 207.9°W	260	5 December 2011	Mount Gram	WGPSN
Irensaga Montes	5.68°S 212.71°W	194	13 November 2012	Irensaga	WGPSN
Lithui Montes	84.68°N 112.56°W	200	14 December 2020	Ered Lithui, also called Ash Mountains	WGPSN
Luin Montes	81.98°N 36.26°W	156	13 April 2022	Ered Luin, also called Blue Mountains	WGPSN
Merlock Montes	8.9°S 211.8°W	200	5 December 2011	Merlock Mountains	WGPSN
Mindolluin Montes	3.3°S 208.96°W	340	13 November 2012	Mindolluin	WGPSN
Misty Montes	56.8°N 62.44°W	73	13 November 2012	Misty Mountains	WGPSN
Mithrim Montes	2.16°S 127.42°W	147	13 November 2012	Mountains of Mithrim	WGPSN
Moria Montes	15.1°N 190.5°W	107	20 July 2015	Mountains of Moria	WGPSN
Rerir Montes	4.8°S 212.1°W	370	5 December 2011	Mount Rerir	WGPSN
Taniquetil Montes	3.67°S 213.26°W	130	13 November 2012	Taniquetil	WGPSN

== Paterae ==
Paterae are caldera or deep-wall craters with a possible volcanic origin. Sotra Patera was formerly named Sotra Facula, which followed the naming theme for Faculae. No nomenclature currently exists for this class of features on Titan.

Patera	Coordinates	Diameter (km)	Approval Date	Named after	Ref
Sotra Patera	12.5°S 39.8°W	40	19 December 2012	Sotra, Norwegian island	WGPSN

== Planitiae ==
Planitiae (low plains) on Titan are named after planets from the fictional Dune universe created by Frank Herbert.

Planitia	Coordinates	Diameter (km)	Approval Date	Named after	Ref
Arrakis Planitia	78.4°S 117.0°W	337.40	5 April 2010	Arrakis	WGPSN
Buzzell Planitia	66.3°S 262.7°W	870	18 March 2016	Buzzell	WGPSN
Caladan Planitia	31.0°N 226.0°W	2800	8 October 2014	Caladan	WGPSN
Chusuk Planitia	5.0°S 23.5°W	125	4 August 2009	Chusuk	WGPSN
Giedi Planitia	5.22°N 357.02°W	303.25	24 August 2017	Giedi	WGPSN
Hagal Planitia	60.6°S 345.0°W	435	27 December 2015	Hagal	WGPSN
Poritrin Planitia	48.0°N 24.0°W	1900	8 October 2014	Poritrin	WGPSN
Romo Planitia	82.8°S 201.0°W	400	27 December 2015	Romo	WGPSN
Rossak Planitia	71.0°S 355°W	512	27 December 2015	Rossak	WGPSN
Xuttah Planitia	10.60°N 167.69°W	18	13 April 2022	Xuttah	WGPSN

== Regiones ==
Regiones (regions distinctly different from their surroundings) are named after deities of peace and happiness.

Regio	Coordinates	Diameter (km)	Approval Date	Named after	Ref
Concordia Regio	20.0°S 241.0°W	1500	5 January 2012	Concordia, the Roman goddess of divinity and harmony	WGPSN
Hetpet Regio	22.0°S 292.0°W	1080	5 January 2012	Hetpet, the Egyptian personification of happiness	WGPSN
Hotei Regio	26.0°S 78.0°W	500	7 May 2009	Budai, Chinese/Japanese god	WGPSN
Ochumare Regio	10.4°N 348.1°W	939	14 September 2017	Ochumare, Puertan Rican goddess of happiness and weather	WGPSN
Tui Regio	24.5°S 124.9°W	1200	2006	Tui, Chinese goddess.	WGPSN

== Sinūs ==
Sinus (bays) within seas or lakes are named after terrestrial bays, coves, fjords or inlets.

Name	Coordinates	Liquid body	Length (km)	Approval Date	Source of name	Ref
Arnar Sinus	72.6°N 322°W	Kraken Mare	101	19 January 2015	Arnar, fjord in Iceland	WGPSN
Avacha Sinus	82.87°N 335.43°W	Punga Mare	51	12 March 2020	Avacha Bay in Kamchatka, Russia	WGPSN
Baffin Sinus	80.35°N 344.62°W	Kraken Mare	110	9 January 2018	Baffin Bay between Canada and Greenland	WGPSN
Boni Sinus	78.69°N 345.38°W	Kraken Mare	54	9 January 2018	Gulf of Boni in Indonesia	WGPSN
Dingle Sinus	81.36°N 336.44°W	Kraken Mare	80	9 January 2018	Dingle Bay in Ireland	WGPSN
Fagaloa Sinus	82.9°N 320.5°W	Punga Mare	33	14 December 2020	Fagaloa Bay in Upolu Island, Samoa	WGPSN
Flensborg Sinus	64.9°N 295.3°W	Kraken Mare	115	19 January 2015	Flensburg Firth, fjord between Denmark and Germany	WGPSN
Fundy Sinus	83.26°N 315.64°W	Punga Mare	91	12 March 2020	Bay of Fundy in Canada that hosts the world's largest tides	WGPSN
Gabes Sinus	67.6°N 289.6°W	Kraken Mare	147	19 January 2015	Gabes, or Syrtis minor, a bay in Tunisia	WGPSN
Genova Sinus	80.11°N 326.61°W	Kraken Mare	125	9 January 2018	Gulf of Genoa in Italy	WGPSN
Kumbaru Sinus	56.8°N 303.8°W	Kraken Mare	122	19 January 2015	Bay in India	WGPSN
Lulworth Sinus	67.19°N 316.88°W	Kraken Mare	24	12 March 2020	Lulworth Cove in southern England	WGPSN
Maizuru Sinus	78.9°N 352.53°W	Kraken Mare	92	9 January 2018	Maizuru Bay in Japan	WGPSN
Manza Sinus	79.29°N 346.1°W	Kraken Mare	37	9 January 2018	Manza Bay in Tanzania	WGPSN
Montego Sinus	80.76°N 130.92°W		83	13 April 2022	Montego Bay in Jamaica	WGPSN
Moray Sinus	76.6°N 281.4°W	Kraken Mare	204	19 January 2015	Moray Firth in Scotland	WGPSN
Nicoya Sinus	74.8°N 251.2°W	Ligeia Mare	130	19 January 2015	Gulf of Nicoya in Costa Rica	WGPSN
Okahu Sinus	73.7°N 282°W	Kraken Mare	141	19 January 2015	Okahu Bay near Auckland, New Zealand	WGPSN
Patos Sinus	77.2°N 224.8°W	Ligeia Mare	103	19 January 2015	Patos, fjord in Chile	WGPSN
Puget Sinus	82.4°N 241.1°W	Ligeia Mare	93	19 January 2015	Puget Sound in Washington, United States	WGPSN
Rombaken Sinus	75.3°N 232.9°W	Ligeia Mare	92.5	19 January 2015	Rombaken, fjord in Norway	WGPSN
Saldanha Sinus	82.42°N 322.5°W	Punga Mare	18	14 December 2020	Saldanha Bay in South Africa	WGPSN
Skelton Sinus	76.8°N 314.9°W	Kraken Mare	73	19 January 2015	Skelton Glacier near Ross Sea, Antarctica	WGPSN
Trold Sinus	71.3°N 292.7°W	Kraken Mare	118	19 January 2015	Trold Fiord Formation in Nunavut, Canada	WGPSN
Tumaco Sinus	82.55°N 315.22°W	Punga Mare	31	14 December 2020	Tumaco, port city and bay in Colombia	WGPSN
Tunu Sinus	79.2°N 299.8°W	Kraken Mare	134	19 January 2015	Tunu, fjord in Greenland	WGPSN
Wakasa Sinus	80.7°N 270°W	Ligeia Mare	146	19 January 2015	Wakasa Bay in Japan	WGPSN
Walvis Sinus	58.2°N 324.1°W	Kraken Mare	253	19 January 2015	Walvis Bay in Namibia	WGPSN

== Terrae ==
Terrae are extensive landmasses. As with the albedo features, they are named after sacred and enchanted locations from cultures across the world.

Terra	Coordinates	Diameter (km)	Approval Date	Named after	Ref
Garotman Terra	13.5°S 348.0°W	970	5 January 2012	Garotman, the Iranian paradise that the souls of faithful men inhabit	WGPSN
Paititi Terra	20.22°N 249.39°W	2100	12 July 2024	Paititi, Incan legendary lost city east of the Andes	WGPSN
Tollan Terra	6.4°N 322.7°W	800	5 January 2012	Tollan, the Aztec paradise where crops never wilt	WGPSN
Tsiipiya Terra	2.83°N 340.12°W	573.24	24 August 2017	Tsiipiya, the Hopi name for Mount Taylor in New Mexico, USA	WGPSN
Yalaing Terra	19.5°S 324.0°W	980	5 January 2012	Yalaing, the Australian spirit land for good souls with clean water and game	WGPSN

== Undae ==
Undae are dune fields. On Titan they are named after deities of wind.

Undae	Coordinates	Diameter (km)	Approval Date	Named after	Ref
Ahmakiq Undae	2.22°N 202.7°W	812	13 April 2026	Ahmakiq, Mayan deity who locks up the crop-destroying winds.	WGPSN
Aura Undae	13.79°N 226.86°W	490	20 July 2015	Aura, goddess of the morning wind.	WGPSN
Boreas Undae	6°S 215°W	260	5 December 2011	Boreas, Greek god of the north wind.	WGPSN
Eurus Undae	7.5°S 210.3°W	220	5 December 2011	Eurus, Greek personification of the east wind.	WGPSN
Notus Undae	10°S 211.1°W	530	5 December 2011	Notus, Greek god of the south or southwest wind.	WGPSN
Zephyrus Undae	8.5°S 217.1°W	130	5 December 2011	Zephyrus, Greek personification of the gentle west wind.	WGPSN

== Virgae ==
Virgae (streaks of colour) are named after rain gods in world mythologies.

Virga	Coordinates	Diameter (km)	Approval Date	Named after	Ref
Bacab Virgae	19.0°S 151.0°W	485	2006	Bacab, Mayan rain god	WGPSN
Hobal Virga	35.0°S 166.0°W	1075	2006	Hobal, Arabian rain god.	WGPSN
Kalseru Virga	36.0°S 137.0°W	630	2006	Kalseru, Australian Aborigine rain god.	WGPSN
Perkunas Virgae	27.0°S 162.0°W	980	2006	Perkūnas, Lithuanian supreme god	WGPSN
Shiwanni Virgae	25.0°S 32.0°W	1400	2006	Shiwanni, Zuni rain god	WGPSN
Tishtrya Virgae	23.8°N 179.8°W	276	20 July 2015	Tishtrya, Persian rain god	WGPSN
Tlaloc Virgae	23.7°N 207.7°W	600	20 July 2015	Tlaloc, Aztec rain god	WGPSN
Uanui Virgae	45.2°N 235.3°W	917	5 April 2010	Uanui, Māori rain god	WGPSN

== Informal names for previously unnamed features ==
Because the exact nature of many surface features remain mysterious, a number of features took time to receive formal names and are known by nicknames. In most cases, indications of brightness and darkness refer not to visible light, but to the infrared images used to look through Titan's obscuring haze.

- 'The Sickle': a large, dark, sickle-shaped region identified by the Hubble Space Telescope.
- 'Throat of Kraken': unofficial name for the strait that separates the north and south basins of Kraken Mare, before officially being named Seldon Fretum. It was used in early publications that hypothesized about its role with tidal dissipation and surface currents between the two basins of Kraken Mare.

== See also ==
- Lakes of Titan
