= Geology of Titan =

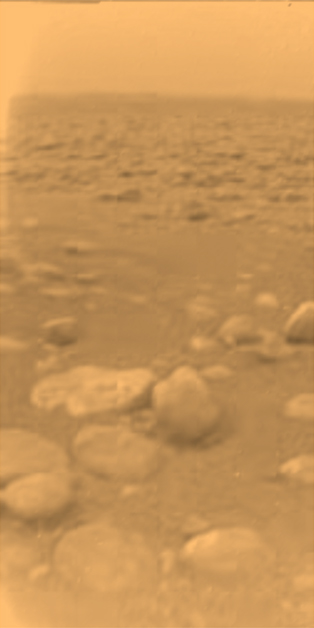
An image of Titan's surface from the Huygens lander. Titan is the only object in the outer Solar System where a spacecraft has landed and conducted surface operations.

The geology of Titan, the largest moon of Saturn, is inferred from observations: Titan's density of 1.881 g/cm^{3} indicates that it is roughly 40–60% rock by mass, with the rest being water ice and other materials. It is differentiated into a rocky core, liquid water ocean, and an icy shell; the core and ocean may be partitioned by a layer of exotic high-pressure ices, and the icy shell may have a chemically distinct surface crust.

== Surface features ==
=== Surface liquid ===
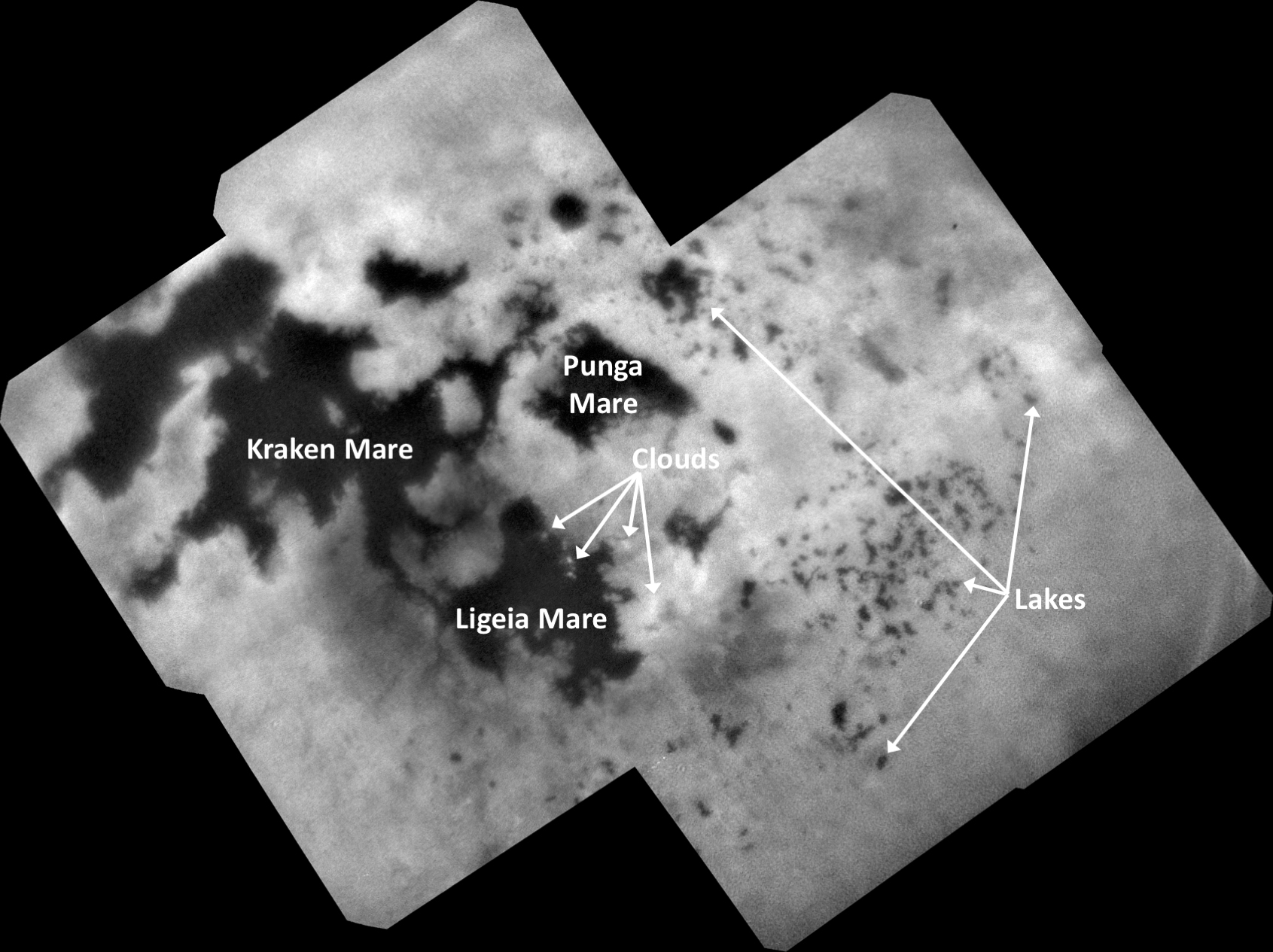
A labeled map of Titan's northern hydrocarbon lakes. The lakes are filled with liquid ethane, methane, and dissolved N_{2}. (11 September 2017)

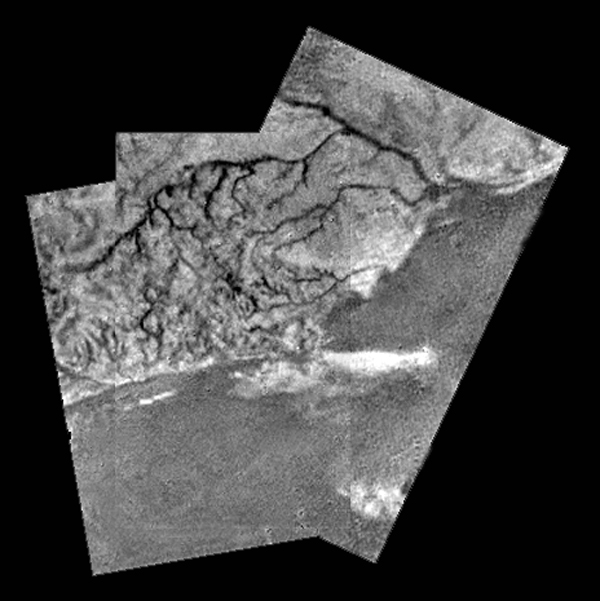
Mosaic of three Huygens images of channel system on Titan

The possibility of hydrocarbon seas on Titan was first suggested based on Voyager 1 and 2 data that showed Titan to have a thick atmosphere of approximately the correct temperature and composition to support them, but direct evidence was not obtained until 1995 when data from Hubble and other observations suggested the existence of liquid methane on Titan, either in disconnected pockets or on the scale of satellite-wide oceans, similar to water on Earth.

The Cassini mission confirmed the former hypothesis. When the probe arrived in the Saturnian system in 2004, it was hoped that hydrocarbon lakes or oceans would be detected from the sunlight reflected off their surface, but no specular reflections were initially observed. Near Titan's south pole, an enigmatic dark feature named Ontario Lacus was identified (and later confirmed to be a lake). A possible shoreline was also identified near the pole via radar imagery. Following a flyby on 22 July 2006, in which the Cassini spacecraft's radar imaged the northern latitudes (that were then in winter), several large, smooth (and thus dark to radar) patches were seen dotting the surface near the pole. Based on the observations, scientists announced "definitive evidence of lakes filled with methane on Saturn's moon Titan" in January 2007. The Cassini–Huygens team concluded that the imaged features are almost certainly the long-sought hydrocarbon lakes, the first stable bodies of surface liquid found outside Earth. Some appear to have channels associated with liquid and lie in topographical depressions. The liquid erosion features appear to be a very recent occurrence: channels in some regions have created surprisingly little erosion, suggesting erosion on Titan is extremely slow, or some other recent phenomena may have wiped out older riverbeds and landforms. Overall, the Cassini radar observations have shown that lakes cover only a small percentage of the surface, making Titan much drier than Earth. Most of the lakes are concentrated near the poles (where the relative lack of sunlight prevents evaporation), but several long-standing hydrocarbon lakes in the equatorial desert regions have also been discovered, including one near the Huygens landing site in the Shangri-La region, which is about half the size of the Great Salt Lake in Utah, USA. The equatorial lakes are probably "oases", i.e. the likely supplier is underground aquifers.

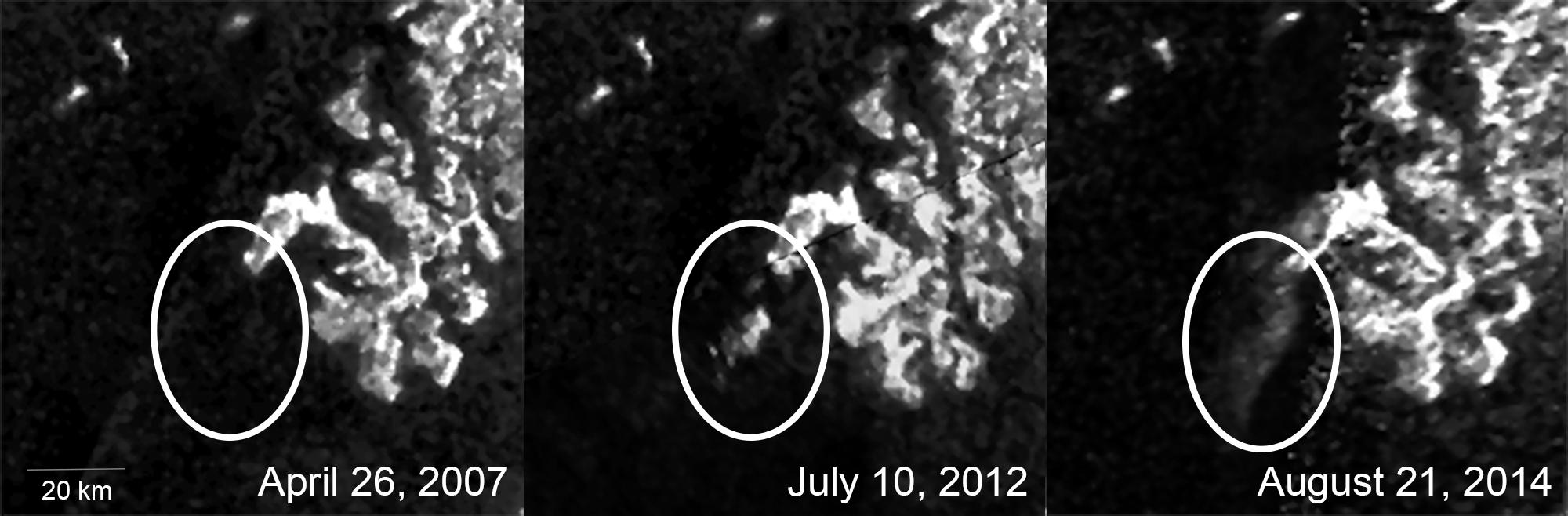
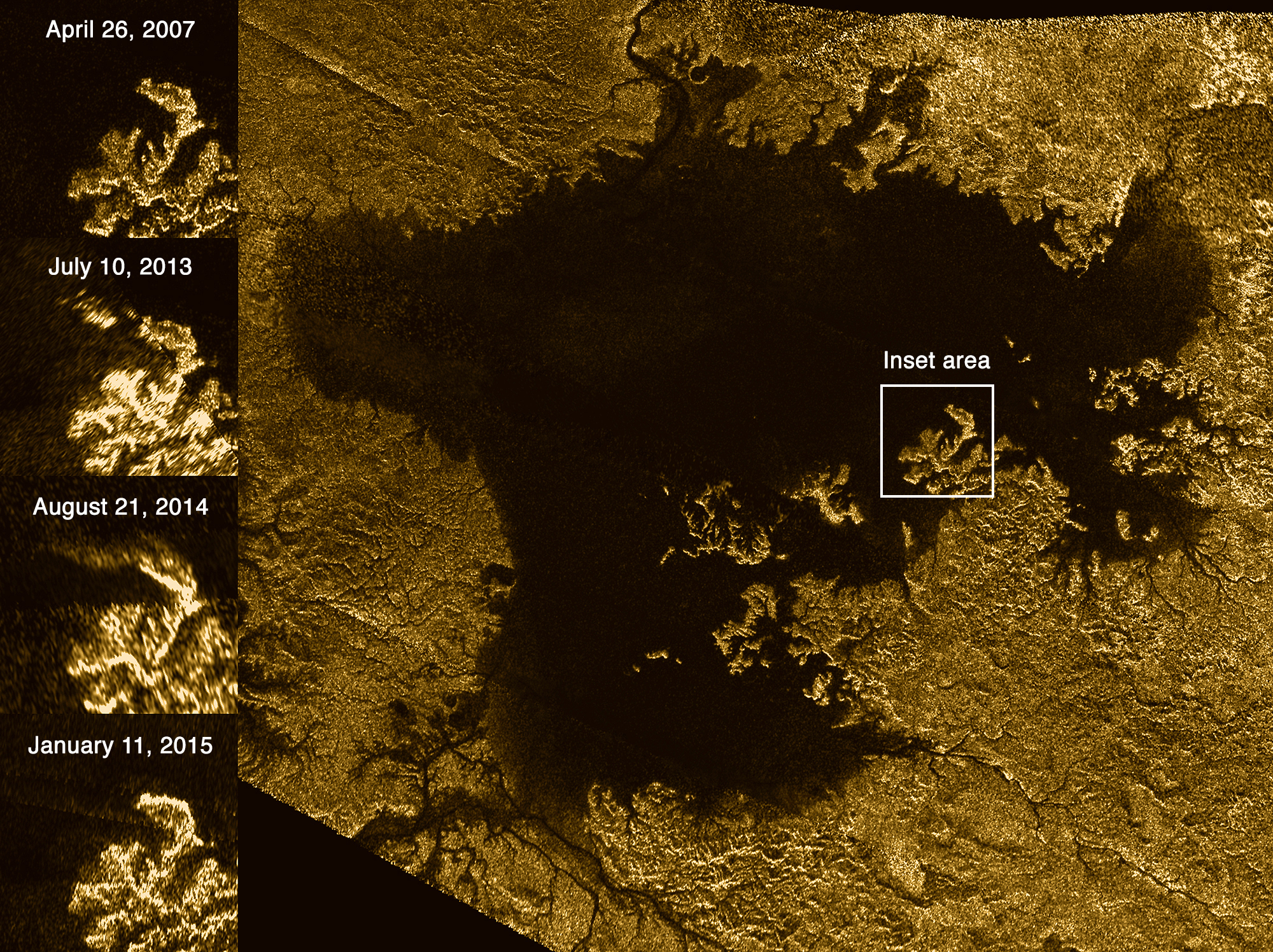
Evolving feature in Ligeia Mare

In June 2008, the Visual and Infrared Mapping Spectrometer on Cassini confirmed the presence of liquid ethane beyond doubt in Ontario Lacus. On 21 December 2008, Cassini passed directly over Ontario Lacus and observed specular reflection in radar. The strength of the reflection saturated the probe's receiver, indicating that the lake level did not vary by more than 3 mm (implying either that surface winds were minimal, or the lake's hydrocarbon fluid is viscous).

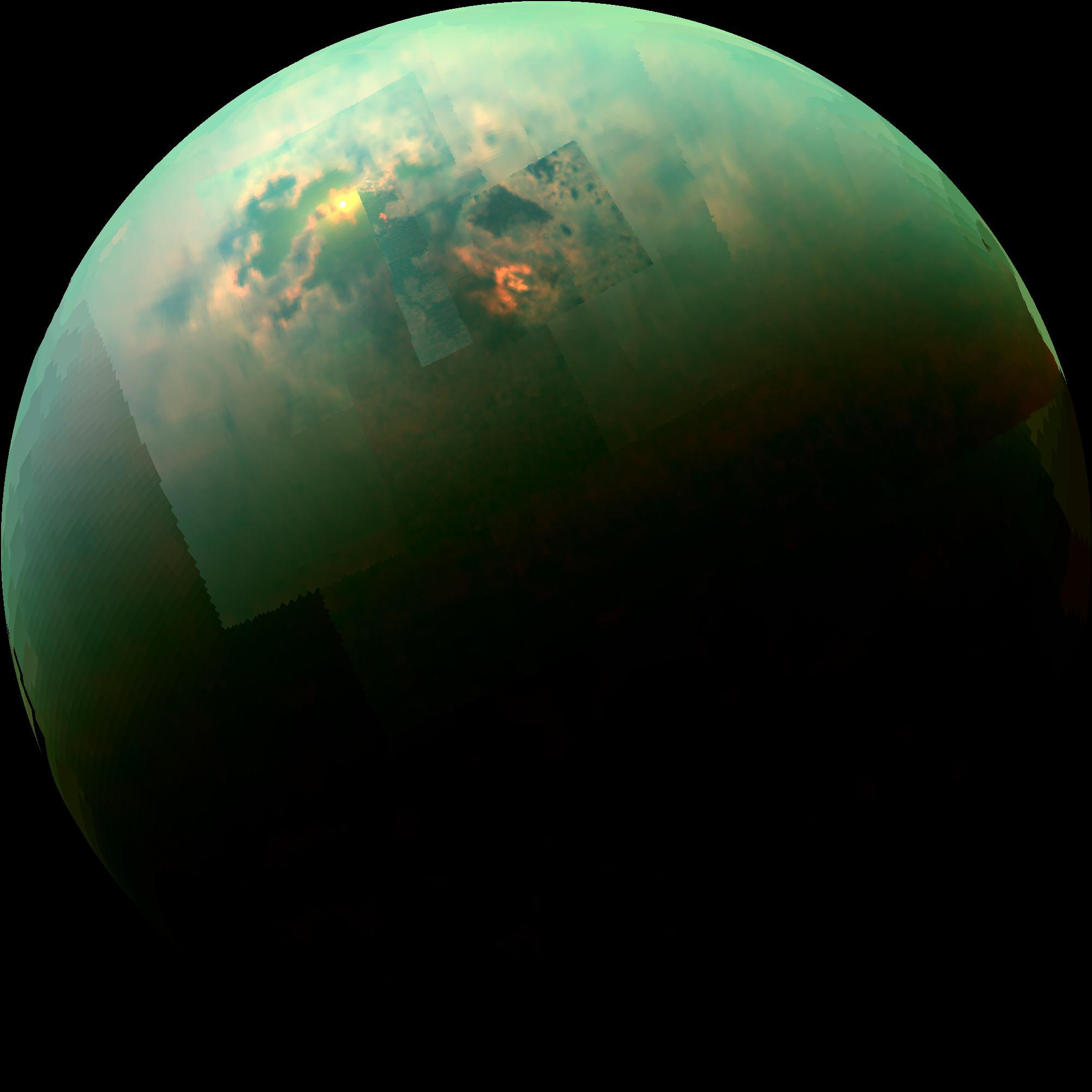
Near-infrared radiation from the Sun reflecting off Titan's hydrocarbon seas

On 8 July 2009, Cassini's VIMS observed a specular reflection indicative of a smooth, mirror-like surface, off what today is called Jingpo Lacus, a lake in the north polar region shortly after the area emerged from 15 years of winter darkness. Specular reflections are indicative of a smooth, mirror-like surface, so the observation corroborated the inference of the presence of a large liquid body drawn from radar imaging.

Early radar measurements made in July 2009 and January 2010 indicated that Ontario Lacus was extremely shallow, with an average depth of 0.4–3 m, and a maximum depth of 3 to 7 m (9.8 to 23.0 ft). In contrast, the northern hemisphere's Ligeia Mare was initially mapped to depths exceeding 8 m, the maximum discernable by the radar instrument and the analysis techniques of the time. Later science analysis, released in 2014, more fully mapped the depths of Titan's three methane seas and showed depths of more than 200 metres (660 ft). Ligeia Mare averages from 20 to 40 m (66 to 131 ft) in depth, while other parts of Ligeia did not register any radar reflection at all, indicating a depth of more than 200 m (660 ft). While only the second largest of Titan's methane seas, Ligeia "contains enough liquid methane to fill three Lake Michigans".

In May 2013, Cassini's radar altimeter observed Titan's Vid Flumina channels, defined as a drainage network connected to Titan's second-largest hydrocarbon sea, Ligeia Mare. Analysis of the received altimeter echoes showed that the channels are located in deep (up to ~570 m), steep-sided, canyons and have strong specular surface reflections that indicate they are currently filled with liquid. Elevations of the liquid in these channels are at the same level as Ligeia Mare to within a vertical precision of about 0.7 m, consistent with the interpretation of drowned river valleys. Specular reflections are also observed in lower order tributaries elevated above the level of Ligeia Mare, consistent with drainage feeding into the main channel system. This is likely the first direct evidence of the presence of liquid channels on Titan and the first observation of hundred-meter deep canyons on Titan. Vid Flumina canyons are thus drowned by the sea but there are a few isolated observations to attest to the presence of surface liquids standing at higher elevations.

During six flybys of Titan from 2006 to 2011, Cassini gathered radiometric tracking and optical navigation data from which investigators could roughly infer Titan's changing shape. The density of Titan is consistent with a body that is about 60% rock and 40% water. The team's analyzes suggest that Titan's surface can rise and fall by up to 10 metres during each orbit. That degree of warping suggests that Titan's interior is relatively deformable, and that the most likely model of Titan is one in which an icy shell dozens of kilometers thick floats atop a global ocean. The team's findings, together with the results of previous studies, hint that Titan's ocean may lie no more than 100 kilometres (62 mi) below its surface. On 2 July 2014, NASA reported the ocean inside Titan may be as salty as the Dead Sea. On 3 September 2014, NASA reported studies suggesting methane rainfall on Titan may interact with a layer of icy materials underground, called an "alkanofer", to produce ethane and propane that may eventually feed into rivers and lakes.

In 2016, Cassini found the first evidence of fluid-filled channels on Titan, in a series of deep, steep-sided canyons flowing into Ligeia Mare. This network of canyons, dubbed Vid Flumina, ranges in depth from 240 to 570 m and has sides as steep as 40°. They are believed to have formed either by crustal uplifting, like Earth's Grand Canyon, a lowering of sea level, or perhaps a combination of the two. The depth of erosion suggests that liquid flows in this part of Titan are long-term features that persist for thousands of years.

A 2025 study of Cassini's Radar images of Titan concluded that only 1.3% of the large rivers on Titan that end at coastlines have a river delta, compared to almost all rivers of similar size on Earth.

Photo of infrared specular reflection off Jingpo Lacus, a lake in the north polar region	Perspective radar view of Bolsena Lacus (lower right) and other northern hemisphere hydrocarbon lakes
Contrasting images of the number of lakes in Titan's northern hemisphere (left) and southern hemisphere (right)	Two images of Titan's southern hemisphere acquired one year apart, showing changes in south polar lakes

==== Insulae ====
Bermoothes, Bimini, Bralgu, Buyan, Hawaiki Insuale, Hufaidh Insulae, Krocylea Insulae, Mayda, Meropis, Onogoro, Penglai, Planctae Insulae, Royllo

=== Impact craters ===
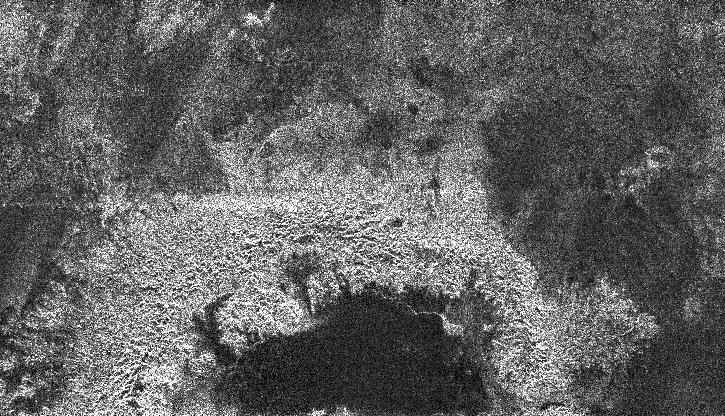
Radar image of a 139 km-diameter impact crater on Titan's surface, showing a smooth floor, rugged rim, and possibly a central peak.

Radar, SAR and imaging data from Cassini have revealed few impact craters on Titan's surface. These impacts appear to be relatively young, compared to Titan's age. The few impact craters discovered include a 392-kilometre-wide (244 mi) two-ring impact basin named Menrva seen by Cassini's ISS as a bright-dark concentric pattern. A smaller, 80-kilometre-wide (50 mi), flat-floored crater named Sinlap and a 30 km (19 mi) crater with a central peak and dark floor named Ksa have also been observed. Radar and Cassini imaging have also revealed "crateriforms", circular features on the surface of Titan that may be impact related, but lack certain features that would make identification certain. For example, a 90-kilometre-wide (56 mi) ring of bright, rough material known as Guabonito has been observed by Cassini. This feature is thought to be an impact crater filled in by dark, windblown sediment. Several other similar features have been observed in the dark Shangri-La and Aaru regions. Radar observed several circular features that may be craters in the bright region Xanadu during Cassini's 30 April 2006, flyby of Titan. Many of Titan's craters or probable craters display evidence of extensive erosion, and all show some indication of modification. Most large craters have breached or incomplete rims, despite the fact that some craters on Titan have relatively more massive rims than those anywhere else in the Solar System. There is little evidence of formation of palimpsests through viscoelastic crustal relaxation, unlike on other large icy moons. Most craters lack central peaks and have smooth floors, possibly due to impact-generation or later eruption of cryovolcanic lava. Infill from various geological processes is one reason for Titan's relative deficiency of craters; atmospheric shielding also plays a role. It is estimated that Titan's atmosphere reduces the number of craters on its surface by a factor of two.

The limited high-resolution radar coverage of Titan obtained through 2007 (22%) suggested the existence of nonuniformities in its crater distribution. Xanadu has 2–9 times more craters than elsewhere. The leading hemisphere has a 30% higher density than the trailing hemisphere. There are lower crater densities in areas of equatorial dunes and in the north polar region (where hydrocarbon lakes and seas are most common).

Pre-Cassini models of impact trajectories and angles suggest that where the impactor strikes the water ice crust, a small amount of ejecta remains as liquid water within the crater. It may persist as liquid for centuries or longer, sufficient for "the synthesis of simple precursor molecules to the origin of life".

=== Cryovolcanism and mountains ===
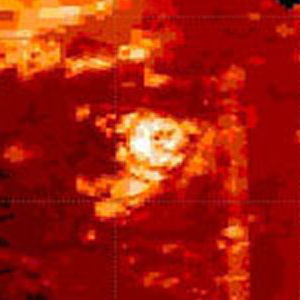
Near-infrared image of Tortola Facula, thought to be a possible cryovolcano

Scientists have long speculated that conditions on Titan resemble those of early Earth, though at a much lower temperature. The detection of argon-40 in the atmosphere in 2004 indicated that volcanoes had spawned plumes of "lava" composed of water and ammonia. Global maps of the lake distribution on Titan's surface revealed that there is not enough surface methane to account for its continued presence in its atmosphere, and thus that a significant portion must be added through volcanic processes.

Still, there is a paucity of surface features that can be unambiguously interpreted as cryovolcanoes. One of the first of such features revealed by Cassini radar observations in 2004, called Ganesa Macula, resembles the geographic features called "pancake domes" found on Venus, and was thus initially thought to be cryovolcanic in origin, until Kirk et al. refuted this hypothesis at the American Geophysical Union annual meeting in December 2008. The feature was found to be not a dome at all, but appeared to result from accidental combination of light and dark patches. In 2004 Cassini also detected an unusually bright feature (called Tortola Facula), which was interpreted as a cryovolcanic dome. No similar features have been identified as of 2010. In December 2008, astronomers announced the discovery of two transient but unusually long-lived "bright spots" in Titan's atmosphere, which appear too persistent to be explained by mere weather patterns, suggesting they were the result of extended cryovolcanic episodes.

A mountain range measuring 150 kilometres (93 mi) long, 30 kilometres (19 mi) wide and 1.5 kilometres (0.93 mi) high was also discovered by Cassini in 2006. This range lies in the southern hemisphere and is thought to be composed of icy material and covered in methane snow. The movement of tectonic plates, perhaps influenced by a nearby impact basin, could have opened a gap through which the mountain's material upweled. Prior to Cassini, scientists assumed that most of the topography on Titan would be impact structures, yet these findings reveal that similar to Earth, the mountains were formed through geological processes.

In 2008 Jeffrey Moore (planetary geologist of Ames Research Center) proposed an alternate view of Titan's geology. Noting that no volcanic features had been unambiguously identified on Titan so far, he asserted that Titan is a geologically dead world, whose surface is shaped only by impact cratering, fluvial and eolian erosion, mass wasting and other exogenic processes. According to this hypothesis, methane is not emitted by volcanoes but slowly diffuses out of Titan's cold and stiff interior. Ganesa Macula may be an eroded impact crater with a dark dune in the center. The mountainous ridges observed in some regions can be explained as heavily degraded scarps of large multi-ring impact structures or as a result of the global contraction due to the slow cooling of the interior. Even in this case, Titan may still have an internal ocean made of the eutectic water–ammonia mixture with a temperature of 176 K (−97 °C), which is low enough to be explained by the decay of radioactive elements in the core. The bright Xanadu terrain may be a degraded heavily cratered terrain similar to that observed on the surface of Callisto. Indeed, were it not for its lack of an atmosphere, Callisto could serve as a model for Titan's geology in this scenario. Jeffrey Moore even called Titan Callisto with weather.

In March 2009, structures resembling lava flows were announced in a region of Titan called Hotei Arcus, which appears to fluctuate in brightness over several months. Though many phenomena were suggested to explain this fluctuation, the lava flows were found to rise 200 metres (660 ft) above Titan's surface, consistent with it having erupted from beneath the surface.

In December 2010, the Cassini mission team announced the most compelling possible cryovolcano yet found. Named Sotra Patera, it is one in a chain of at least three mountains, each between 1000 and 1500 m in height, several of which are topped by large craters. The ground around their bases appears to be overlaid by frozen lava flows.

Crater-like landforms possibly formed via explosive, maar-like or caldera-forming cryovolcanic eruptions have been identified in Titan's polar regions. These formations are sometimes nested or overlapping and have features suggestive of explosions and collapses, such as elevated rims, halos, and internal hills or mountains. The polar location of these features and their colocalization with Titan's lakes and seas suggests volatiles such as methane may help power them. Some of these features appear quite fresh, suggesting that such volcanic activity continues to the present.

Most of Titan's highest peaks occur near its equator in so-called "ridge belts". They are believed to be analogous to Earth's fold mountains such as the Rockies or the Himalayas, formed by the collision and buckling of tectonic plates, or to subduction zones like the Andes, where upweling lava (or cryolava) from a melting descending plate rises to the surface. One possible mechanism for their formation is tidal forces from Saturn. Because Titan's icy mantle is less viscous than Earth's magma mantle, and because its icy bedrock is softer than Earth's granite bedrock, mountains are unlikely to reach heights as great as those on Earth. In 2016, the Cassini team announced what they believe to be the tallest mountain on Titan. Located in the Mithrim Montes range, it is 3,337 m tall.

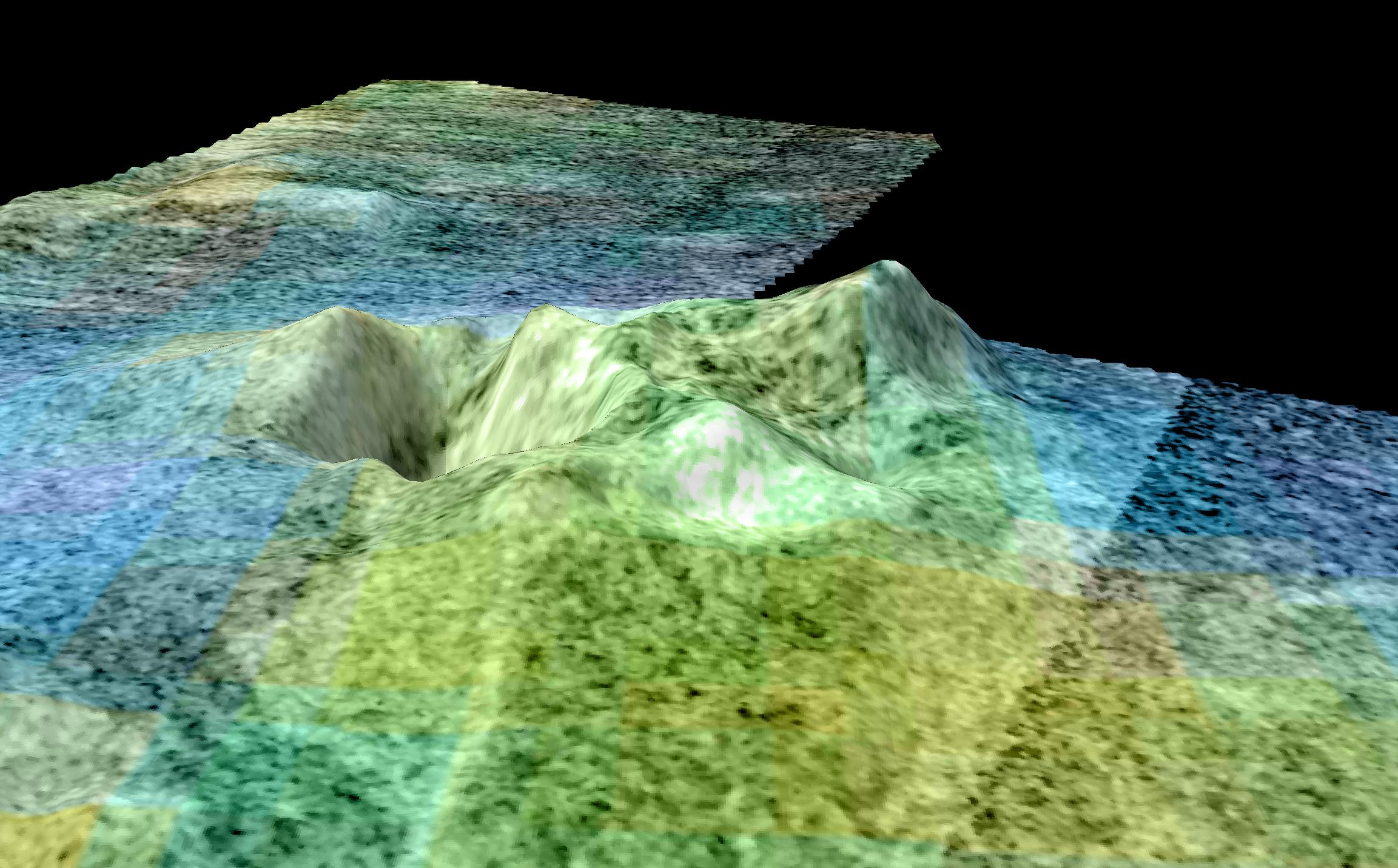
False-color VIMS image of the possible cryovolcano Sotra Patera, combined with a 3D map based on radar data, showing 1000-meter-high peaks and a 1500-meter-deep crater.

If volcanism on Titan really exists, the hypothesis is that it is driven by energy released from the decay of radioactive elements within the mantle, as it is on Earth. Magma on Earth is made of liquid rock, which is less dense than the solid rocky crust through which it erupts. Because ice is less dense than water, Titan's watery magma would be denser than its solid icy crust. This means that cryovolcanism on Titan would require a large amount of additional energy to operate, possibly via tidal flexing from nearby Saturn. The low-pressure ice, overlaying a liquid layer of ammonium sulfate, ascends buoyantly, and the unstable system can produce dramatic plume events. Titan is resurfaced through the process by grain-sized ice and ammonium sulfate ash, which helps produce a wind-shaped landscape and sand dune features. Titan may have been much more geologically active in the past; models of Titan's internal evolution suggest that Titan's crust was only 10 kilometers thick until about 500 million years ago, allowing vigorous cryovolcanism with low viscosity water magmas to erase all surface features formed before that time. Titan's modern geology would have formed only after the crust thickened to 50 kilometers and thus impeded constant cryovolcanic resurfacing, with any cryovolcanism occurring since that time producing much more viscous water magma with larger fractions of ammonia and methanol; this would also suggest that Titan's methane is no longer being actively added to its atmosphere and could be depleted entirely within a few tens of millions of years.

Many of the more prominent mountains and hills have been given official names by the International Astronomical Union. According to JPL, "By convention, mountains on Titan are named for mountains from Middle-earth, the fictional setting in fantasy novels by J. R. R. Tolkien." Colles (collections of hills) are named for characters from the same Tolkien works.

=== Dark equatorial terrain ===
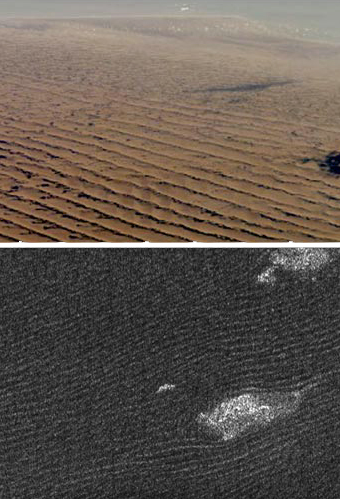
Sand dunes in the Namib Desert on Earth (top), compared with dunes in Belet on Titan

In the first images of Titan's surface taken by Earth-based telescopes in the early 2000s, large regions of dark terrain were revealed straddling Titan's equator. Prior to the arrival of Cassini, these regions were thought to be seas of liquid hydrocarbons. Radar images captured by the Cassini spacecraft have instead revealed some of these regions to be extensive plains covered in longitudinal dunes, up to 330 ft (100 m) high, about a kilometer wide, and tens to hundreds of kilometers long. Dunes of this type are always aligned with average wind direction. In the case of Titan, steady zonal (eastward) winds combine with variable tidal winds (approximately 0.5 meters per second). The tidal winds are the result of tidal forces from Saturn on Titan's atmosphere, which are 400 times stronger than the tidal forces of the Moon on Earth and tend to drive wind toward the equator. This wind pattern, it was hypothesized, causes granular material on the surface to gradually build up in long parallel dunes aligned west-to-east. The dunes break up around mountains, where the wind direction shifts.

The longitudinal (or linear) dunes were initially presumed to be formed by moderately variable winds that either follow one mean direction or alternate between two different directions. Subsequent observations indicate that the dunes point to the east although climate simulations indicate Titan's surface winds blow toward the west. At less than 1 meter per second, they are not powerful enough to lift and transport surface material. Recent computer simulations indicate that the dunes may be the result of rare storm winds that happen only every fifteen years when Titan is in equinox. These storms produce strong downdrafts, flowing eastward at up to 10 meters per second when they reach the surface.

The "sand" on Titan is likely not made up of small grains of silicates like the sand on Earth, but rather might have formed when liquid methane rained and eroded the water-ice bedrock, possibly in the form of flash floods. Alternatively, the sand could also have come from organic solids called tholins, produced by photochemical reactions in Titan's atmosphere. Studies of dunes' composition in May 2008 revealed that they possessed less water than the rest of Titan, and are thus most likely derived from organic soot like hydrocarbon polymers clumping together after raining onto the surface. Calculations indicate the sand on Titan has a density of one-third that of terrestrial sand. The low density combined with the dryness of Titan's atmosphere might cause the grains to clump together because of static electricity buildup. The "stickiness" might make it difficult for the generally mild breeze close to Titan's surface to move the dunes although more powerful winds from seasonal storms could still blow them eastward.

Around equinox, strong downburst winds can lift micron-sized solid organic particles up from the dunes to create Titanian dust storms, observed as intense and short-lived brightenings in the infrared.

Titan – three dust storms detected in 2009–2010.
