= Freta =

Freta may refer to:

- Freta Street (or ulica Freta), in Warsaw New Town, Poland
- Freta (Titan), plural of Fretum, channels found on Saturn's moon Titan
- Batterie de la Freta, fortification in France, part of the Ceintures de Lyon
