= Facula =

Facula (pl. faculae) is a bright spot on the surface of a planet or a star. It may refer to

- Solar facula
- Geology of Mercury § Faculae
- Bright spots on Ceres
- List of geological features on Titan § Faculae
- List of geological features on Callisto § Faculae
- List of geological features on Ganymede § Faculae
- Amalthea (moon) § Physical characteristics
