= Faramir Colles =

Faramir Colles is an area of small hills on Titan, the largest moon of the planet Saturn. The hills are located near Titan's equator at 4° north and 153° east within the Shangri-La region.

Faramir Colles is named after Faramir, a Gondorian prince in J. R. R. Tolkien's fictional world of Middle Earth who appears most prominently in The Lord of the Rings. The name follows a convention that Titanean colles (hills or small knobs) are named after characters in Tolkien's work. The name was formally announced on December 19, 2012.
