= Shikoku Facula =

Region of bright material on Titan

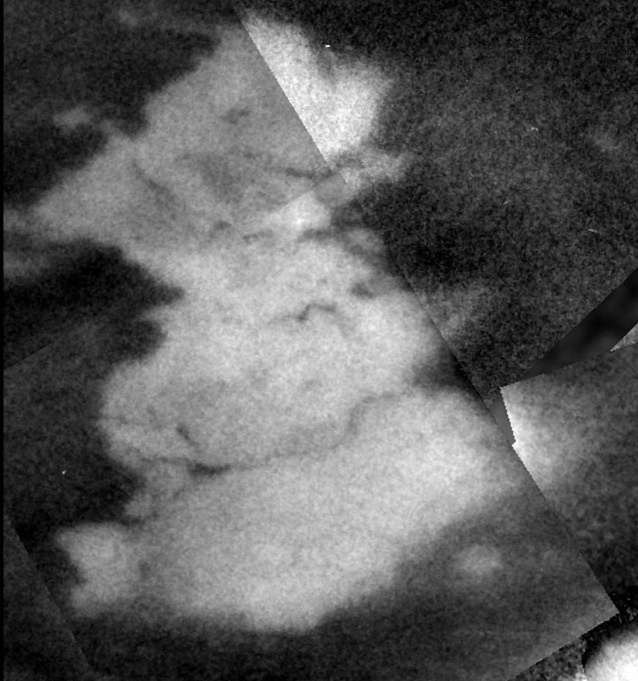
- Cassini view of Shikoku Facula
- Feature type: Facula
- Coordinates: 10.4°S 164.1°W
- Diameter: 200 km
- Eponym: Shikoku

Shikoku Facula is a region of bright material on Saturn's moon Titan.

Shikoku was first seen in Cassini images taken in October 2004 and has been observed several times since. Before it provisionally received an official name in August 2005, this feature was nicknamed "Great Britain" due to its shape. This feature, 200×160 kilometers across, is within Titan's Shangri-La dark region and is centered at 10.4°S 164.1°W. Images of Shikoku reveal a complex boundary between its margin and the dark terrain around it, and several dark channels terminating along the bright-dark boundary.

This feature was observed by the Cassini radar instrument's SAR imaging mode on April 30, 2006. This new view reveals variations in roughness across Shikoku, including a circular patch of smooth terrain 35 kilometers across in northeastern Shikoku that may be an impact crater. This circular feature, along with another region of relatively smooth terrain in southcentral Shikoku, do not appear to have a counterpart in the near-infrared images taken by the Imaging Science Subsystem cameras.

Shikoku Facula is named after Shikoku, the smallest of the four main Japanese islands.
