= Mezzoramia (Titan) =

Albedo feature on Titan

- Feature type: Dark albedo feature
- Coordinates: 70°S 0°W
- Eponym: Mezzoramia, Italian legend of oasis of happiness in Africa

Mezzoramia is a dark albedo feature (region) located at 70°S 0°W on Titan, the largest moon of the planet Saturn. It is named after Mezzoramia, a mythical African oasis of happiness from Italian legend.
