= Mezzoramia =

Mythical paradise in the African desert

- Genre: Myth

In-universe information
- Type: Oasis

Mezzoramia is a mythical paradise in the African desert, from a story by Simon Berington. Gaudentio di Lucca, the main character of the tale, discovers the secret, narrow road that provides the only access to the oasis, and resides there for twenty-five years.

In 2006, a dark albedo feature (region) of Saturn's moon Titan was named Mezzoramia after the mythical location.

== Bibliography ==
- The adventures of Signor Gaudentio di Lucca - Simon Berington - Ed. Cumming Dublin 1821.
