= Kraken Mare =

Largest hydrocarbon lake on Titan

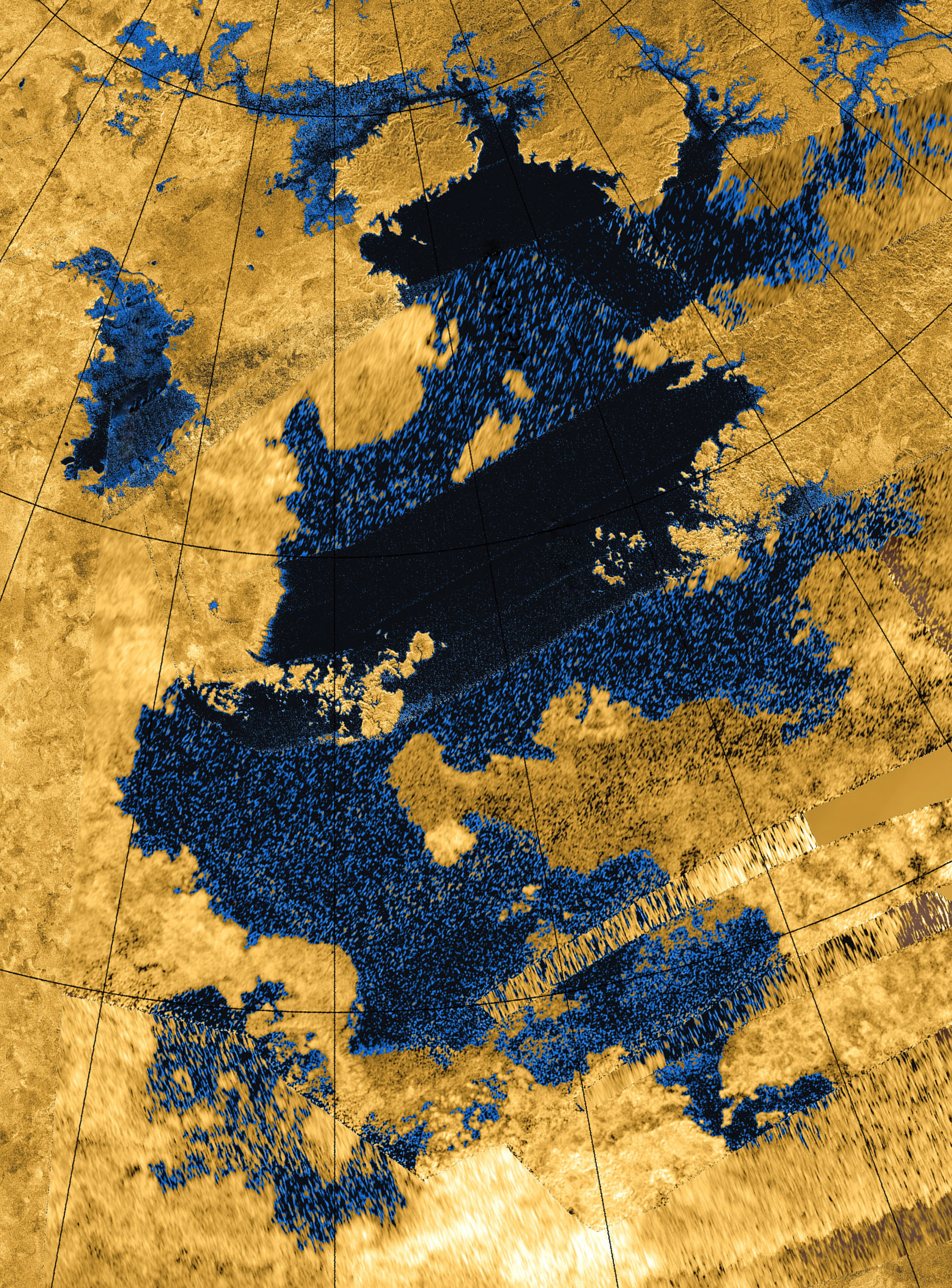
- False-color mosaic of synthetic aperture radar images showing all of Kraken Mare. The large island Mayda Insula is left of top center, and Jingpo Lacus is at upper left. A portion of Ligeia Mare enters the view at top right.
- Feature type: Mare
- Coordinates: 68°N 310°W
- Diameter: 1,170 km (Note: The USGS web site gives the size as a "diameter", but it is actually the length in the longest dimension.)
- Eponym: Kraken

Kraken Mare /ˈkrɑːkən ˈmɑːreɪ/ is the largest known hydrocarbon sea on the surface of Saturn's moon Titan. It was discovered by the space probe Cassini in 2006, and was named in 2008 after the Kraken, a legendary sea monster. It covers an area slightly bigger than the Caspian Sea on Earth, making it the largest known lake in the Solar System.

== Description ==
At 500,000 km^{2}, Kraken Mare is thought to be the largest body of liquid on Titan. It lies in the moon's northern polar region and is thought to be larger than the Caspian Sea on Earth. Its status as a sea of hydrocarbons (mainly liquid methane) was identified by radar imagery. Analyses of the Cassini radar altimeter data used as a sounder have shown that the main body of Kraken Mare is at least 100 metres (330 ft) deep and likely deeper than 300 metres (980 ft). One of its northernmost bays (Moray Sinus) has a depth of 85 metres (279 ft) at its center and shows an attenuation of the signal in the liquid that is compatible with a composition of 70% methane, 16% nitrogen and 14% ethane (assuming ideal mixing). Shallow capillary waves 1.5 centimetres (0.59 in) high moving at 0.7 metres per second (2.3 ft/s; 1.6 mph; 2.5 km/h) have been detected on the surface of Kraken Mare.

An island in the sea is named Mayda Insula. Kraken Mare may be hydrologically connected to the second-largest sea on Titan, Ligeia Mare. This connection has been suggested for the difference in sea composition, as certain compounds flow into Kraken Mare from Ligeia Mare. In addition, Kraken Mare has a lower methane concentration than Ligeia Mare.

The narrow constriction in the sea at 317°W, 67°N, about 17 kilometres (11 mi) wide and similar in size to the Strait of Gibraltar, officially named Seldon Fretum, has been termed the 'Throat of Kraken' and suggested to be a location of significant currents. Titan's orbital eccentricity may lead to tides of 1 metre (3.3 ft) in Kraken Mare, generating currents here of 0.5 metres per second (1.6 ft/s; 1.1 mph; 1.8 km/h) and possibly whirlpools. Other calculations estimate tides as high as 5 metres (16 ft).

Changing features known as "Magic Islands" are observed in Kraken Mare. These features, which are further indications of an active hydrocarbon cycle on Titan, are possibly rising bubbles due to nitrogen exsolution.

== Observation and exploration ==
Kraken Mare, along with other Lakes of Titan, was first discovered by the Cassini–Huygens space probe on July 22, 2006. This was accomplished by noticing that certain dark regions, especially near the poles, had low radar reflectivity, as well as similar morphological features to that of terrestrial lakes. Many observations since have confirmed these findings. In addition to the radar images, the Cassini instrument VIMS (Visible and Infrared Mapping Spectrometer) has surveyed Kraken Mare and its surroundings.

There have been multiple proposals and ideas to explore the depths of Kraken Mare via probes and submarines. One such submarine has gone through a phase one NASA study, complete with submarine design and schematics. Another proposal, the Titan Mare Explorer was a finalist to explore another lake Ligeia Mare, with Kraken Mare as a secondary target, but InSight, a Mars lander, was ultimately approved instead. The Titan Mare Explorer was also suggested for inclusion on the unprogressed Titan Saturn System Mission.

While a mission to Titan has been approved, the drone Dragonfly, there are no current missions to explore Kraken Mare or other lakes on Titan.

== Gallery ==
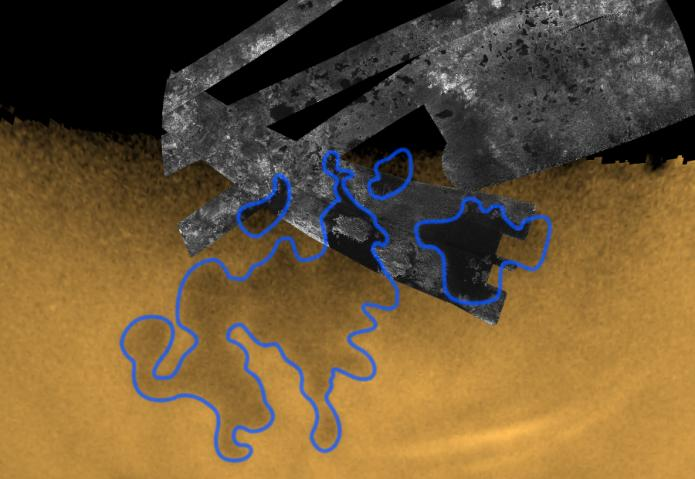
Synthetic aperture radar image (top) overlaid onto a visible light/infrared image of Titan's north polar region, showing the full extent of Kraken Mare

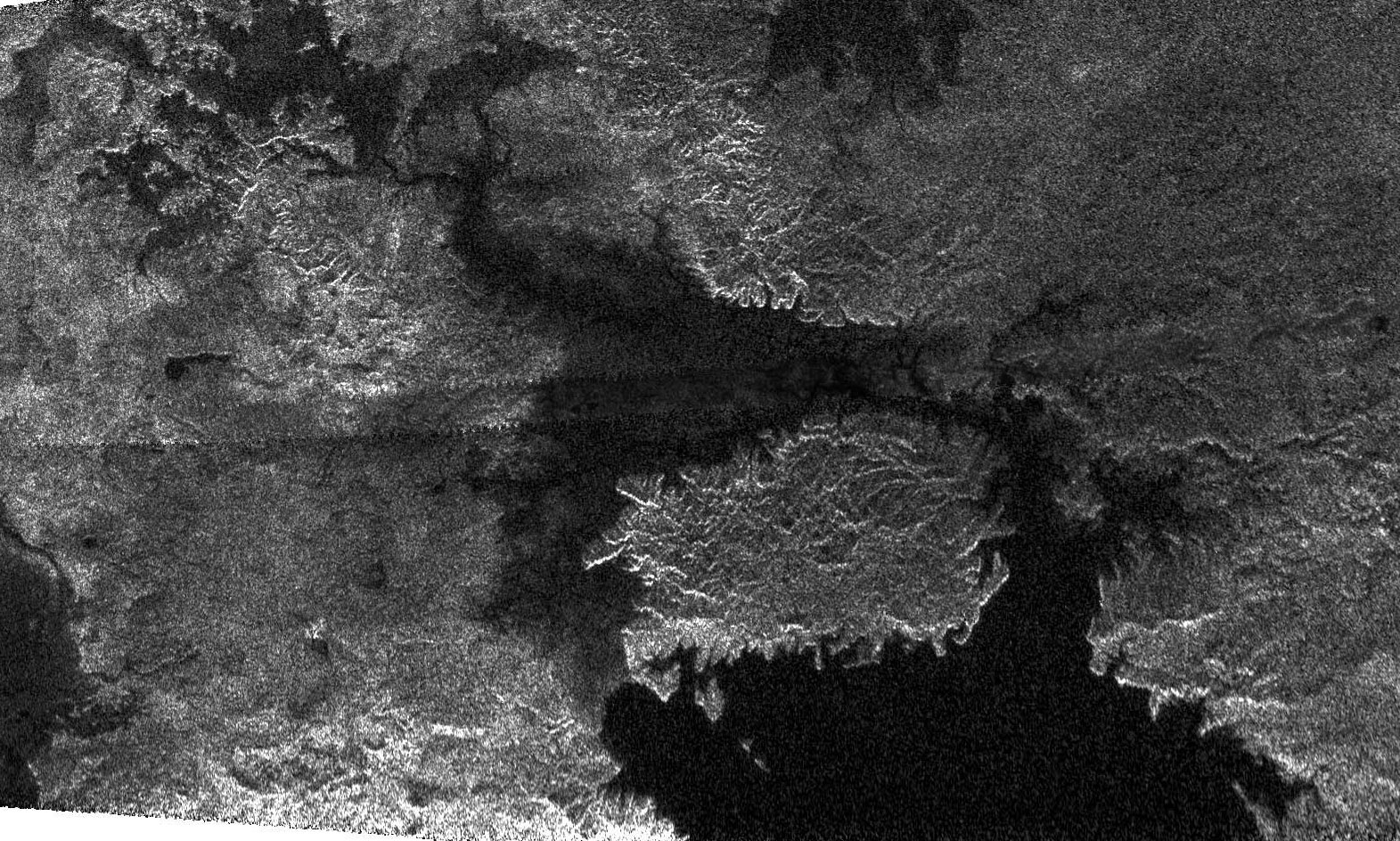
Radar image showing the northern portion of Kraken Mare, including the large island Mayda Insula

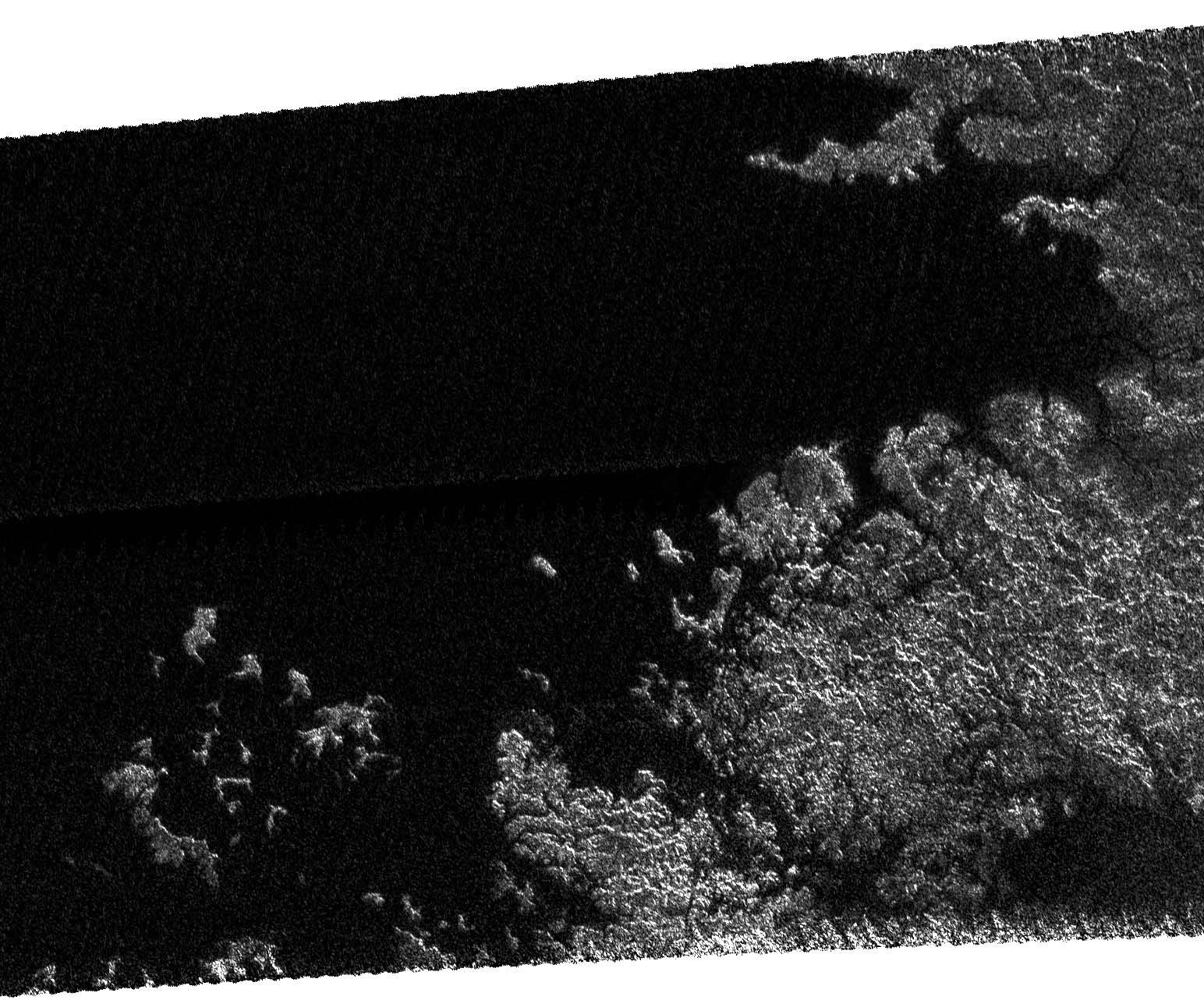
Radar image of a portion of Kraken Mare with a rugged coastline and numerous islands

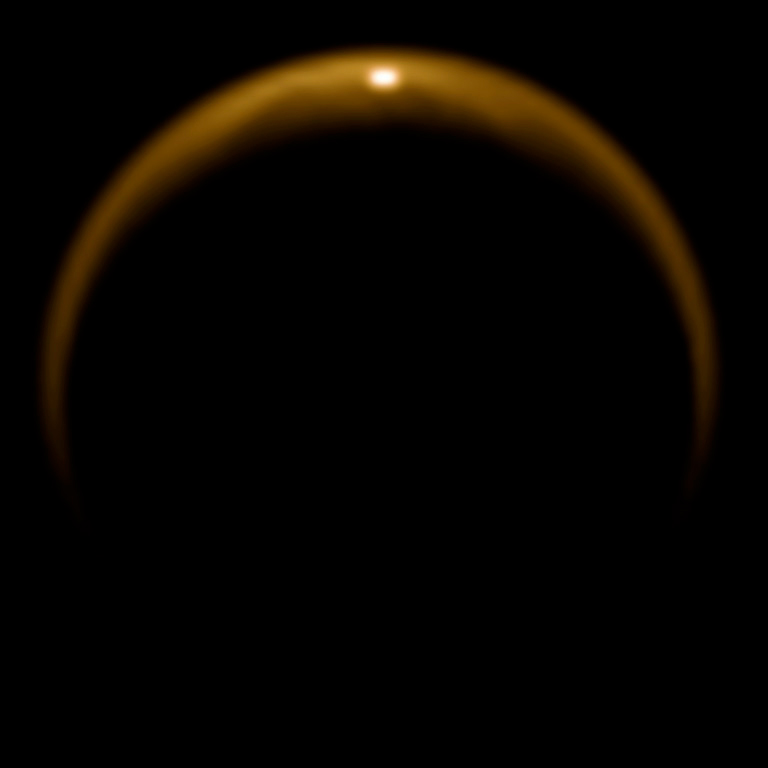
Specular reflection off Jingpo Lacus in the Kraken Mare region, observed by Cassini on July 8, 2009

== See also ==
- List of geological features on Titan
