= Guabonito (crater) =

Ring of features on Titan

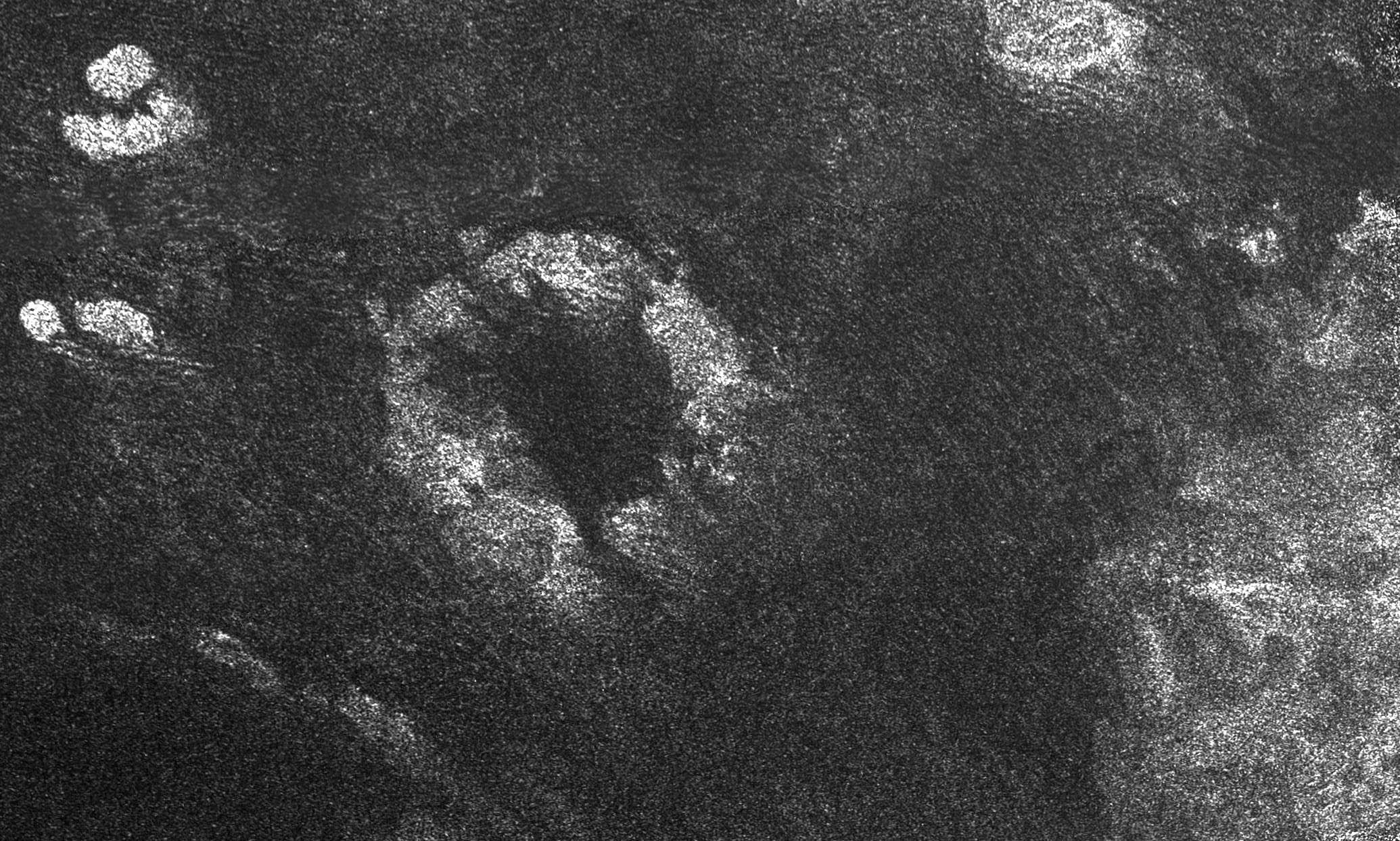
- Cassini radar view of Guabonito
- Feature type: Ring feature
- Eponym: Guabonito

Guabonito is a ring of bright features on Saturn's moon Titan. Currently, the feature is thought to be a partially buried impact crater, with the bright features representing the crater's rim.

== History ==
Guabonito was first seen in Cassini images taken in October 2004 and has been observed several times since.

Guabonito was observed by the Cassini radar instrument's synthetic aperture radar imaging mode on April 30, 2006.

== Location ==
This ringed features, 90 kilometers across, is located in Titan's Shangri-La dark region, near the boundary with Xanadu, and is centered at 10.9°S 150.8°W.

== Namesake ==
This feature is named after Guabonito, the Taíno Indian sea goddess who taught the use of amulets.
