= Regio =

Regio (pl. regiones) is the Latin word for ‘region’ and the Italian word for ‘royal’

It may refer to:

- Regiopolis, a concept for urban centers in between metropolitan areas.

== Ancient toponymy ==
- Regiones of Augustan Italy, the departments in which Roman Emperor Augustus divided Italy.
- 14 regions of the Augustan Rome, in ancient Rome as a name for quartiers of the city of Rome
- 14 regions of Medieval Rome, resulting from the redivision of the Rome after the revolution of 1143
- Regio, in ancient Constantinople as a name for the 14 quarters of the city of Constantinople, defined in analogy with those of Rome
- Regio Aromatica, name for the Horn of Africa
- Regiones, administrative subdivisions of the kingdoms of Anglo-Saxon England

== Astronomy ==
- Regio (astronomy), which, in planetary geology, is a large area of a planet or moon that is strongly differentiated in colour or albedo
  - A regio of Venus:
    - Alpha Regio
    - Asteria Regio
    - Beta Regio
    - Ovda Regio
  - A regio of Pluto:
    - Belton Regio
    - Lowell Regio
    - Tombaugh Regio
  - A regio of Titan:
    - Tui Regio
  - A regio of Ganymede:
    - Galileo Regio
  - A regio on Phoebe:
    - Leto Regio
  - A regio on Iapetus:
    - Cassini Regio

== See also ==
- Regio Ducal, a former opera house in Milan
- Teatro Regio (disambiguation), several theaters in Italy
- Regio Esercito, the army of the Kingdom of Italy
- Regia Marina, the navy of the Kingdom of Italy
- Regio Esercito (World War II)
- The Stadler Regio-Shuttle, a German diesel railcar
- Regio Călători, a Romanian railway company
- Regio (Swiss railway train), a category of train service in Switzerland
