= Mayda Insula =

Island on Kraken Mare on Titan

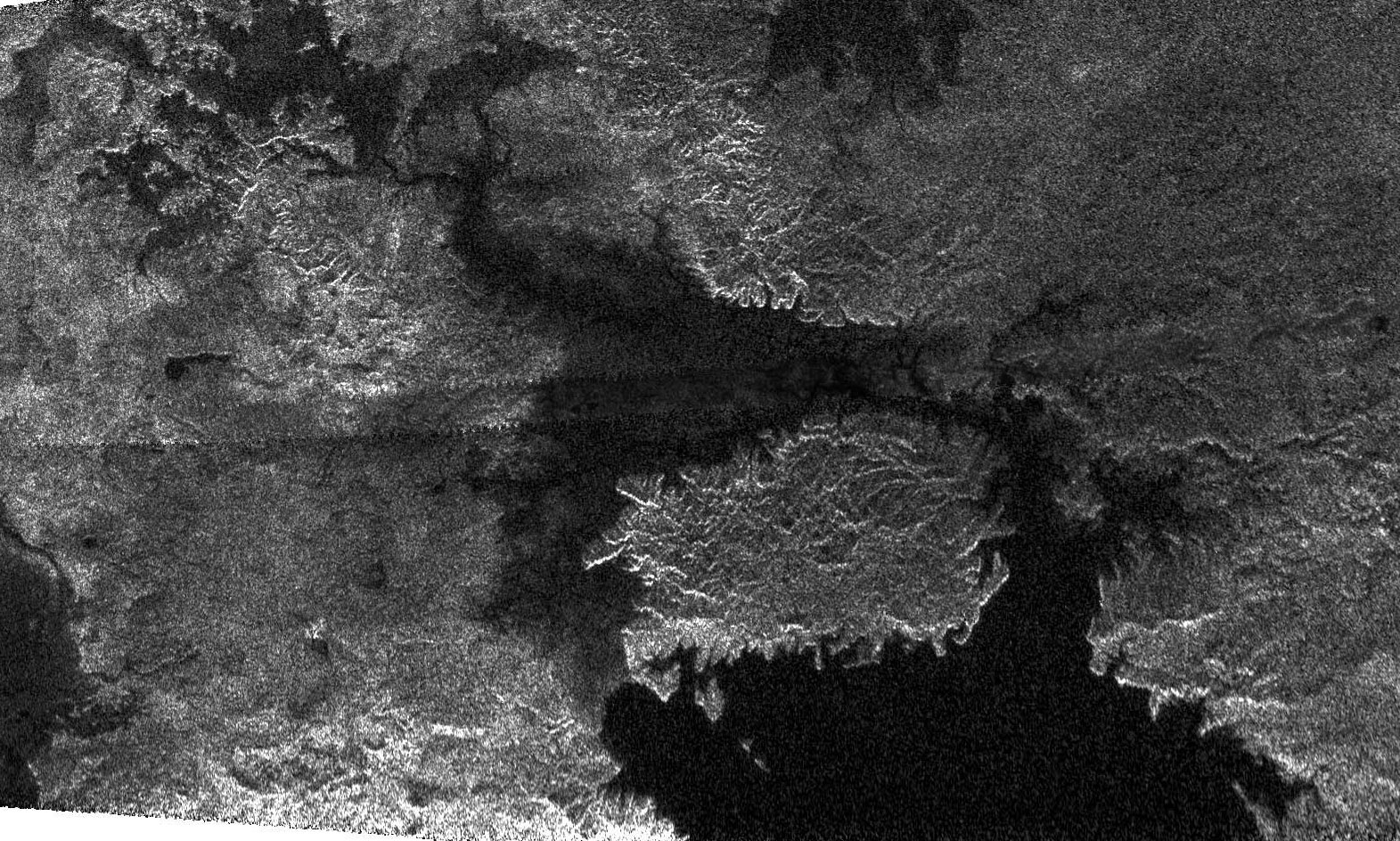
Radar image of Mayda Insula (just right and below center) in Kraken Mare

Mayda Insula is an island in the Kraken Mare, a body of liquid composed primarily of methane, on Saturn's largest moon Titan. Mayda Insula is the first island (insula) to be named on a planet or moon other than Earth.

== Discovery and naming ==
Mayda Insula was discovered by the Cassini–Huygens mission to Saturn. Its name was approved by the International Astronomical Union Working Group for Planetary System Nomenclature on April 11, 2008, becoming the first named island on a planetary body other than earth, and the largest. NASA notes, however, that the possibility Mayda Insula is actually peninsular (i.e., connected to the mainland by a strip of land) cannot be conclusively ruled out. All of the insulae on Titan have been named for legendary islands and "Mayda Insula" was derived from the legendary island Mayda which was thought to exist in the northeastern Atlantic Ocean. Its name was approved the same day as the names of Kraken Mare and Ligeia Mare.

== Characteristics ==
Mayda Insula lies in the northern end of the Kraken Mare near Titan's north pole. The island has a northernmost latitude of 80.3 degrees north and a southernmost latitude of 77.4 degrees north; it has a westernmost longitude of approximately 321.2 degrees west and an easternmost longitude of 302.7 degrees west. The island is 168 kilometres (104 mi) wide at its widest point. Its dimensions are approximately 90 by 150 kilometres (56 by 93 mi), about the same size as the Big Island of Hawaii.

The highest point of the interior of Mayda Insula is approximately 1,200 metres (3,900 ft) above its shoreline. Slopes are relatively mild at approximately 1.5 degrees on average, though they can approach 5 degrees in some locations. Radar images of Titan's surface show that Mayda Insula's coasts display evidence of being changed by fluvial and lacustrine processes. Analyses of these fluvial features suggested that approximately 2 km^{3} of material has been eroded from Mayda Insula and deposited elsewhere in the Kraken Mare basin.

== In popular culture ==
Mayda Insula features in Michael Carroll's novel On the Shores of Titan's Farthest Sea: A Scientific Novel. The 39th chapter of the book is titled "The Hunchback of Mayda Insula".

The extreme metal band, High Priest of Saturn released an eponymous album in 2013 which has a song titled On Mayda Insula. Regarding the song, they said "drowning in Kraken Mare is a metaphor for being overcome by fear and anxiety while Mayda Insula is a safe haven where you can find peace". Kraken Mare is also a song on the album.

== See also ==
- Lakes of Titan
- List of geological features on Titan
