= Santorini Facula =

Bright spot on Titan

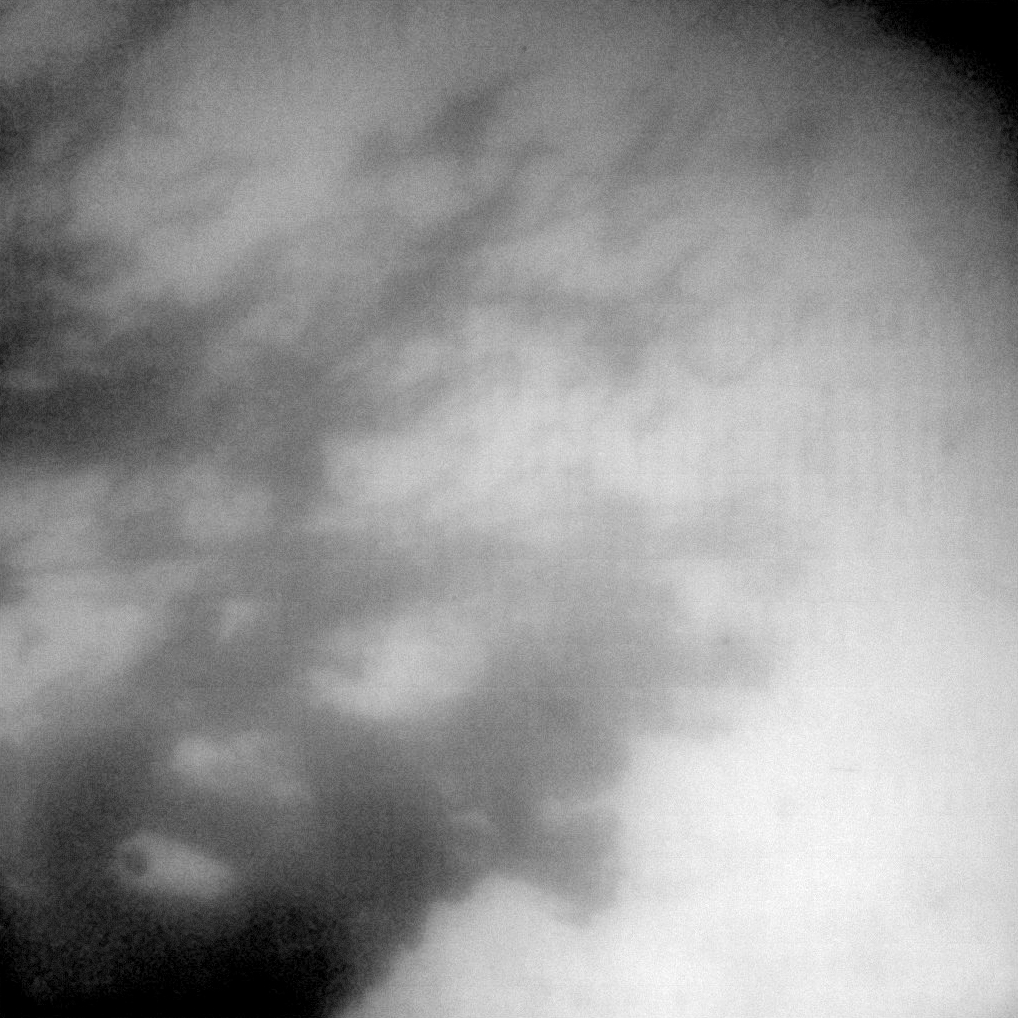
- Santorini Facula is an elongated bright spot around a dark impact crater in lower left corner
- Feature type: Facula
- Coordinates: 2° 24′ 0″ N, 145° 36′ 0″ W
- Diameter: 140 km
- Eponym: Santorini

The Santorini Facula is a facula, or bright spot, surrounding a 40-km-wide impact crater on the surface of Titan. It was named after the Greek island Santorini in 2006.
