= Echoriat Montes =

Mountains on Titan

The Echoriat Montes are the largest range of mountains on Titan, a natural satellite of the planet Saturn. They are located at 7.4°S 213.8°W near the equator and were named in December 2011 after being imaged as part of the Cassini–Huygens mission to Saturn. The large peaks of the equatorial region have been interpreted as evidence of cryovolcanism.

The Echoriat Montes derive their name from the legendarium of J.R.R. Tolkien and ultimately from the Norse and Celtic mythologies from which the author drew. The Ehoriat (or Echoriad) are a northern mountain range protecting the Elven kingdom of "the first age" in the Lord of the Rings.
