= Arnar =

Arnar is a given name. Notable people with the name include:

- Arnar Freyr Arnarsson (born 1996), Icelandic handball player
- Arnar Freyr Frostason (born 1988), an Icelandic rapper (also known as Arnar Úlfur)
- Arnar Grétarsson (born 1972), Icelandic football player
- Arnar Guðjónsson, Icelandic basketball coach
- Arnar Gunnlaugsson (born 1973), Icelandic footballer
- Arnar Jónsson (actor) (born 1943), Icelandic actor
- Arnar Freyr Jónsson (born 1983), Icelandic basketball player
- Arnar Þór Jónsson (born 1971), Icelandic lawyer
- Arnar Pétursson (runner) (born 1991), Icelandic long-distance runner
- Arnar Darri Pétursson (born 1991), Icelandic footballer
- Arnar Sigurðsson (born 1981), Icelandic tennis player
- Arnar Viðarsson (born 1978), Icelandic football player
- Arnar Førsund (born 1986), Norwegian footballer

As a middle name:

- Davíð Arnar Ágústsson (born 1996), Icelandic basketball player
- Sigtryggur Arnar Björnsson (born 1993), Icelandic basketball player
- Guðmundur Arnar Guðmundsson (born 1982), Icelandic film director and screenwriter
- Stefán Arnar Gunnarsson (born 1978), Icelandic handball coach and player
- Hákon Arnar Haraldsson (born 2003), Icelandic footballer
- Viktor Arnar Ingólfsson (born 1955), Icelandic writer of crime fiction
- Jón Arnar Ingvarsson (born 1972), Icelandic basketball player and coach
- Jón Arnar Magnússon (born 1969), Icelandic decathlete
- Guðjón Arnar Kristjánsson (born 1944), Icelandic MP
