= Jingpo Lacus =

Lake on Titan

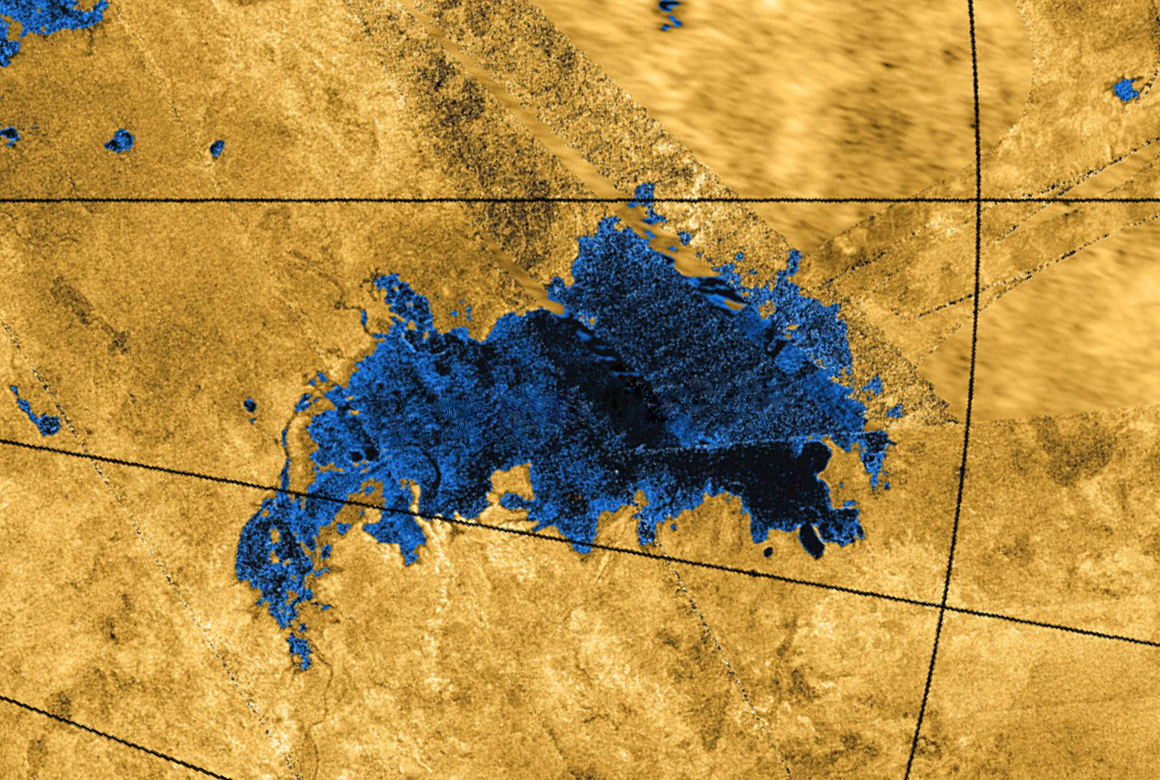
- Jingpo Lacus in a false-color synthetic aperture radar image of Titan's north polar region. An extension of Kraken Mare enters the view at upper left.
- Feature type: Lacus
- Coordinates: 73°N 336°W
- Diameter: 240 km (Note: The USGS web site gives the size as a "diameter", but it is actually the length in the longest dimension.)
- Eponym: Jingpo Lake

Jingpo Lacus is a lake in the north polar region of Titan, the planet Saturn's largest moon. It and similarly sized Ontario Lacus are the largest known bodies of liquid on Titan after the three maria (Kraken Mare, Ligeia Mare, and Punga Mare). It is composed of liquid hydrocarbons (mainly methane and ethane). It is west of Kraken Mare at 73° N, 336° W, roughly 240 km (150 mi) long, similar to the length of Lake Onega on Earth. Its namesake is Jingpo Lake, a lake in China.

== Specular reflection ==
On 8 July 2009, Cassini's Visual and Infrared Mapping Spectrometer (VIMS) observed a specular reflection in 5 μm infrared light off Jingpo Lacus at 71° N, 337° W. (This has sometimes been described less accurately as at the southern shoreline of Kraken Mare.) Specular reflections indicate a smooth, mirror-like surface, so the observation corroborated the inference of the presence of a large liquid body drawn from radar imaging. The observation was made soon after the north polar region emerged from 15 years of winter darkness.

== Gallery ==
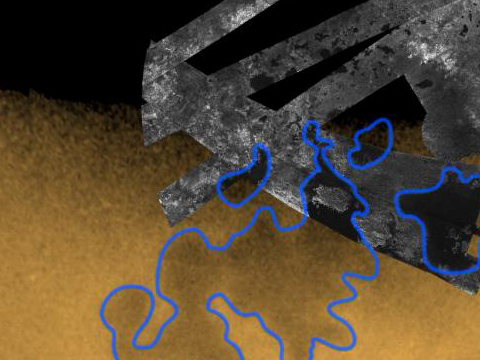
Synthetic aperture radar image (top) overlaid onto a visible light/infrared image of Titan's north polar region, showing Jingpo Lacus (at center) and other liquid bodies (Kraken Mare at bottom, Ligeia Mare at right, and Punga Mare) outlined in blue.

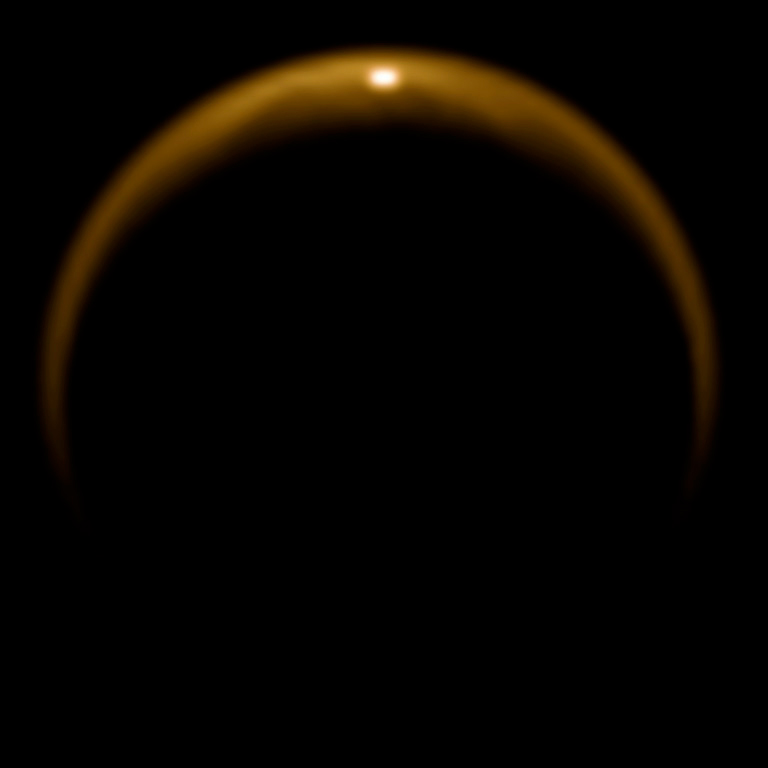
Specular reflection off Jingpo Lacus, observed by the Cassini probe on July 8, 2009

== See also ==
- Lakes of Titan
