= Xanadu (Titan) =

Albedo feature on Saturn's moon Titan

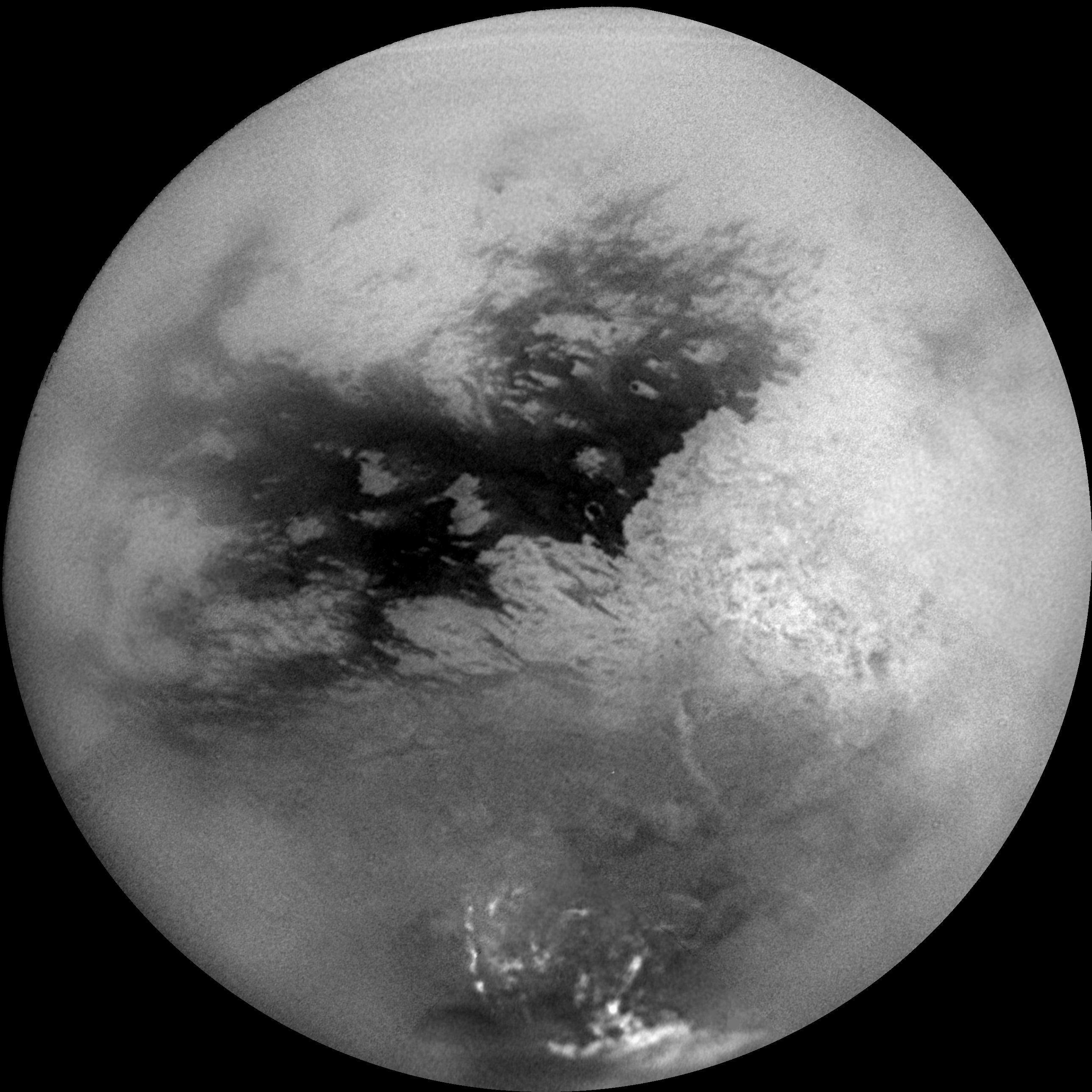
- Xanadu is the bright area at the centre-right of this image
- Feature type: Bright albedo feature
- Coordinates: 15°S 100°W
- Diameter: 3,400 km
- Eponym: Xanadu

Xanadu (often called "Xanadu Regio", though this is not its official name) is a highly reflective area on the leading hemisphere of Saturn's moon Titan. Its name comes from an alternate transcription of Shangdu, the summer capital of the Yuan dynasty established by Kublai Khan and made famous by Samuel Taylor Coleridge.

The feature was first identified in 1994 by astronomers using the Hubble Space Telescope at infrared wavelengths, and has recently been imaged in more detail by the Cassini space probe. Xanadu is about the size of Australia. Preliminary observations indicate that Xanadu is a plateau-like region of highly reflective water ice, contrasting somewhat with the darker lower regions. In turn, these seem to contrast quite sharply with the very dark maria. The maria were once believed to be seas of liquid hydrocarbons; they are now thought to be plains.

Images by Cassini during encounters in October and December 2004 reveal complex albedo patterns in the western portion of Xanadu. While scientists are still debating the significance and cause of the albedo patterns, one likely culprit is tectonism. Evidence for this exists in a pattern of criss-crossing dark lineaments near the western side of Xanadu. Scientists are also investigating the boundary between Xanadu and Shangri-La, a dark region to the west. The shape of the boundary suggests that the dark material embays the bright terrain.

Radar images taken by Cassini have revealed dunes, hills, rivers and valleys present on Xanadu. The features are likely carved in water ice by liquid methane or ethane. Water ice behaves similarly to rock at the pressures and temperatures present on Titan's surface.

== See also ==
- Tui Regio
- Xanadu (disambiguation)
- Titan
