= Tsegihi =

Albedo feature on Titan

- Feature type: Bright albedo feature
- Coordinates: 40°S 10°W
- Eponym: Navajo sacred place

Tsegihi is a bright region in Titan's southern mid-latitudes. It is centered at 40°S 10°W.

Tsegihi is named for a sacred place of the Navajo. The first line in the Navajo Nightsong Tsegihi, The House Made of Dawn runs:

In Tsegihi, oh you who dwell
In the house made of the dawn...
