= Rerir Montes =

Mountains on Titan

The Rerir Montes are the third-largest range of mountains on Titan, a natural satellite of the planet Saturn. They are located at 4.8°S 212.1°W near the equator and were named in December 2011 after being imaged as part of the Cassini–Huygens mission to Saturn.

The Rerir Montest derive their name from the legendarium of J.R.R. Tolkien and ultimately from the Norse and Celtic mythologies from which the author drew.
