= Perkunas Virgae =

Streak of color on Titan

Coordinates: 27.0°S 162.0°W

Perkunas Virgae is a streak of colour on Titan, the natural satellite of Saturn, centred at 27° latitude south and 162 longitude west. It measures 980 km at its widest point. It was discovered in images transmitted by the Cassini mission and named after Perkūnas, the main rain god of Lithuanian mythology.
