= Sinlap =

Impact crater on Titan

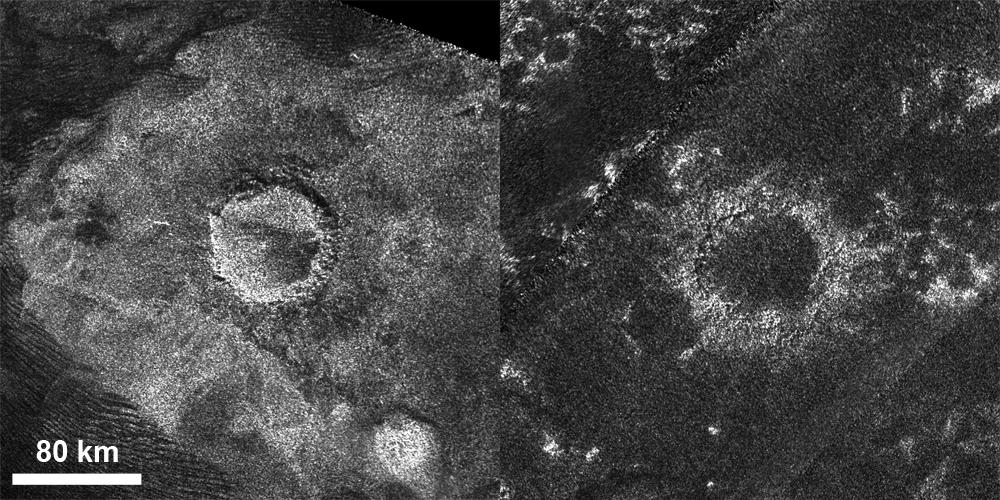
- This set of images from the radar instrument on NASA's Cassini spacecraft shows a relatively "fresh" crater called Sinlap (left) and an extremely degraded crater called Soi (right)
- Feature type: Central-peak impact crater
- Location: Fensal, Titan
- Coordinates: 11.30°N 16.00°W
- Diameter: ~80 km (50 mi)
- Depth: 640^{+160}_{−150} m (2015 estimate); 1 300±200 m (2006 estimate)
- Discoverer: Cassini
- Eponym: Kachin spirit

Sinlap is a shallow impact crater on Titan, a natural satellite of Saturn. Located in the Fensal region, Sinlap is one of the most pristine craters on Titan, surrounded by a bright ejecta blanket.

== Observation and naming ==
Sinlap was discovered by the images transmitted by the Cassini–Huygens mission on the 15th of February, 2005. It is named after a Jingpo sky spirit who bestows wisdom to his worshippers; the name Sinlap was officially approved by the International Astronomical Union (IAU) in 2006.

== Characteristics ==
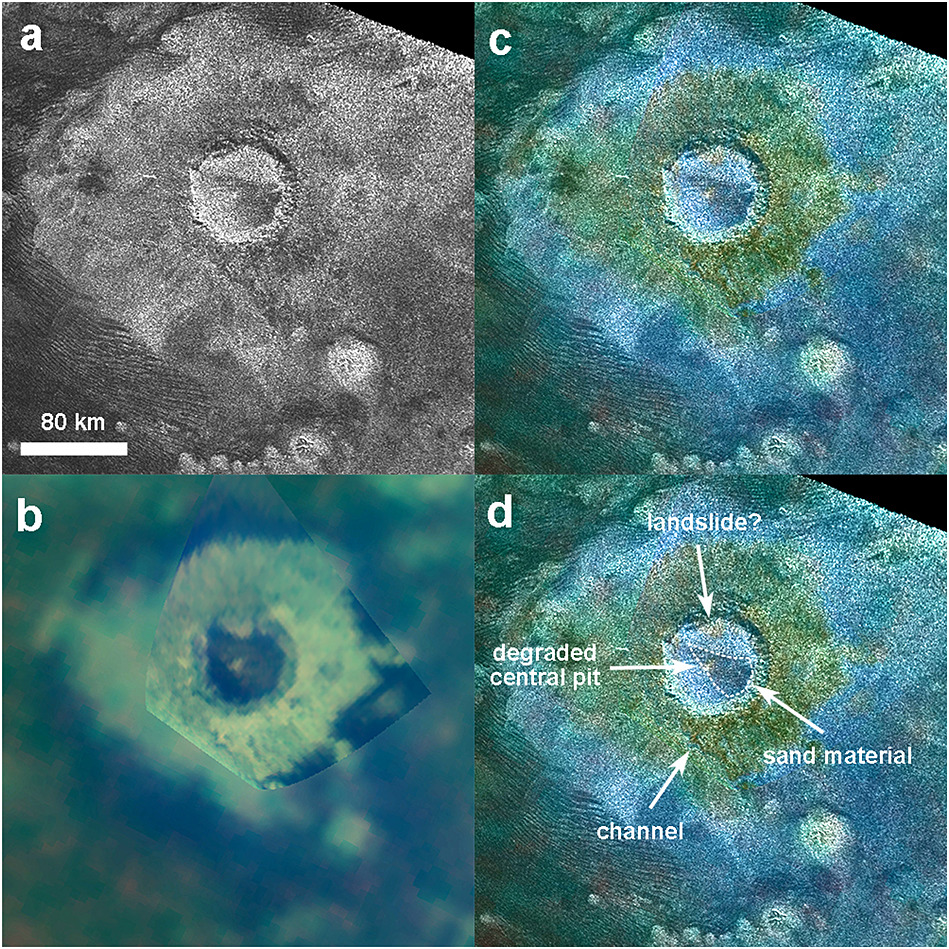
An analysis of Sinlap by C. D. Neish and collaborators: a) Cassini SAR image of Sinlap b) Cassini VIMS image of Sinlab c) Combined SAR and VIMS composite image d) Annotated version of c, with features labelled

Sinlap is located at 11,3° latitude north and 16,0° longitude west, within the Fensal region. It measures approximately 80 km in diameter. Sinlap's depth is poorly constrained; a team of researchers led by C. Elachi estimated Sinlap's depth as 1,300±200 meters in 2006, whilst a different team led C. D. Neish estimated that Sinlap is only 640^{+160}_{−150} m deep in 2015. Nevertheless, the crater is rather shallow, having a depth-to-diameter ratio comparable to similarly-sized craters observed on Jupiter's moon, Ganymede. Sinlap's crater floor is relatively flat, with a ~2 kilometer wide bright spot located slightly west of center. There is no evidence of a prominent central peak or concentric rings, as would be the case for a pristine central-peak crater and multi-ring impact basin respectively. However, the bright spot's central location indicates that it may represent the remnants of a central peak, either buried by sediment or eroded down. The crater is surrounded by a blanket of radar-bright ejecta, named Bazaruto Facula, that extends over 80 kilometers from the crater rim. The ejecta blanket appears symmetrical in Cassini VIMS imagery, though in synthetic-aperture radar (SAR) imagery the ejecta blanket is heavily skewed to the east. Partial burial of shallower sections of the blanket by sand dunes may account for the discrepancy, as SAR imagery can penetrate further underground and reveal more of the structure. The ejecta blanket contains an inner, slightly darker annular ring that extends roughly 60 kilometers from the crater rim.

Despite the young age of Sinlap, its rim, ejecta blanket, and much of the crater floor lack signs of freshly-exposed water ice, which would be expected of a recent impact event blasting out ejecta of Titan's water-rich crust. Instead, much of Sinlap appears spectrally similar to the much older organic-rich equatorial bright regions of Titan. The floor of Sinlap is compositionally inhomogeneous, still showing patches of water ice-rich sediment. The reason for the organic-rich composition of Sinlap is unclear. The organic-rich composition of the ejecta may simply be representative of the composition of Titan's upper crust, or the ejecta was rapidly altered by chemical weathering processes. Sinlap is also at least somewhat eroded, with its flat crater floor indicative of erosion driven by liquid methane.

If the impacting object was icy in composition, then the object that created Sinlap was likely 5–10 kilometers in diameter and was travelling at a velocity of 7–15 km/s. The impact event that created Sinlap likely was violent enough to generate a vapor and ejecta plume tall enough to breach Titan's lower atmosphere, spreading ejecta over a much larger area than it otherwise would. Following the impact, erosion would subsequently flatten out or bury the central peak, as rainfall redistributes material around the ejecta blanket.
