= Ganesa Macula =

Feature on Titan

Coordinates: 50.0°N 87.3°W

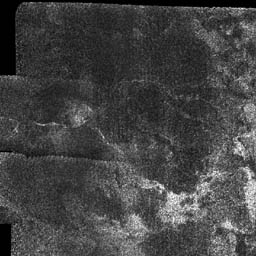
- Ganesa Macula imaged by Cassini radar.
- Feature type: Macula
- Eponym: Ganesha

Ganesa Macula is a dark feature on Saturn's moon Titan. It is named after the Hindu god Ganesha.

Ganesa was formerly tentatively identified as a cryovolcanic dome: the result of a mixture of water and ammonia erupting from the center of the dome and spreading out to form a pancake-like deposit. However, topographical data have since shown that it is not dome-shaped, and as a result, there is no longer any evidence that it is of volcanic origin.
