= Tui Regio =

Region on Titan

- Feature type: Regio
- Coordinates: 20°S 130°W
- Eponym: Tui

Tui Regio (located at 20°S, 130°W) is a region on Titan, the Saturnian moon, in the southwest corner of Xanadu, named after Tui, a Chinese goddess of happiness, joy and water. Tui appears to lack the erosion channels that mark other highland regions on Titan, suggesting it may be geologically young. Patterns resembling lava flows have also been observed, suggesting cryovolcanism.
