= Albedo feature =

Region of a planet's surface which contrasts in brightness to its surroundings

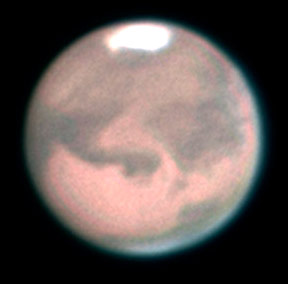
A telescopic view of Mars at full phase, featuring its prominent maria and south polar ice cap

In planetary geology, an albedo feature is a large area on the surface of a planet (or other Solar System body) which shows a contrast in brightness or darkness (albedo) with adjacent areas.

Historically, albedo features were the first (and usually only) features to be seen and named on Mars and Mercury. Early classical maps (such as those of Schiaparelli and Antoniadi) showed only albedo features, and it was not until the arrival of space probes that other surface features such as craters could be seen.

On bodies other than Mars and Mercury, an albedo feature is sometimes called a regio.

On bodies with a very thick atmosphere like Venus or Titan, permanent albedo features cannot be seen using ordinary optical telescopes because the surface is not visible, and only clouds and other transient atmospheric phenomena are seen. The Cassini–Huygens probe observed multiple albedo features on Titan after its arrival in Saturn's orbit in 2004.

The first albedo feature ever seen on another planet was Syrtis Major Planum on Mars in the 17th century.

Today, thanks to space probes, very high-resolution images of surface features on Mars and Mercury are available, and the classical nomenclature based on albedo features has fallen somewhat into disuse, although it is still used for Earth-based observing of Mars by amateur astronomers.

However, for some Solar System bodies (such as Pluto prior to the New Horizons mission), the best available images show only albedo features. These images were usually taken by the Hubble Space Telescope or by ground-based telescopes using adaptive optics.

Cydonia Mensae on Mars is an example of an albedo feature.

== See also ==
- Classical albedo features on Mars
- List of albedo features on Mercury
- Massif
