= Shangri-La (Titan) =

Titanian dune field

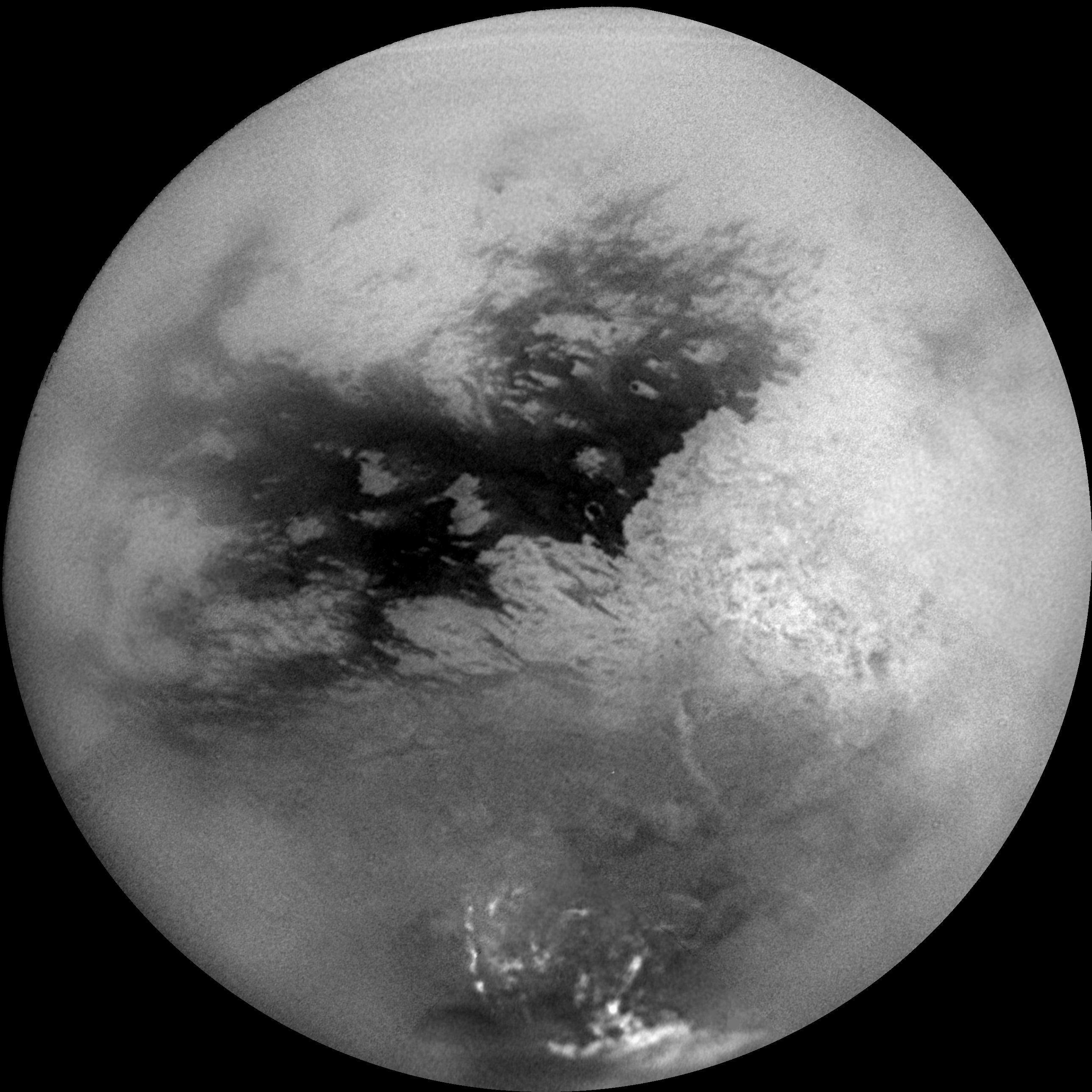
- Shangri-La is the large, dark region at the centre of this image of Titan
- Feature type: Dark albedo feature
- Coordinates: 10°S 165°W
- Eponym: Shangri-La

Shangri-La is a large, dark region of Saturn's moon Titan at 10°S 165°W. It is named after Shangri-La, the mythical paradise in Tibet.

It is thought to be an immense sand sea of dark, carbon-rich material, one of three major equatorial sand seas on the moon (the others being Belet and Fensal).

Shangri-La is studded with bright 'islands' of higher ground, called inselbergs, which are thought to be protrusions of the icy bedrock. The composition of the sand itself is unknown and a current area of research, although orbital observations strongly suggest organic compounds. It has been speculated that the sand may have eroded from sources that no longer exist, although other hypotheses, such as transport of evaporites from hydrocarbon seas and precipitation of organics from the atmosphere have been proposed.

The Huygens probe landed on the west part of Shangri-La, close to the boundary with Adiri.
