= Punga =

Punga may refer to:

- Punga (mythology), the ancestor of sharks in Māori tradition
- "Punga" (song), a song by Klingande
- Punga, Namibia
- Punga, Tanzania
- Punga Mare, a hydrocarbon sea on the moon Titan
- Punga, a village in Cozieni Commune, Buzău County, Romania
- Punga, the silver tree fern (Alsophila dealbata)
- Gabonese National Unity Party (acronym in French: PUNGA)
