= Albano Lacus =

Lake on Titan

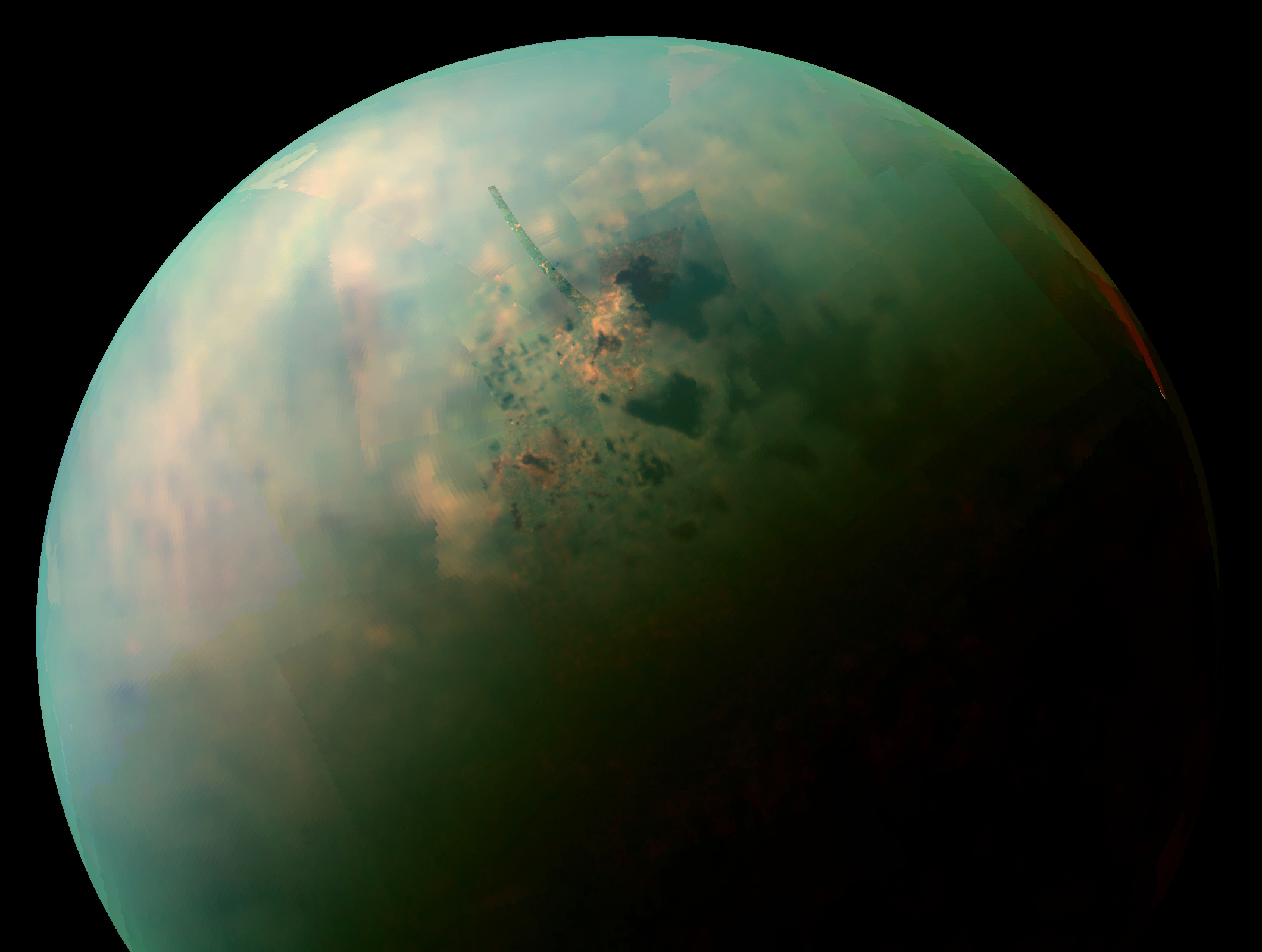
- False-color near infrared view of Titan's northern hemisphere, showing its seas and lakes. Orange areas near some of them may be deposits of organic evaporite left behind by receding liquid hydrocarbon.
- Feature type: Lacus
- Coordinates: 66°N 236.5°W
- Diameter: 6.2km

Albano Lacus is one of a number of hydrocarbon lakes found on Saturn's largest moon, Titan.

The lake is composed of liquid methane and ethane, and was detected by the Cassini space probe.

The lake is 6.2 kilometres (3.9 mi) long. The lake is named after Lake Albano in Italy, and the word "lacus" means lake.

== See also ==
- Lakes of Titan
- Abaya Lacus
- Bolsena Lacus
