= Lakes and rivers of Titan =

Hydrocarbon lakes on Titan, a moon of Saturn

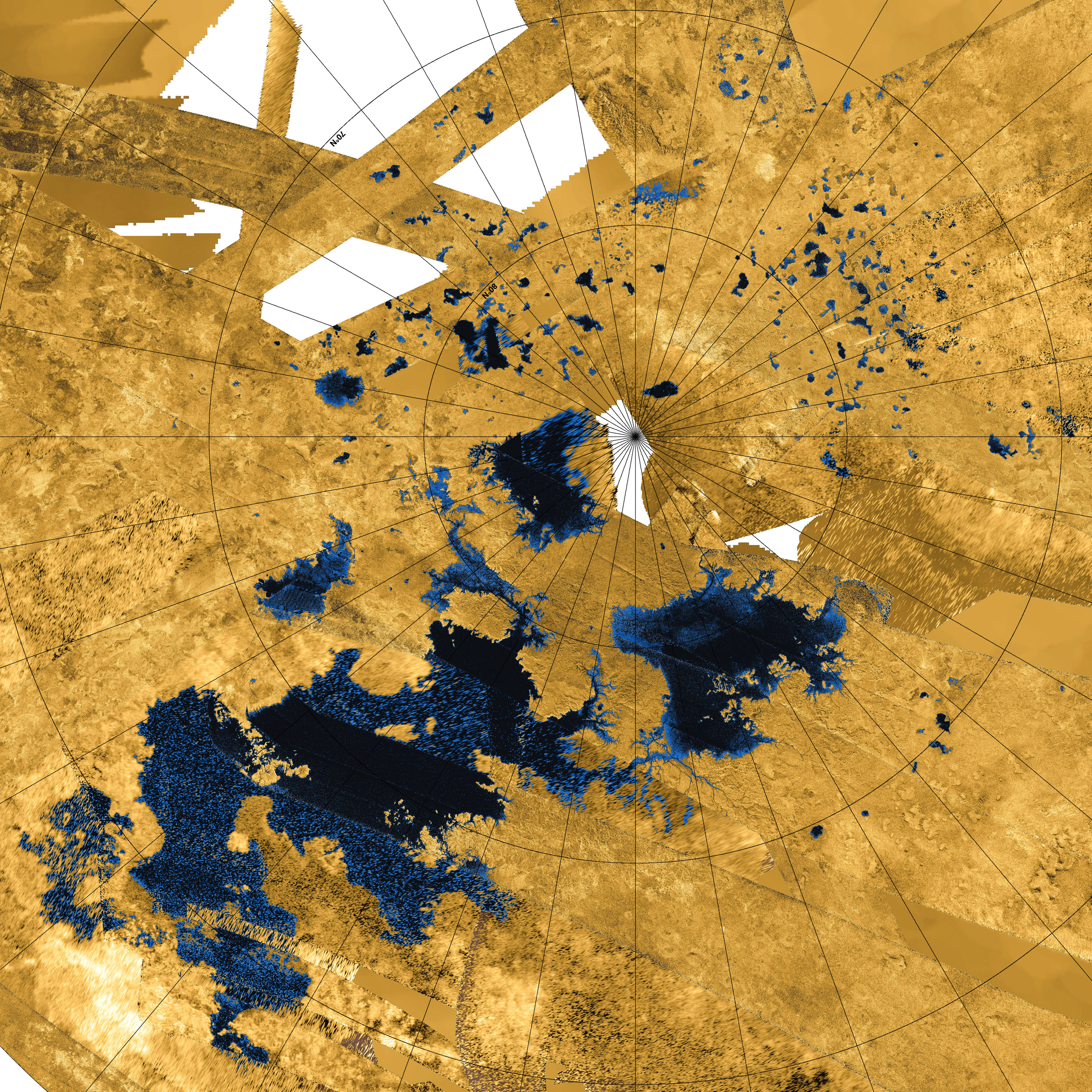
False-color, medium-resolution Cassini synthetic aperture radar mosaic of Titan's north polar region, showing hydrocarbon seas, lakes, and tributary networks. Blue coloring indicates low radar reflectivity areas, caused by bodies of liquid ethane, methane and dissolved nitrogen. Kraken Mare, the largest sea on Titan, is at lower left. Ligeia Mare is the large body below the pole, and Punga Mare at half its size is just left of the pole. White areas have not been imaged.

Lakes of liquid ethane and methane exist on the surface of Titan, Saturn's largest moon. This was confirmed by the Cassini–Huygens space probe, and had been suspected long before. The large bodies of liquid are known as maria (seas) and the small ones as lacūs (lakes).

== History and discovery ==
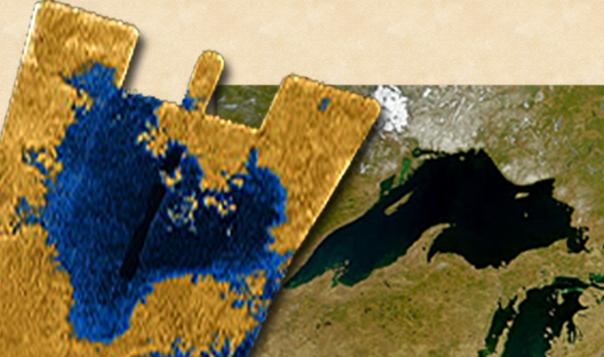
Size comparison of Ligeia Mare with Lake Superior.

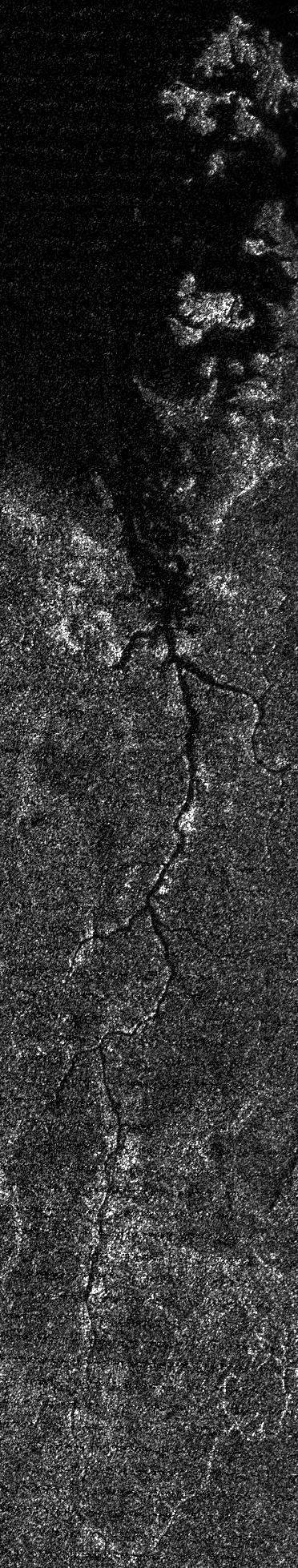
Vid Flumina, a 400-kilometer-long (250 mi) river emptying into Ligeia Mare (in lower right corner of top image).

The possibility of seas on Titan was first suggested by data from the Voyager 1 and Voyager 2 space probes, which flew past Titan in 1980 and 1981. The observations showed that Titan has a thick atmosphere with a temperature and composition potentially capable of supporting liquid hydrocarbons. In 1995, observations from the Hubble Space Telescope and other instruments provided indirect evidence for liquid methane, either in isolated bodies or in oceans spanning much of the moon's surface, analogous to Earth's oceans.

The Cassini mission continued the search for surface liquids after arriving in the Saturn system in 2004. Scientists hoped to detect hydrocarbon lakes or seas through specular reflections of sunlight from their surfaces, but no such reflections were initially observed.

The Huygens probe provided the first close-up observations of Titan's surface when it landed near the equator on January 14, 2005. Images taken during its descent showed no open bodies of liquid but provided evidence that liquid had flowed across the surface in the recent past. Pale hills were crossed by dark drainage channels that led into a broad, flat, dark region. Initially, this region was thought to be a lake or a deposit of a tar-like substance. However, Huygens landed on the region and found it to be solid, with no evidence of liquid. A penetrometer initially indicated that the surface resembled wet clay or a hard crust over a sticky material, but subsequent analysis suggested that the reading resulted from Huygens displacing a large pebble during landing. The surface is now thought to consist of ice grains resembling sand. Images taken after landing showed a flat plain covered with rounded pebbles, which may be composed of water ice and may have been shaped by flowing liquid.

Measurements made by Huygens indicated that heat was conducted away from the probe unusually quickly, suggesting that the ground was damp. One image also appears to show light reflected by a droplet falling through the camera's field of view. Because Titan receives little sunlight, evaporation is slow: about 1 cm of liquid per year, compared with about 1 m of water on Earth. Its atmosphere can hold the equivalent of about 10 meters (33 ft) of liquid before rain forms, compared with about 2 cm (0.79 in) on Earth. Titan's climate is therefore expected to include intense rainfall and flash floods separated by decades or centuries of drought.

Scientists expected liquid ethane and methane to be especially abundant and stable in Titan's polar regions. In the south polar region, a dark feature known as Ontario Lacus was the first suspected lake identified. It may have formed from precipitation associated with clouds that frequently occur in the area. Radar imagery also revealed a possible shoreline near the pole. During a Cassini flyby on July 22, 2006, radar observations of the northern latitudes, then in winter, revealed numerous large, smooth regions that appeared dark to radar. Based on these observations, scientists announced in January 2007 that they had definitive evidence of methane-filled lakes on Titan. The Cassini–Huygens team concluded that these features were almost certainly the long-sought hydrocarbon lakes, the first stable bodies of surface liquid known outside Earth. Some lakes have associated channels and occupy topographic depressions. The limited erosion observed along some channels suggests that erosion on Titan is extremely slow or that more recent processes have erased older river channels and other landforms. Overall, Cassini's radar observations showed that lakes cover only a few percent of Titan's surface and are concentrated near the poles, making Titan substantially drier than Earth. Methane evaporation from lakes covering only 0.002–0.02% of Titan's total surface area may be sufficient to maintain the high relative humidity of methane in the lower atmosphere.

During a Cassini flyby in late February 2007, radar and camera observations revealed several large features in the north polar region interpreted as expanses of liquid methane and ethane. One of these, Ligeia Mare, covers about 126,000 km^{2} (49,000 sq mi), making it slightly larger than Lake Michigan–Huron, the largest freshwater lake on Earth. Another, Kraken Mare, was later found to be about three times larger. A flyby of Titan's southern polar region in October 2007 revealed similar but much smaller lake-like features.

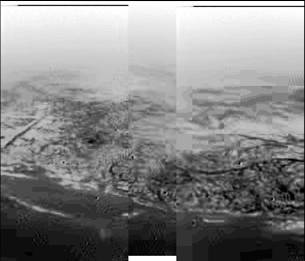
Image of Titan taken during Huygens' descent, showing hills and topographical features that resemble a shoreline and drainage channels.

During a Cassini flyby in December 2007, the Visual and Infrared Mapping Spectrometer observed Ontario Lacus in the south polar region. The instrument identifies materials by how they absorb and reflect infrared light. Radar measurements made in July 2009 and January 2010 indicated that Ontario Lacus is extremely shallow, with an average depth of 0.4–3.2 m (1 ft 4 in – 10 ft 6 in) and a maximum depth of 2.9–7.4 m (9 ft 6 in – 24 ft 3 in). It may therefore resemble a terrestrial mudflat. By comparison, Ligeia Mare in the northern hemisphere has a depth of about 170 m (560 ft).

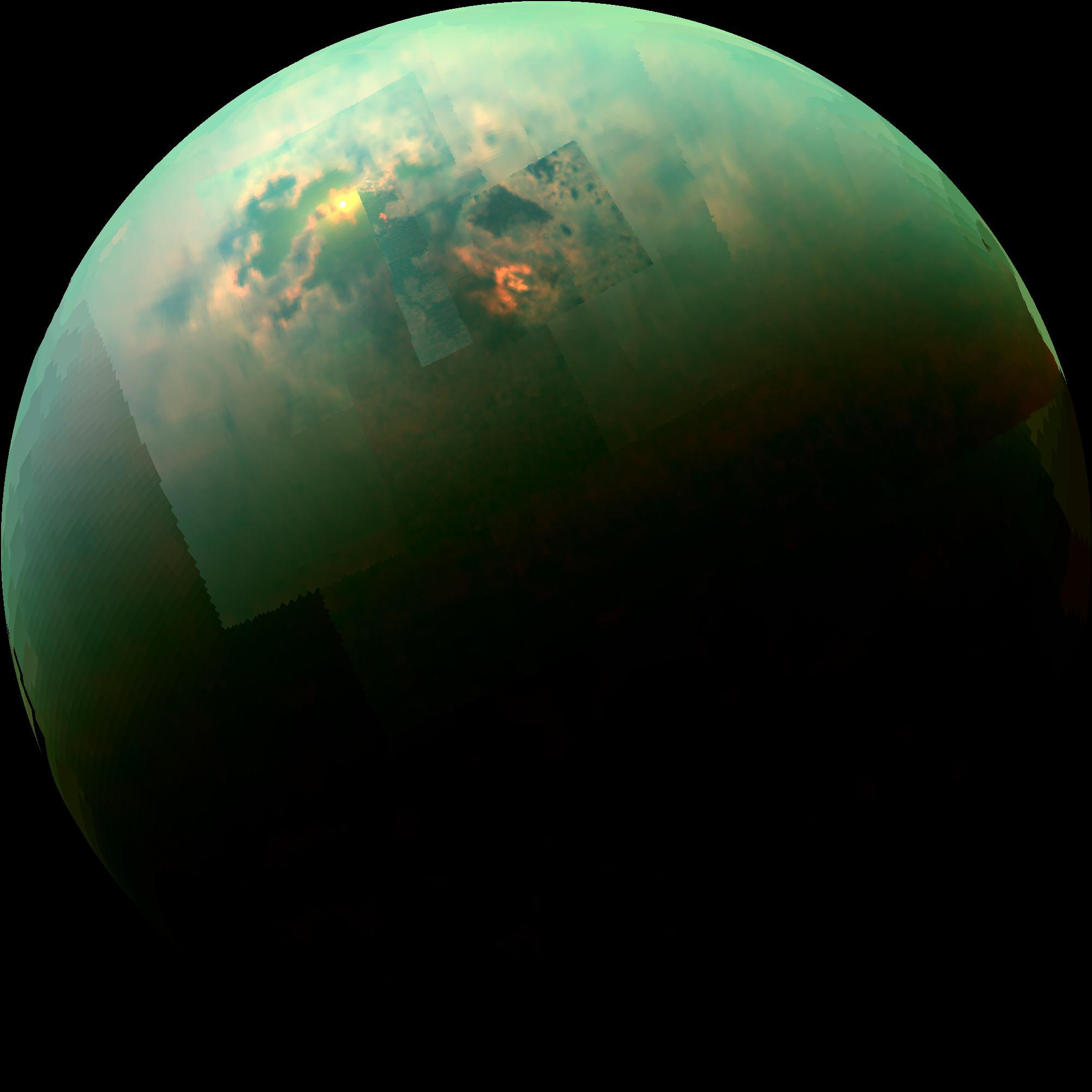
Near-infrared radiation from the Sun reflecting off Titan's hydrocarbon seas.

On December 21, 2008, Cassini passed directly over Ontario Lacus at an altitude of 1,900 km (1,200 mi) and detected a specular reflection in radar observations. The signal was much stronger than expected and saturated the spacecraft's receiver. Its strength indicated that the lake's surface level varied by no more than 3 mm (0.12 in) across a reflecting area about 100 m (330 ft) wide. The reflecting surface was smoother than any natural dry surface on Earth. These observations suggested that surface winds in the area were minimal at the time or that the lake's liquid was more viscous than expected.

On July 8, 2009, Cassini's Visual and Infrared Mapping Spectrometer detected a specular reflection in 5 μm infrared light from a body of liquid in the northern hemisphere at 71° N, 337° W. The feature was initially identified as being near the southern shoreline of Kraken Mare, but combined radar and VIMS observations later showed that it was a separate lake, subsequently named Jingpo Lacus. The observation occurred shortly after the northern polar region emerged from 15 years of winter darkness. Because the liquid body was near the pole, the observation required a phase angle close to 180 degrees.

Despite Titan's arid equatorial conditions, Cassini observed only one equatorial rainstorm between 2004 and 2012. Several long-lived tropical hydrocarbon lakes were unexpectedly discovered in 2012. One, near the Huygens landing site in the Shangri-La region, is about half the size of Utah's Great Salt Lake and at least 1 m (3.3 ft) deep. Underground aquifers are a possible source of these lakes, suggesting that the arid equatorial regions may contain localized reservoirs of liquid hydrocarbons.

== Composition and surface properties ==
According to Cassini data, scientists announced on February 13, 2008, that Titan hosts within its polar lakes "hundreds of times more natural gas and other liquid hydrocarbons than all the known oil and natural gas reserves on Earth." The desert sand dunes along the equator, while devoid of open liquid, nonetheless hold more organics than all of Earth's coal reserves. It has been estimated that the visible lakes and seas of Titan contain about 300 times the volume of Earth's proven oil reserves. In June 2008, Cassini's Visible and Infrared Mapping Spectrometer confirmed the presence of liquid ethane beyond doubt in a lake in Titan's southern hemisphere. The exact blend of hydrocarbons in the lakes is unknown. According to a computer model, 3/4 of an average polar lake is ethane, with 10 percent methane, 7 percent propane and smaller amounts of hydrogen cyanide, butane, nitrogen and argon. Benzene is expected to fall like snow and quickly dissolve into the lakes, although the lakes may become saturated just as the Dead Sea on Earth is packed with salt. The excess benzene would then build up in a mud-like sludge on the shores and on the lake floors before eventually being eroded by ethane rain, forming a complex cave-riddled landscape. Salt-like compounds composed of ammonia and acetylene are also predicted to form. However, the chemical composition and physical properties of the lakes probably varies from one lake to another (Cassini observations in 2013 indicate Ligeia Mare is filled with a ternary mixture of methane, ethane, and nitrogen and consequently the probe's radar signals were able to detect the sea floor 170 m [560 ft] below the liquid surface).

No waves were initially detected by Cassini as the northern lakes emerged from winter darkness (calculations indicate wind speeds of less than 1 meter per second [2.2 mph] should whip up detectable waves in Titan's ethane lakes but none were observed). This may be either due to low seasonal winds or solidification of hydrocarbons. Titan has several lakes that reside near its northern pole that vary in size, the area these lakes cover and lower wind speeds could as well explain why there were no surface waves being detected. The area over a liquid that wind blows across is known as fetch. The larger this area is, the larger waves become as wind has more area to blow across to transfer energy. The smaller the area of fetch, the smaller waves will be. The optical properties of solid methane surface (close to the melting point) are quite close to the properties of liquid surface however the viscosity of solid methane, even near the melting point, is many orders of magnitude higher, which might explain extraordinary smoothness of the surface. Solid methane is denser than liquid methane so it will eventually sink. It is possible that the methane ice could float for a time as it probably contains bubbles of nitrogen gas from Titan's atmosphere. Temperatures close to the freezing point of methane (90.4 K; −182.8 °C; −296.9 °F) could lead to both floating and sinking ice - that is, a hydrocarbon ice crust above the liquid and blocks of hydrocarbon ice on the bottom of the lake bed. The ice is predicted to rise to the surface again at the onset of spring before melting.

Since 2014, Cassini has detected transient features in scattered patches in Kraken Mare, Ligeia Mare and Punga Mare. Laboratory experiments suggest these features (e.g. RADAR-bright "magic islands") might be vast patches of bubbles caused by the rapid release of nitrogen dissolved in the lakes. Bubble outburst events are predicted to occur as the lakes cool and subsequently warm or whenever methane-rich fluids mix with ethane-rich ones due to heavy rainfall. Bubble outburst events may also influence the formation of Titan's river deltas. An alternative explanation is the transient features in Cassini VIMS near-infrared data may be shallow, wind-driven capillary waves (ripples) moving at about 0.7 m/s (1.6 mph) and at heights of about 1.5 centimeters (0.59 in). Post-Cassini analysis of VIMS data suggests tidal currents may also be responsible for the generation of persistent waves in narrow channels (Freta) of Kraken Mare.

Cyclones driven by evaporation and involving rain as well as gale-force winds of up to 20 m/s (72 km/h; 45 mph) are expected to form over the large northern seas only (Kraken Mare, Ligeia Mare, Punga Mare) in northern summer during 2017, lasting up to ten days. However, a 2017 analysis of Cassini data from 2007 to 2015 indicates waves across these three seas were diminutive, reaching only about 1 centimeter (0.39 in) high and 20 centimeters (7.9 in) long. The results call into question the early summer's classification as the beginning of the Titan's windy season, because high winds probably would have made for larger waves. A 2019 theoretical study concluded that it is possible that the relatively dense aerosols raining down on Titan's lakes may have liquid-repelling properties, forming a persistent film on the surface of the lakes which then would inhibit formation of waves larger than a few centimetres in wavelength.

== Methane cycle and lake formation ==
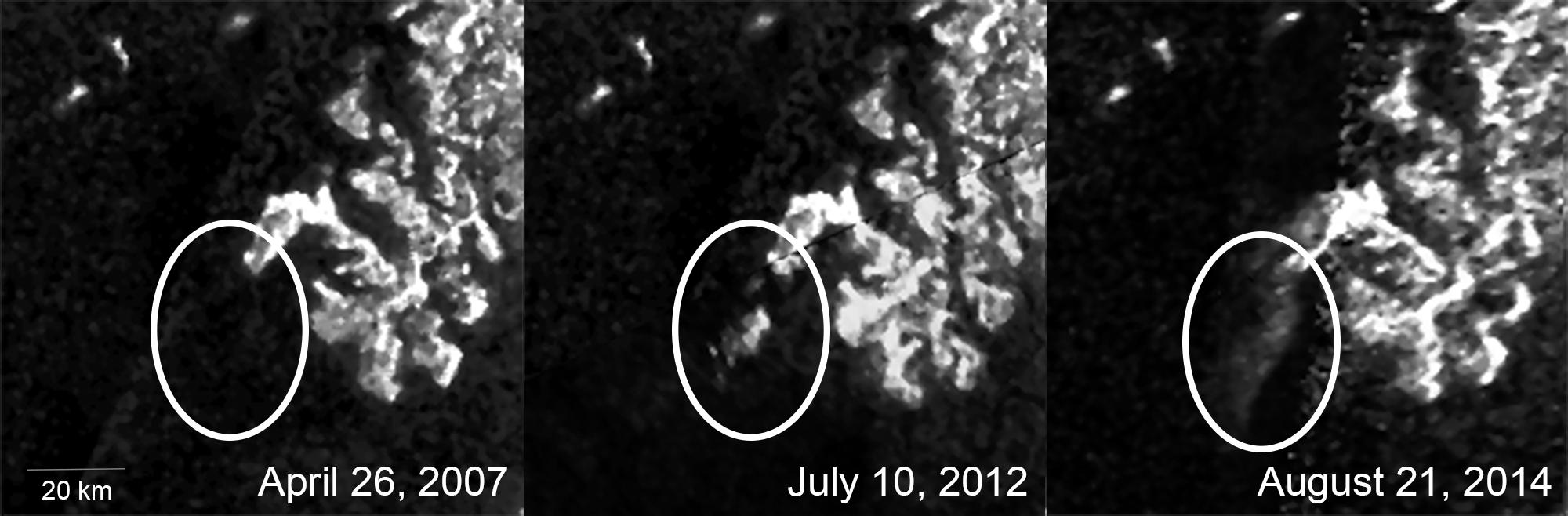
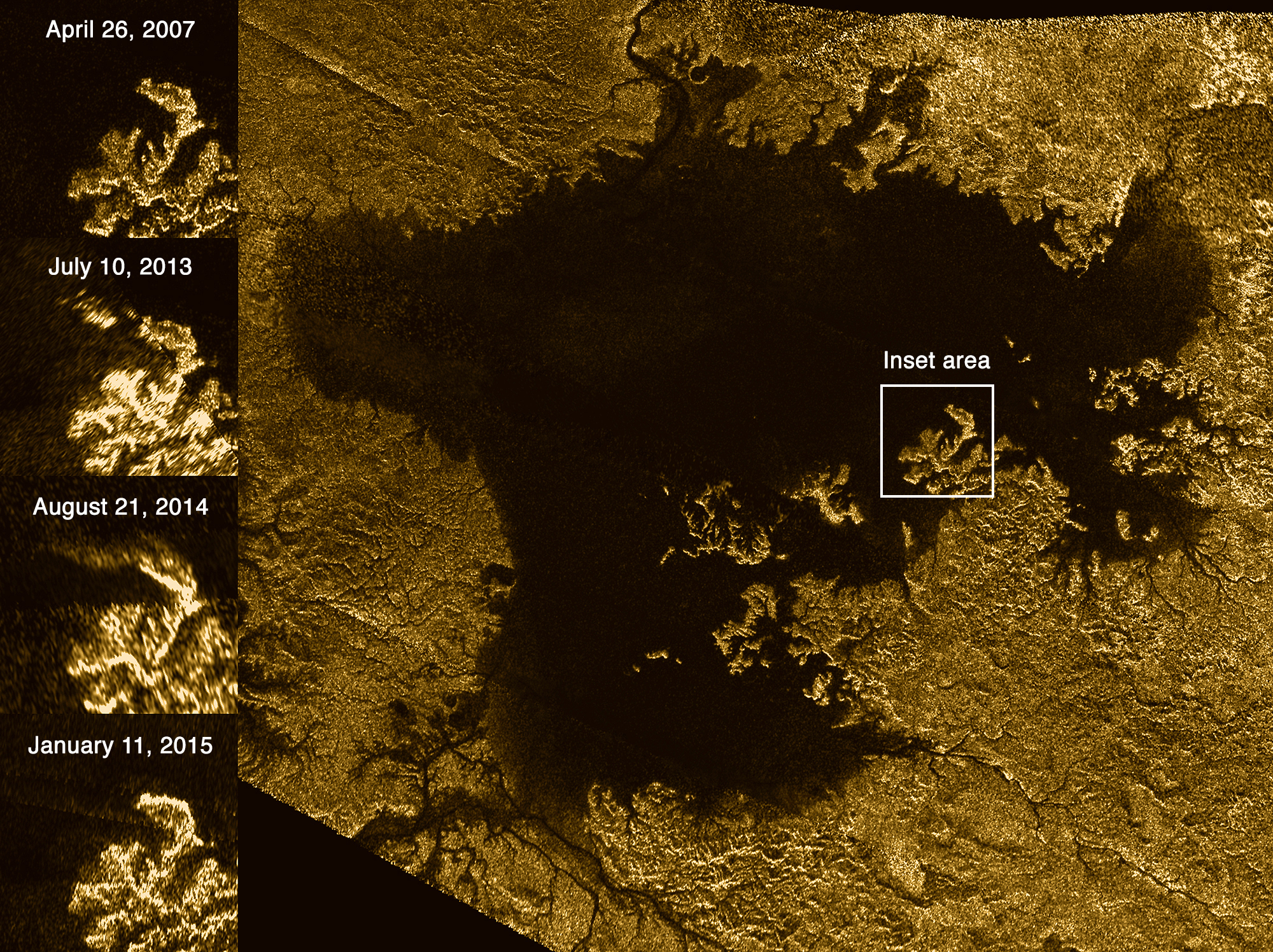
Evolving feature in Ligeia Mare

Models of oscillations in Titan's atmospheric circulation suggest that over the course of a Saturnian year, liquid is transported from the equatorial region to the poles, where it falls as rain. This might account for the equatorial region's relative dryness. According to a computer model, intense rainstorms should occur in normally rainless equatorial areas during Titan's vernal and autumnal equinoxes—enough liquid to carve out the type of channels that Huygens found. The model also predicts energy from the Sun will evaporate liquid methane from Titan's surface except at the poles, where the relative absence of sunlight makes it easier for liquid methane to accumulate into permanent lakes. The model also apparently explains why there are more lakes in the northern hemisphere. Due to the eccentricity of Saturn's orbit, the northern summer is longer than the southern summer and consequently the rainy season is longer in the north.

However, recent Cassini observations (from 2013) suggest geology may also explain the geographic distribution of the lakes and other surface features. One puzzling feature of Titan is the lack of impact craters at the poles and mid-latitudes, particularly at lower elevations. These areas may be wetlands fed by subsurface ethane and methane springs. Any crater created by meteorites is thus quickly subsumed by wet sediment. The presence of underground aquifers could explain another mystery. Titan's atmosphere is full of methane, which according to calculations should react with ultraviolet radiation from the sun to produce liquid ethane. Over time, the moon should have built up an ethane ocean hundreds of meters (1,500 to 2,500 feet) deep instead of only a handful of polar lakes. The presence of wetlands would suggest that the ethane soaks into the ground, forming a subsurface liquid layer akin to groundwater on Earth. A possibility is that the formation of materials called clathrates changes the chemical composition of the rainfall runoff that charges the subsurface hydrocarbon "aquifers." This process leads to the formation of reservoirs of propane and ethane that may feed into some rivers and lakes. The chemical transformations taking place underground would affect Titan's surface. Lakes and rivers fed by springs from propane or ethane subsurface reservoirs would show the same kind of composition, whereas those fed by rainfall would be different and contain a significant fraction of methane.

97% of Titan's lakes have been found within a bright unit of terrain covering about 900 by 1,800 kilometers (560 by 1,120 mi) near the north pole. The lakes found here have very distinctive shapes—rounded complex silhouettes and steep sides—suggesting deformation of the crust created fissures that could be filled up with liquid. A variety of formation mechanisms have been proposed. The explanations range from the collapse of land after a cryovolcanic eruption to karst terrain, where liquids dissolve soluble ice. Smaller lakes (up to tens of miles across) with steep rims (up to hundreds of feet high) might be analogous to maar lakes, i.e. explosion craters subsequently filled with liquid. The explosions are proposed to result from fluctuations in climate, which lead to pockets of liquid nitrogen accumulating within the crust during colder periods and then exploding when warming caused the nitrogen to rapidly expand as it shifted to a gas state.

== Titan Mare Explorer ==
Titan Mare Explorer (TiME) was a proposed NASA/ESA lander that would splash down on Ligeia Mare and analyze its surface, shoreline and Titan's atmosphere. However, it was turned down in August 2012, when NASA instead selected the InSight mission to Mars.

== Named lakes, seas, and rivers ==
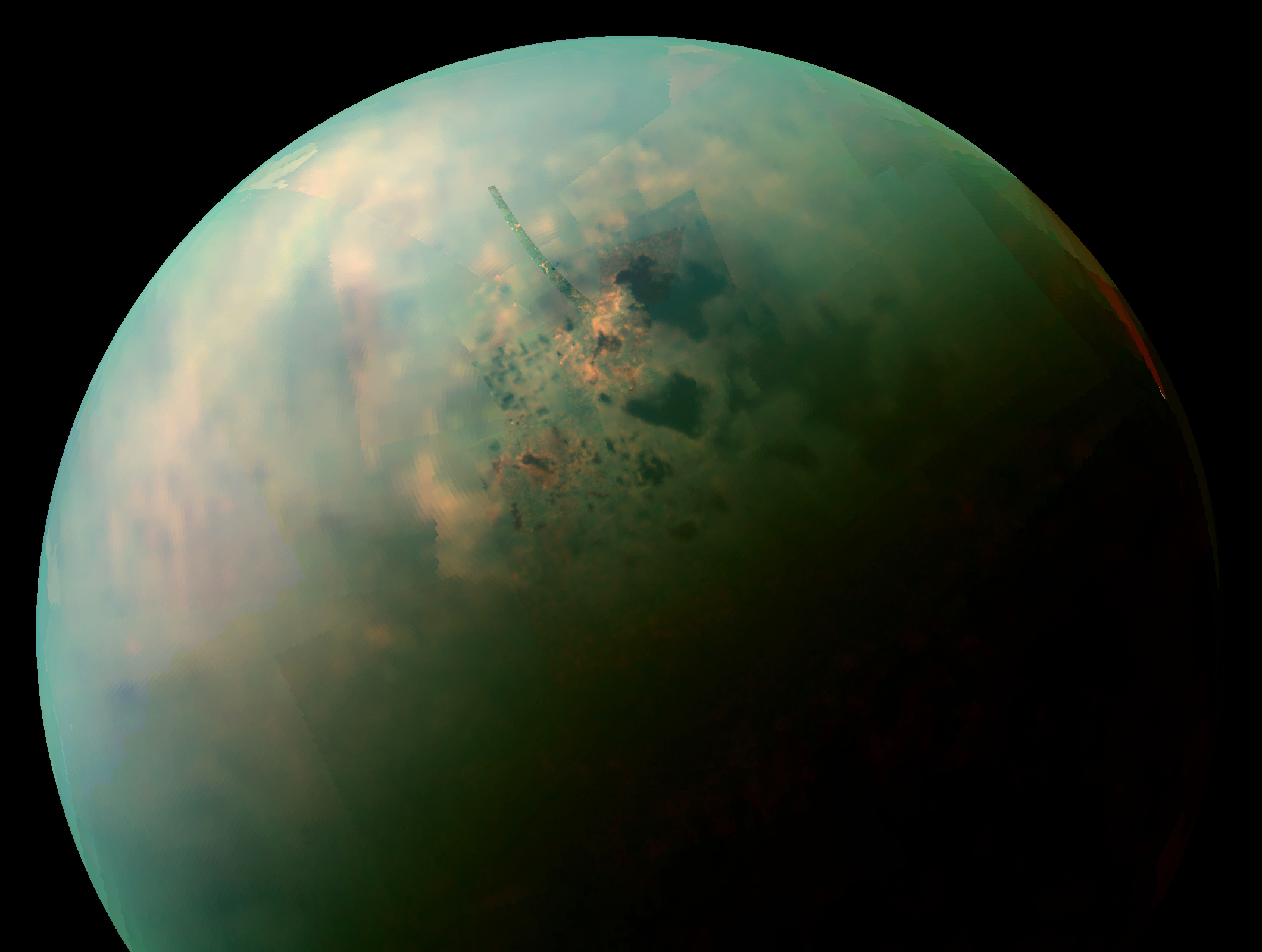
False-color near infrared view of Titan's northern hemisphere, showing its seas and lakes. Orange areas near some of them may be deposits of organic evaporite left behind by receding liquid hydrocarbon.

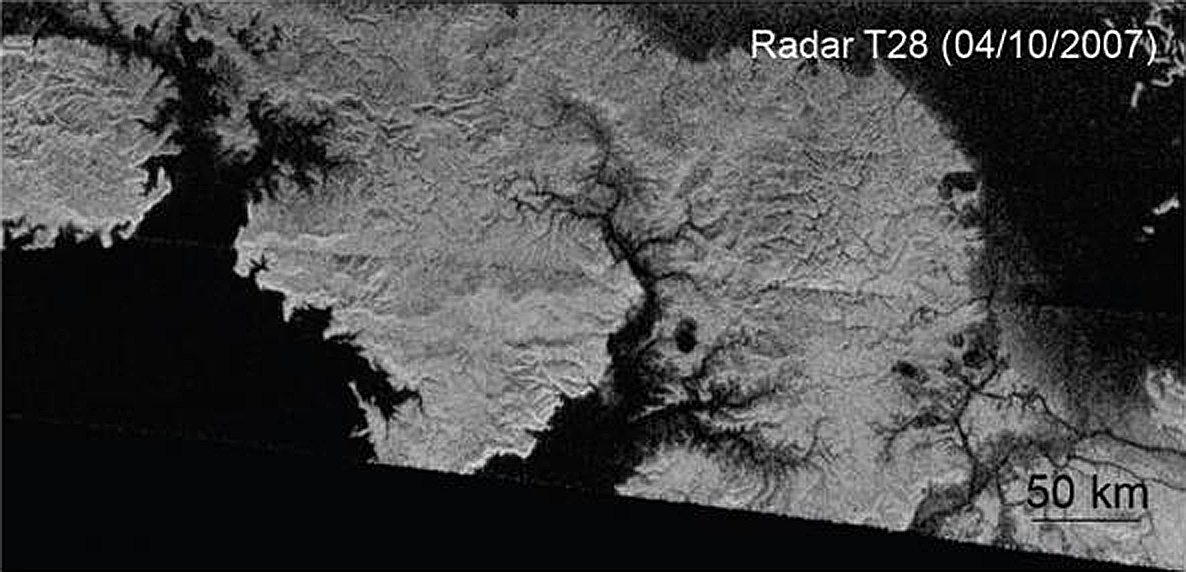
Intricate networks of channels drain into Kraken Mare (lower left) and Ligeia Mare (upper right).

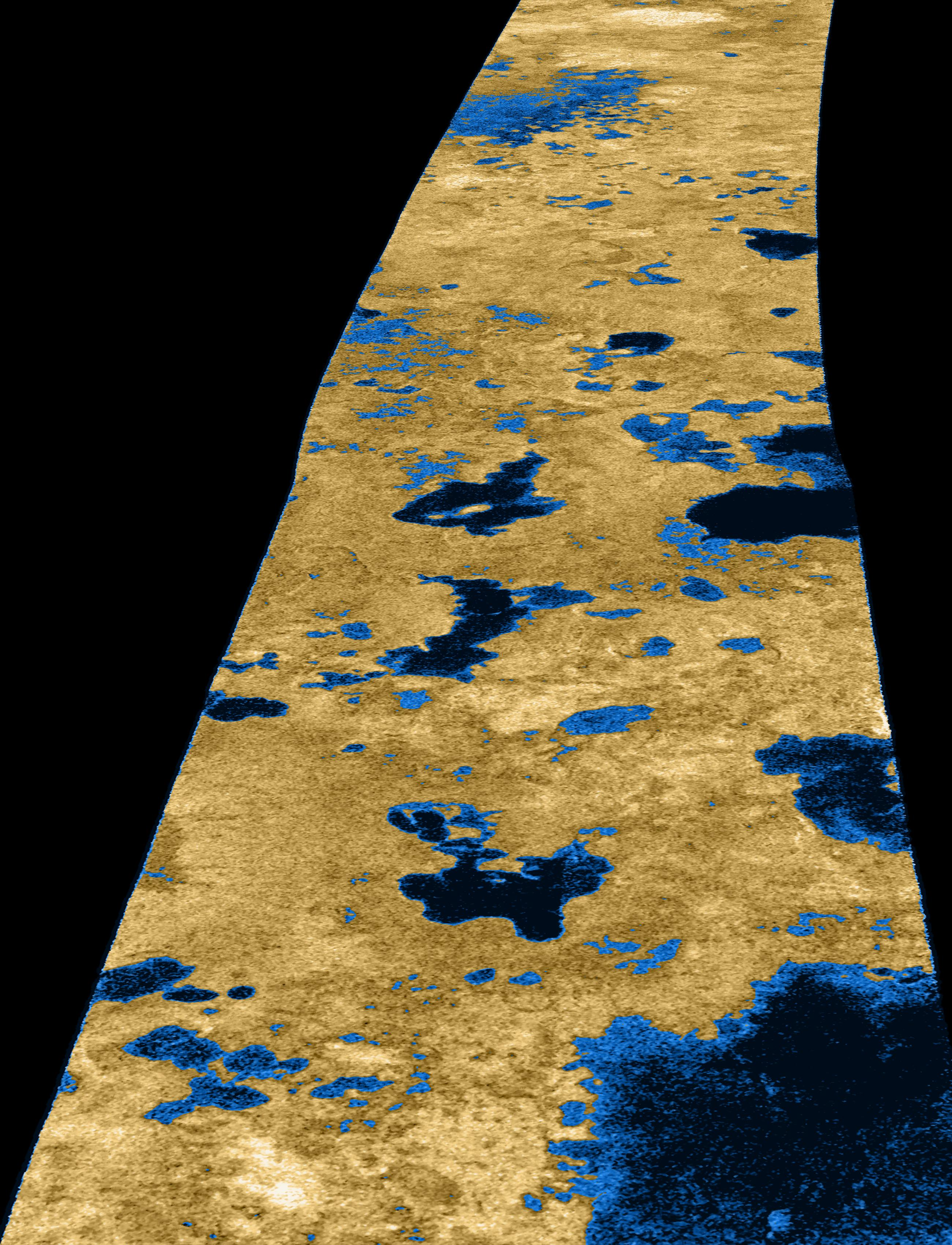
Hydrocarbon lakes on Titan: Cassini radar image, 2006. Bolsena Lacus is at lower right, with Sotonera Lacus just above and to its left. Koitere Lacus and Neagh Lacus are in the middle distance, left of center and on the right margin, respectively. Mackay Lacus is at upper left.

Features labeled lacus are believed to be ethane/methane lakes, while features labeled lacuna are believed to be dry lake beds. Both are named after lakes on Earth.

Features labeled sinus are bays within the lakes or seas. They are named after bays and fjords on Earth. Features labeled insula are islands within the body of liquid. They are named after mythical islands. Titanean maria (large hydrocarbon seas) are named after sea monsters in world mythology. The tables are up-to-date as of 2023.

=== Sea names of Titan ===
Name	Coordinates	Length (km) (Note: The USGS web site gives size as a "diameter", but it is actually the length in the longest dimension.)	Area (km^{2})	Approval Date	Source of name	Ref
Kraken Mare	68.0°N 310.0°W	1,170	400,000	11 April 2008	The Kraken, Norse sea monster.	WGPSN
Ligeia Mare	79.0°N 248.0°W	500	126,000	11 April 2008	Ligeia, one of the Sirens, Greek monsters	WGPSN
Punga Mare	85.1°N 339.7°W	380	40,000	14 November 2008	Punga, Māori ancestor of sharks and lizards	WGPSN

=== Lake names of Titan ===
Name	Coordinates	Length (km)	Approval Date	Source of name	Ref
Abaya Lacus	73.17°N 45.55°W	65	27 September 2007	Lake Abaya, Ethiopia	WGPSN
Akmena Lacus	85.1°N 55.6°W	35.6	7 August 2017	Lake Akmena, Lithuania	WGPSN
Albano Lacus	65.9°N 236.4°W	6.2	16 September 2010	Lake Albano, Italy	WGPSN
Annecy Lacus	76.8°N 128.9°W	20	26 June 2017	Lake Annecy, France	WGPSN
Arala Lacus	78.1°N 124.9°W	12.3	26 June 2017	Lake Arala, Mali	WGPSN
Atitlán Lacus	69.3°N 238.8°W	13.7	16 September 2010	Lake Atitlán, Guatemala	WGPSN
Balaton Lacus	82.9°N 87.5°W	35.6	7 August 2017	Lake Balaton, Hungary	WGPSN
Bolsena Lacus	75.75°N 10.28°W	101	27 September 2007	Lake Bolsena, Italy	WGPSN
Brienz Lacus	85.3°N 43.8°W	50.6	7 August 2017	Lake Brienz, Switzerland	WGPSN
Buada Lacus	76.4°N 129.6°W	76.4	26 June 2017	Buada Lagoon, Nauru	WGPSN
Cardiel Lacus	70.2°N 206.5°W	22	7 April 2011	Cardiel Lake, Argentina	WGPSN
Cayuga Lacus	69.8°N 230.0°W	22.7	16 September 2010	Cayuga Lake, USA	WGPSN
Chilwa Lacus	75°N 131.3°W	19.8	6 June 2017	Lake Chilwa, near Malawi-Mozambique border	WGPSN
Crveno Lacus	79.6°S 184.9°W	41.0	20 July 2015	Crveno Jezero, Croatia	WGPSN
Dilolo Lacus	76.2°N 125°W	18.3	26 June 2017	Dilolo Lake, Angola	WGPSN
Dridzis Lacus	78.9°N 131.3°W	50	26 June 2017	Lake Dridzis, Latvia	WGPSN
Enriquillo Lacus	71.4°N 237.59°W	47	13 April 2022	Lake Enriquillo, Dominican Republic	WGPSN
Feia Lacus	73.7°N 64.41°W	47	27 September 2007	Lake Feia, Brazil	WGPSN
Fogo Lacus	81.9°N 98°W	32.3	7 August 2017	Lagoa do Fogo, Azores, Portugal	WGPSN
Freeman Lacus	73.6°N 211.1°W	26	7 April 2011	Lake Freeman, USA	WGPSN
Gatun Lacus	72.79°N 178.04°W	67	13 April 2022	Gatun Lake, Panama	WGPSN
Grasmere Lacus	72.3°N 103.1°W	33.3	7 August 2017	Grasmere Lake, England	WGPSN
Hammar Lacus	48.6°N 308.29°W	200	3 December 2013	Lake Hammar, Iraq	WGPSN
Hlawga Lacus	76.6°N 103.6°W	40.3	7 August 2017	Lake Hlawga, Myanmar	WGPSN
Ihotry Lacus	76.1°N 137.2°W	37.5	6 June 2017	Lake Ihotry, Madagascar	WGPSN
Imogene Lacus	71.1°N 111.8°W	38	26 June 2017	Imogene Lake, USA	WGPSN
Jingpo Lacus	73.0°N 336.0°W	240	29 March 2010	Jingpo Lake, China	WGPSN
Junín Lacus	66.9°N 236.9°W	6.3	16 September 2010	Lake Junín, Peru	WGPSN
Karakul Lacus	86.3°N 56.6°W	18.4	7 August 2017	Lake Karakul, Tajikistan	WGPSN
Kayangan Lacus	86.3°S 236.9°W	6.2	27 December 2015	Kayangan Lake, Philippines	WGPSN
Kivu Lacus	87.0°N 121.0°W	77.5	14 November 2008	Lake Kivu, on the border of Rwanda and the Democratic Republic of the Congo	WGPSN
Koitere Lacus	79.4°N 36.14°W	68	27 September 2007	Koitere, Finland	WGPSN
Ladoga Lacus	74.8°N 26.1°W	110	24 May 2013	Lake Ladoga, Russia	WGPSN
Lagdo Lacus	75.5°N 125.7°W	37.8	26 June 2017	Lagdo Reservoir, Cameroon	WGPSN
Lanao Lacus	71.0°N 217.7°W	34.5	16 September 2010	Lake Lanao, Philippines	WGPSN
Letas Lacus	81.3°N 88.2°W	23.7	7 August 2017	Lake Letas, Vanuatu	WGPSN
Logtak Lacus	70.8°N 124.1°W	14.3	16 September 2010	Loktak Lake, India	WGPSN
Mackay Lacus	78.32°N 97.53°W	180	27 September 2007	Lake Mackay, Australia	WGPSN
Maracaibo Lacus	75.3°N 127.7°W	20.4	6 June 2017	Lake Maracaibo, Venezuela	WGPSN
Müggel Lacus	84.44°N 203.5°W	170	3 December 2013	Müggelsee, Germany	WGPSN
Muzhwi Lacus	74.8°N 126.3°W	36	6 June 2017	Muzhwi Dam, Zimbabwe	WGPSN
Mweru Lacus	71.9°N 131.8°W	20.6	6 June 2017	Lake Mweru, on Zambia-Democratic Republic of the Congo border	WGPSN
Mývatn Lacus	78.19°N 135.28°W	55	27 September 2007	Mývatn, Iceland	WGPSN
Neagh Lacus	81.11°N 32.16°W	98	27 September 2007	Lough Neagh, Northern Ireland	WGPSN
Negra Lacus	75.5°N 128.9°W	15.3	6 June 2017	Lake Negra, Uruguay	WGPSN
Ohrid Lacus	71.8°N 221.9°W	17.3	16 September 2010	Lake Ohrid, on the border of North Macedonia and Albania	WGPSN
Olomega Lacus	78.7°N 122.2°W	15.7	26 June 2017	Lake Olomega, El Salvador	WGPSN
Oneida Lacus	76.14°N 131.83°W	51	27 September 2007	Oneida Lake, United States	WGPSN
Ontario Lacus	72.0°S 183.0°W	235	2006	Lake Ontario, on the border between Canada and the United States.	WGPSN
Phewa Lacus	72.2°N 124°W	12	6 June 2017	Phewa Lake, Nepal	WGPSN
Pielinen Lacus	71.34°N 179.66°W	88	13 April 2022	Pielinen, Finland	WGPSN
Prespa Lacus	73.1°N 135.7°W	43.7	6 June 2017	Lake Prespa, on tripoint of North Macedonia, Albania and Greece	WGPSN
Qinghai Lacus	83.4°N 51.5°W	44.3	7 August 2017	Qinghai Lake, China	WGPSN
Quilotoa Lacus	80.3°N 120.1°W	11.8	26 June 2017	Quilotoa, Ecuador	WGPSN
Rannoch Lacus	74.2°N 129.3°W	63.5	6 June 2017	Loch Rannoch, Scotland	WGPSN
Roca Lacus	79.8°N 123.5°W	46	26 June 2017	Las Rocas Lake, Chile	WGPSN
Rukwa Lacus	74.8°N 134.8°W	36	6 June 2017	Lake Rukwa, Tanzania	WGPSN
Rwegura Lacus	71.5°N 105.2°W	21.7	26 June 2017	Rwegura Dam, Burundi	WGPSN
Sarygamysh Lacus	84.64°N 103.92°W	19	13 April 2022	Sarygamysh Lake in Turkmenistan and Uzbekistan	WGPSN
Sevan Lacus	69.7°N 225.6°W	46.9	16 September 2010	Lake Sevan, Armenia	WGPSN
Shoji Lacus	79.7°S 166.4°W	5.8	27 December 2015	Lake Shoji, Japan	WGPSN
Sionascaig Lacus	41.52°S 278.12°W	143.2	12 March 2013	Loch Sionascaig, Scotland	WGPSN
Sotonera Lacus	76.75°N 17.49°W	63	27 September 2007	Lake Sotonera, Spain	WGPSN
Sparrow Lacus	84.3°N 64.7°W	81.4	27 September 2007	Sparrow Lake, Canada	WGPSN
Suwa Lacus	74.1°N 135.2°W	12	6 June 2017	Lake Suwa, Japan	WGPSN
Synevyr Lacus	81°N 53.6°W	36	7 August 2017	Lake Synevyr, Ukraine	WGPSN
Taupo Lacus	72.7°N 132.6°W	27	6 June 2017	Lake Taupō, New Zealand	WGPSN
Tengiz Lacus	73.2°N 105.6°W	70	26 June 2017	Lake Tengiz, Kazakhstan	WGPSN
Toba Lacus	70.9°N 108.1°W	23.6	26 June 2017	Lake Toba, Indonesia	WGPSN
Totak Lacus	74.03°N 225.99°W	20	14 April 2022	Totak, Norway	WGPSN
Towada Lacus	71.4°N 244.2°W	24	7 April 2011	Lake Towada, Japan	WGPSN
Trichonida Lacus	81.3°N 65.3°W	31.5	7 August 2017	Lake Trichonida, Greece	WGPSN
Tsomgo Lacus	86.4°S 162.4°W	59	27 December 2015	Lake Tsomgo, India	WGPSN
Urmia Lacus	39.27°S 276.55°W	28.6	12 March 2013	Lake Urmia, Iran	WGPSN
Uvs Lacus	69.6°N 245.7°W	26.9	16 September 2010	Uvs Lake, Mongolia	WGPSN
Vänern Lacus	70.4°N 223.1°W	43.9	16 September 2010	Vänern, Sweden	WGPSN
Van Lacus	74.2°N 137.3°W	32.7	6 June 2017	Lake Van, Turkey	WGPSN
Viedma Lacus	72°N 125.7°W	42	6 June 2017	Viedma Lake, Argentina	WGPSN
Waikare Lacus	81.6°N 126.0°W	52.5	27 September 2007	Lake Waikare, New Zealand	WGPSN
Weija Lacus	68.77°N 327.68°W	12	12 March 2020	Lake Weija, Ghana	WGPSN
Winnipeg Lacus	78.05°N 153.31°W	60	26 February 2018	Lake Winnipeg, Canada	WGPSN
Xolotlán Lacus	82.3°N 72.9°W	57.4	7 August 2017	Lake Xolotlán, Nicaragua	WGPSN
Yessey Lacus	73°N 110.8°W	24.5	26 June 2017	Lake Yessey, Siberia, Russia	WGPSN
Yojoa Lacus	78.1°N 54.1°W	58.3	7 August 2017	Lake Yojoa, Honduras	WGPSN
Ypoa Lacus	73.4°N 132.2°W	39.2	6 June 2017	Lake Ypoá, Paraguay	WGPSN
Zaza Lacus	72.4°N 106.9°W	29	26 June 2017	Zaza Reservoir, Cuba	WGPSN
Zub Lacus	71.7°N 102.6°W	19.5	7 August 2017	Zub Lake, Antarctica	WGPSN

=== Lakebed names of Titan ===
Lacunae	Coordinates	Length (km)	Approval Date	Named after	Ref
Atacama Lacuna	68.2°N 227.6°W	35.9	21 December 2010	Salar de Atacama, intermittent lake in Chile	WGPSN
Cerknica Lacuna	71.12°N 175.56°W	96	13 April 2022	Lake Cerknica, intermittent lake in Slovenia	WGPSN
Eyre Lacuna	72.6°N 225.1°W	25.4	21 December 2010	Lake Eyre, an intermittent lake in Australia	WGPSN
Jerid Lacuna	66.7°N 221°W	42.6	21 December 2010	Chott el Djerid, intermittent lake in Tunisia	WGPSN
Kutch Lacuna	88.4°N 217°W	175	3 December 2013	Great Rann of Kutch, intermittent lake on Pakistani-Indian border	WGPSN
Melrhir Lacuna	64.9°N 212.6°W	23	21 December 2010	Chott Melrhir, intermittent lake in Algeria	WGPSN
Nakuru Lacuna	65.81°N 94°W	188	3 December 2013	Lake Nakuru, intermittent lake in Kenya	WGPSN
Ngami Lacuna	66.7°N 213.9°W	37.2	21 December 2010	Lake Ngami, in Botswana, and like its terrestrial namesake is considered to be endorheic.	WGPSN
Orog Lacuna	70.85°N 172.06°W	42	13 April 2022	Orog Lake, intermittent lake in Mongolia	WGPSN
Racetrack Lacuna	66.1°N 224.9°W	9.9	21 December 2010	Racetrack Playa, intermittent lake in California, USA	WGPSN
Uyuni Lacuna	66.3°N 228.4°W	27	21 December 2010	Salar de Uyuni, intermittent lake and world's largest salt flat in Bolivia	WGPSN
Veliko Lacuna	76.8°S 33.1°W	93	20 July 2015	Veliko Lake, intermittent lake in Bosnia-Herzegovina	WGPSN
Woytchugga Lacuna	68.88°N 109.0°W	449	3 December 2013	Lake Woytchugga, intermittent lake in Australia.	WGPSN

=== Bay names of Titan ===
Name	Coordinates	Liquid body	Length (km)	Approval Date	Source of name	Ref
Arnar Sinus	72.6°N 322°W	Kraken Mare	101	19 January 2015	Arnar, fjord in Iceland	WGPSN
Avacha Sinus	82.87°N 335.43°W	Punga Mare	51	12 March 2020	Avacha Bay in Kamchatka, Russia	WGPSN
Baffin Sinus	80.35°N 344.62°W	Kraken Mare	110	9 January 2018	Baffin Bay between Canada and Greenland	WGPSN
Boni Sinus	78.69°N 345.38°W	Kraken Mare	54	9 January 2018	Gulf of Boni in Indonesia	WGPSN
Dingle Sinus	81.36°N 336.44°W	Kraken Mare	80	9 January 2018	Dingle Bay in Ireland	WGPSN
Fagaloa Sinus	82.9°N 320.5°W	Punga Mare	33	14 December 2020	Fagaloa Bay in Upolu Island, Samoa	WGPSN
Flensborg Sinus	64.9°N 295.3°W	Kraken Mare	115	19 January 2015	Flensburg Firth, fjord between Denmark and Germany	WGPSN
Fundy Sinus	83.26°N 315.64°W	Punga Mare	91	12 March 2020	Bay of Fundy in Canada that hosts the world's largest tides	WGPSN
Gabes Sinus	67.6°N 289.6°W	Kraken Mare	147	19 January 2015	Gabes, or Syrtis minor, a bay in Tunisia	WGPSN
Genova Sinus	80.11°N 326.61°W	Kraken Mare	125	9 January 2018	Gulf of Genoa in Italy	WGPSN
Kumbaru Sinus	56.8°N 303.8°W	Kraken Mare	122	19 January 2015	Bay in India	WGPSN
Lulworth Sinus	67.19°N 316.88°W	Kraken Mare	24	12 March 2020	Lulworth Cove in southern England	WGPSN
Maizuru Sinus	78.9°N 352.53°W	Kraken Mare	92	9 January 2018	Maizuru Bay in Japan	WGPSN
Manza Sinus	79.29°N 346.1°W	Kraken Mare	37	9 January 2018	Manza Bay in Tanzania	WGPSN
Montego Sinus	80.76°N 130.92°W		83	13 April 2022	Montego Bay in Jamaica	WGPSN
Moray Sinus	76.6°N 281.4°W	Kraken Mare	204	19 January 2015	Moray Firth in Scotland	WGPSN
Nicoya Sinus	74.8°N 251.2°W	Ligeia Mare	130	19 January 2015	Gulf of Nicoya in Costa Rica	WGPSN
Okahu Sinus	73.7°N 282°W	Kraken Mare	141	19 January 2015	Okahu Bay near Auckland, New Zealand	WGPSN
Patos Sinus	77.2°N 224.8°W	Ligeia Mare	103	19 January 2015	Patos, fjord in Chile	WGPSN
Puget Sinus	82.4°N 241.1°W	Ligeia Mare	93	19 January 2015	Puget Sound in Washington, United States	WGPSN
Rombaken Sinus	75.3°N 232.9°W	Ligeia Mare	92.5	19 January 2015	Rombaken, fjord in Norway	WGPSN
Saldanha Sinus	82.42°N 322.5°W	Punga Mare	18	14 December 2020	Saldanha Bay in South Africa	WGPSN
Skelton Sinus	76.8°N 314.9°W	Kraken Mare	73	19 January 2015	Skelton Glacier near Ross Sea, Antarctica	WGPSN
Trold Sinus	71.3°N 292.7°W	Kraken Mare	118	19 January 2015	Trold Fiord Formation in Nunavut, Canada	WGPSN
Tumaco Sinus	82.55°N 315.22°W	Punga Mare	31	14 December 2020	Tumaco, port city and bay in Colombia	WGPSN
Tunu Sinus	79.2°N 299.8°W	Kraken Mare	134	19 January 2015	Tunu, fjord in Greenland	WGPSN
Wakasa Sinus	80.7°N 270°W	Ligeia Mare	146	19 January 2015	Wakasa Bay in Japan	WGPSN
Walvis Sinus	58.2°N 324.1°W	Kraken Mare	253	19 January 2015	Walvis Bay in Namibia	WGPSN

=== Island names of Titan ===
Insula	Coordinates	Liquid body	Diameter (km)	Approval Date	Named after	Ref
Bermoothes Insula	67.1°N 317.1°W	Kraken Mare	124	19 January 2015	Bermoothes, an enchanted island in Shakespeare's Tempest	WGPSN
Bimini Insula	73.3°N 305.4°W	Kraken Mare	39	19 January 2015	Bimini, island in Arawak legend said to contain the fountain of youth.	WGPSN
Bralgu Insula	76.2°N 251.5°W	Ligeia Mare	55	19 January 2015	Baralku, in Yolngu culture, the island of the dead and the place where the Djanggawul, the three creator siblings, originated.	WGPSN
Buyan Insula	77.3°N 245.1°W	Ligeia Mare	48	19 January 2015	Buyan, a rocky island in Russian folk tales located on the south shore of Baltic Sea	WGPSN
Hawaiki Insulae	84.32°N 327.07°W	Punga Mare	35	14 December 2020	Hawaiki, original home island of the Polynesian people in local mythology	WGPSN
Hufaidh Insulae	67°N 320.3°W	Kraken Mare	152	19 January 2015	Hufaidh, legendary island in the marshes of southern Iraq	WGPSN
Krocylea Insulae	69.1°N 302.4°W	Kraken Mare	74	19 January 2015	Crocylea, mythological Greek island in the Ionian Sea, near Ithaca	WGPSN
Mayda Insula	79.1°N 312.2°W	Kraken Mare	168	11 April 2008	Mayda, legendary island in the northeast Atlantic	WGPSN
Meropis Insula	83.85°N 313.68°W	Punga Mare	30	14 December 2020	Meropis, fictional island mentioned by ancient Greek writer Theopompus in his work Philippica	WGPSN
Onogoro Insula	83.28°N 311.7°W	Punga Mare	15	14 December 2020	Onogoro Island, Japanese mythological island	WGPSN
Penglai Insula	72.2°N 308.7°W	Kraken Mare	94	19 January 2015	Penglai, mythological Chinese mountain island where immortals and gods lived.	WGPSN
Planctae Insulae	77.5°N 251.3°W	Ligeia Mare	64	19 January 2015	Symplegades, the "clashing rocks" in Bosphorus which only Argo was said to have successfully passed.	WGPSN
Royllo Insula	68.3°N 297.2°W	Kraken Mare	103	19 January 2015	Royllo, legendary island in the Atlantic, on verge of unknown, near Antilla and Saint Brandan.	WGPSN

=== River names of Titan ===
Flumina	Coordinates	Liquid Body (Note: "Dry valleys" apply to rivers that are not directly connected to a known liquid body (Mare or lacus).)	Length (km)	Approval Date	Named after	Ref
Apanohuaya Flumen	84.29°N 297.24°W	Punga Mare	64	12 March 2020	Apanohuaya, mythological river in the Aztec Underworld	WGPSN
Celadon Flumina	73.7°S 28.8°W	dry valley	160	8 October 2014	Celadon, river in Homer's Iliad	WGPSN
Elivagar Flumina	19.3°N 78.5°W	dry valley	260	27 September 2007	The Élivágar, a group of ice rivers in Norse mythology	WGPSN
Gihon Flumen	76.81°N 215.55°W	Ligeia Mare	225	14 December 2020	Gihon, Biblical second river of paradise that flows from Eden	WGPSN
Hubur Flumen	70.2°S 192.9°W	Ontario Lacus	84	27 December 2015	Hubur, river of the underworld in Mesopotamian mythology	WGPSN
Karesos Flumen	70.9°S 194.8°W	Ontario Lacus	83	27 December 2015	River in Homer's Iliad	WGPSN
Kokytos Flumina	72.71°N 255°W	Ligeia Mare	305	14 December 2020	Cocytus, river of lamentations in the Greek underworld	WGPSN
Sambation Flumina	87.33°N 90.12°W	Punga Mare	210	14 December 2020	Sambation, legendary river in Jewish literature	WGPSN
Saraswati Flumen	74.6°S 193.5°W	Ontario Lacus	>300	27 December 2015	Saraswati, river in Hindu mythology	WGPSN
Vid Flumina	72.9°N 242.5°W	Ligeia Mare	400	13 February 2013	One of the rivers in Élivágar.	WGPSN
Xanthus Flumen	83.47°N 242.76°W	Ligeia Mare	78	6 November 2015	Name of the Gods of the river Skamandros in the Iliad.	WGPSN

== Image gallery ==
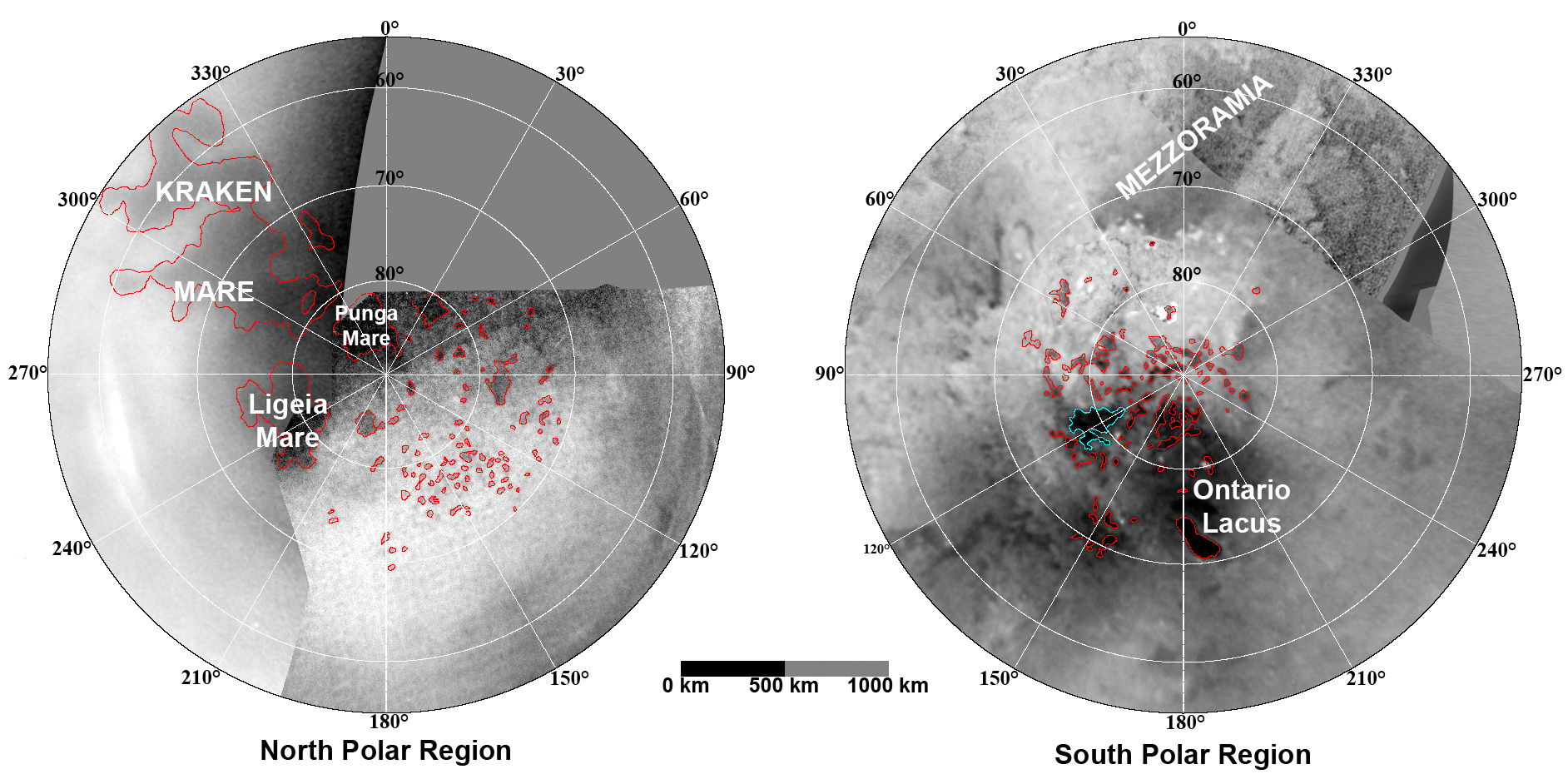
Maps of Titan's polar regions based on images from Cassini's ISS showing hydrocarbon lakes and seas. Bodies of liquid hydrocarbons are outlined in red; the blue outline indicates a body that appeared during the 2004-2005 interval.

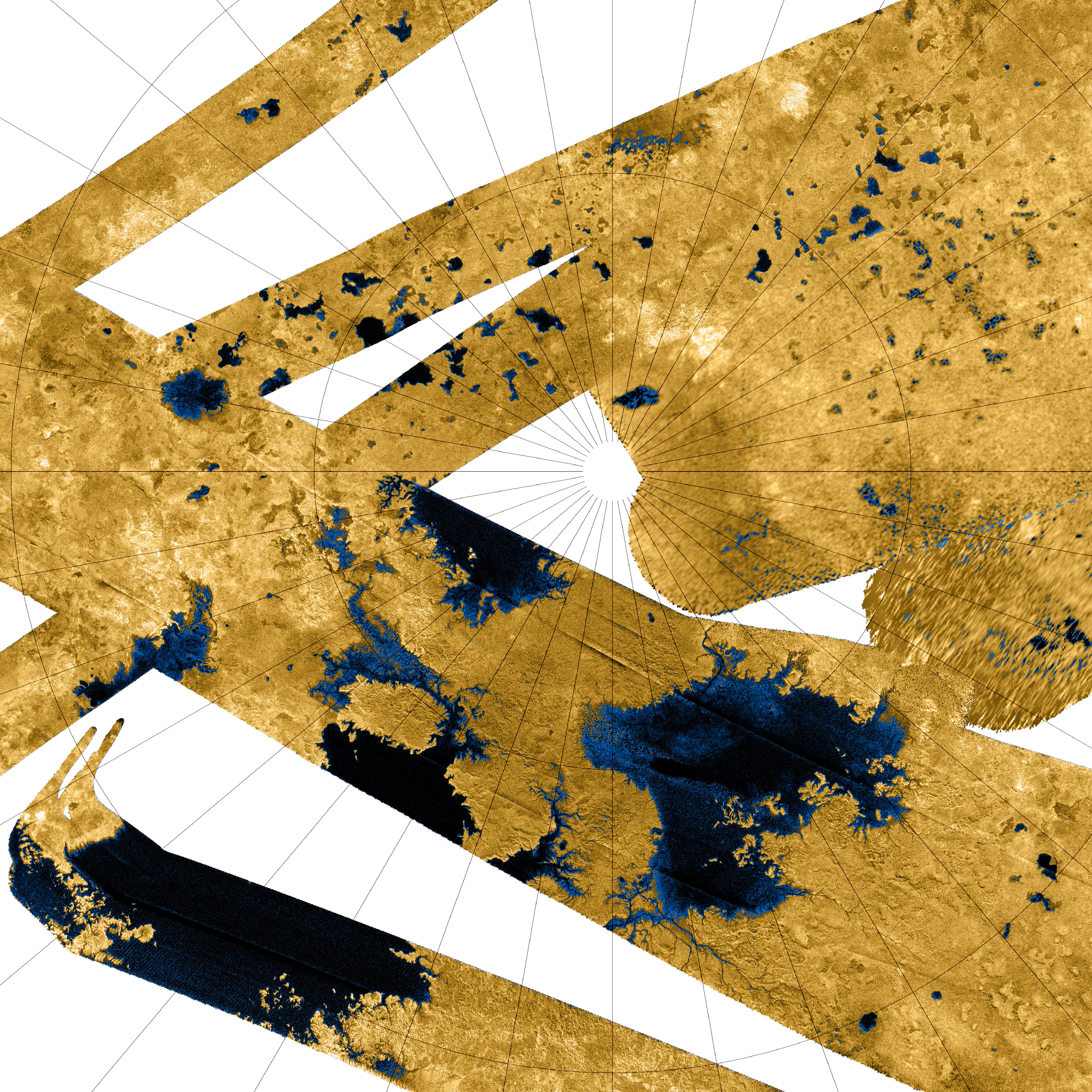
High-resolution false-color Cassini synthetic aperture radar mosaic of Titan's north polar region, showing hydrocarbon seas, lakes and tributary networks. Blue coloring indicates low radar reflectivity areas, caused by bodies of liquid ethane, methane and dissolved nitrogen. About half of Kraken Mare, the large body at lower left, is outside the image. Ligeia Mare is the large body at lower right. Punga Mare is just left of center. Jingpo Lacus is just above Kraken Mare, and Bolsena Lacus is directly above it.

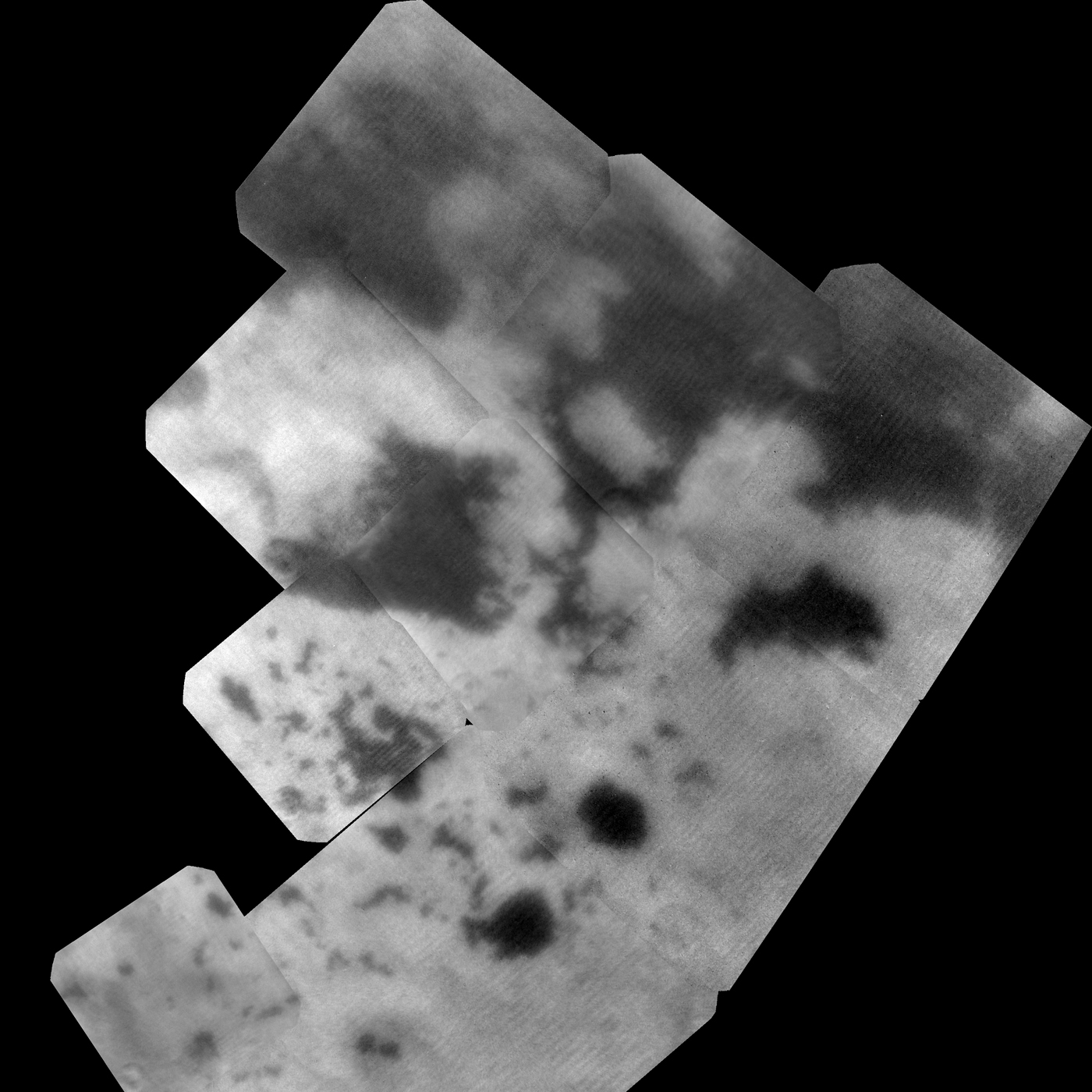
Cassini view of Titan's north polar seas and lakes in the near infrared. Ligeia Mare is at top; Punga Mare is below it and Kraken Mare is to its lower right.

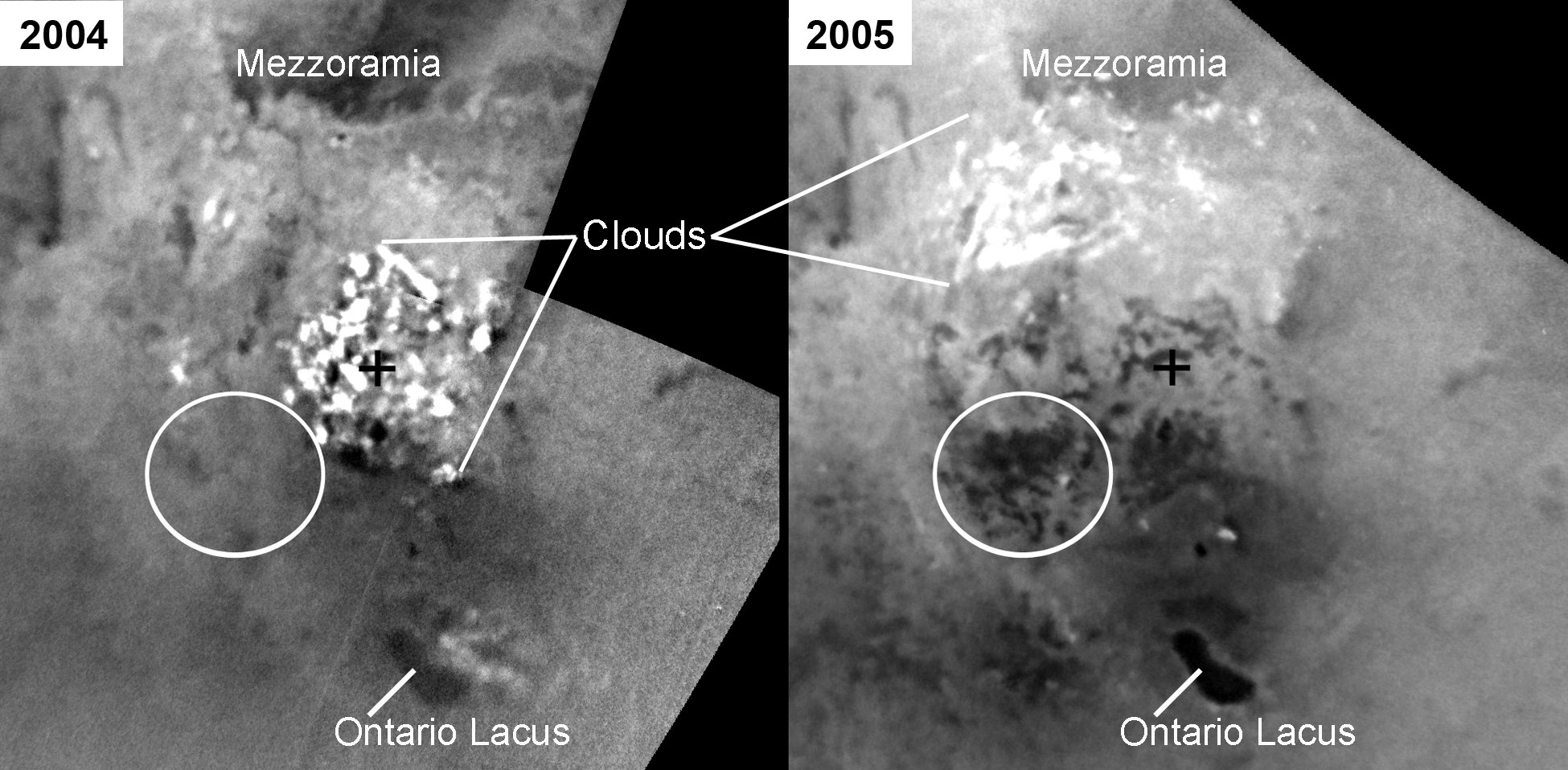
Between July 2004 and June 2005, new dark features appeared in Arrakis Planitia, a low plain in Titan's south polar region. These are interpreted as new bodies of liquid hydrocarbon resulting from precipitation from the clouds observed in the area in October 2004.

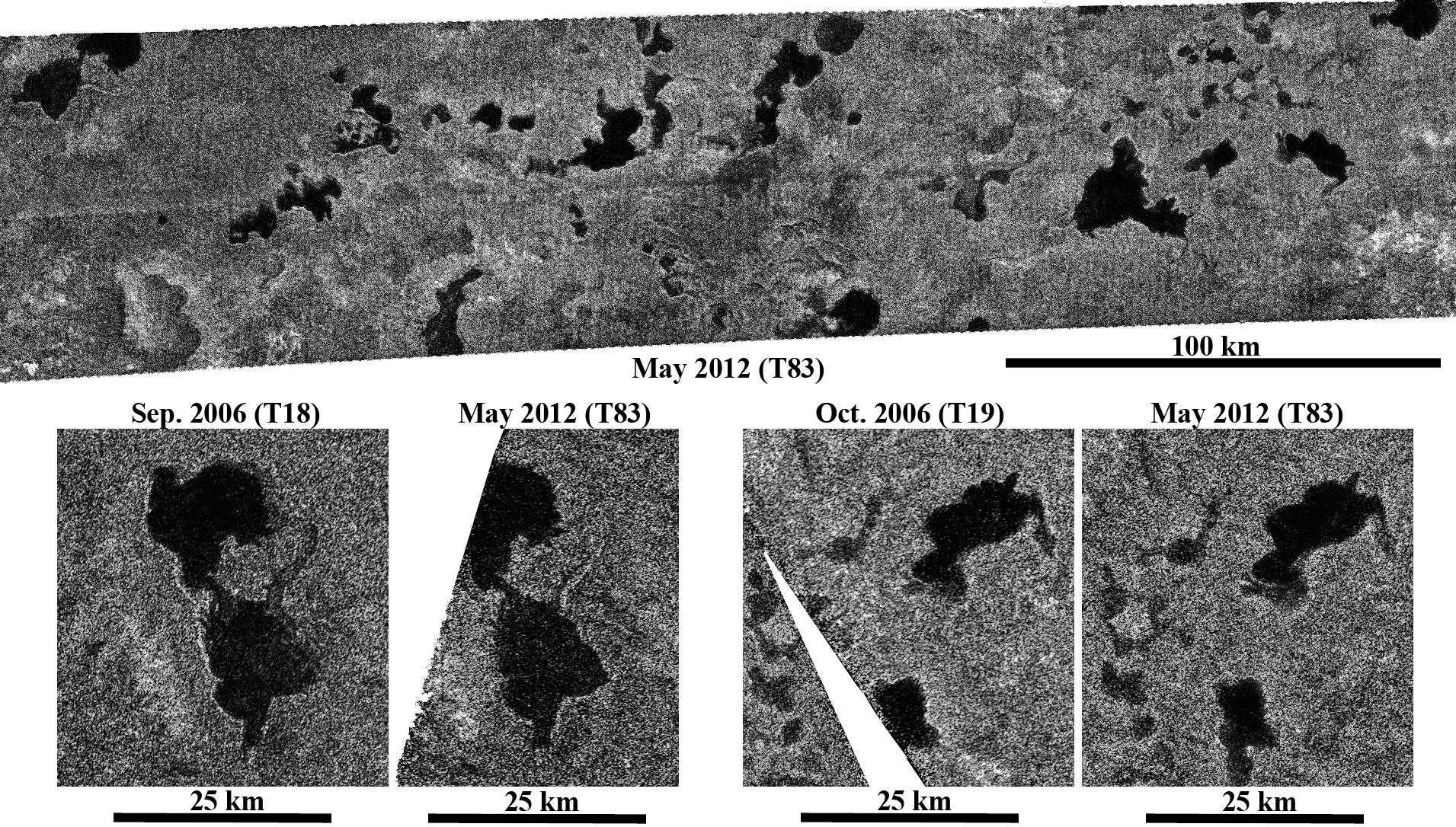
Titan's north polar lakes appear to have been stable for at least one Titanean season (seven Earth years).

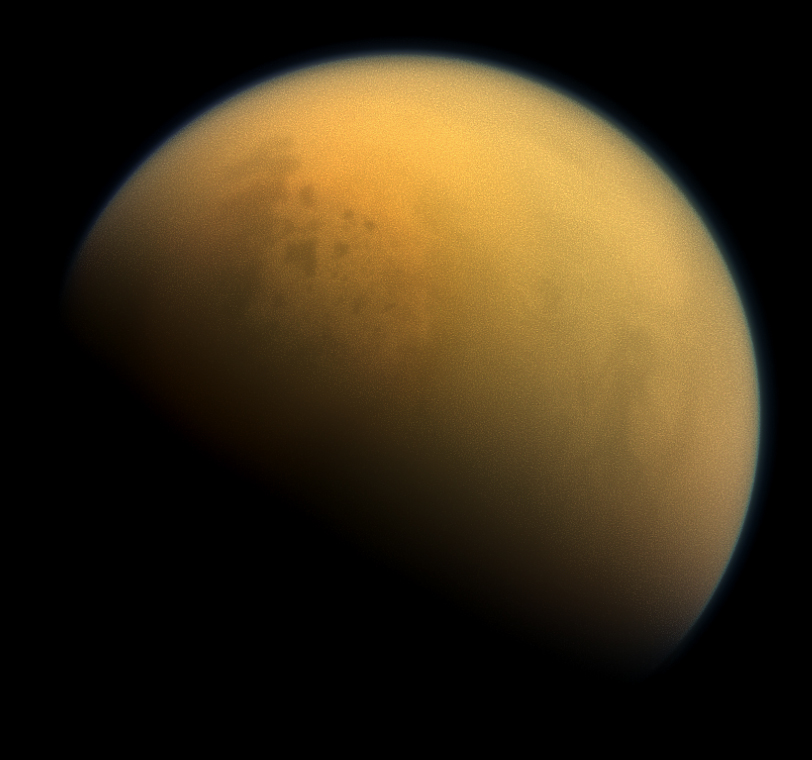
Natural color visible-near infrared view of Titan showing its north polar seas and lakes at upper left.

== See also ==
- Atmosphere of Titan – Gas layer surrounding the moon Titan
- Lakes on Mars – Former bodies of water on Mars
- List of largest lakes and seas in the Solar System
- Tar pit – Asphalt pit or asphalt lake
