= Mackay Lacus =

Lake on Titan

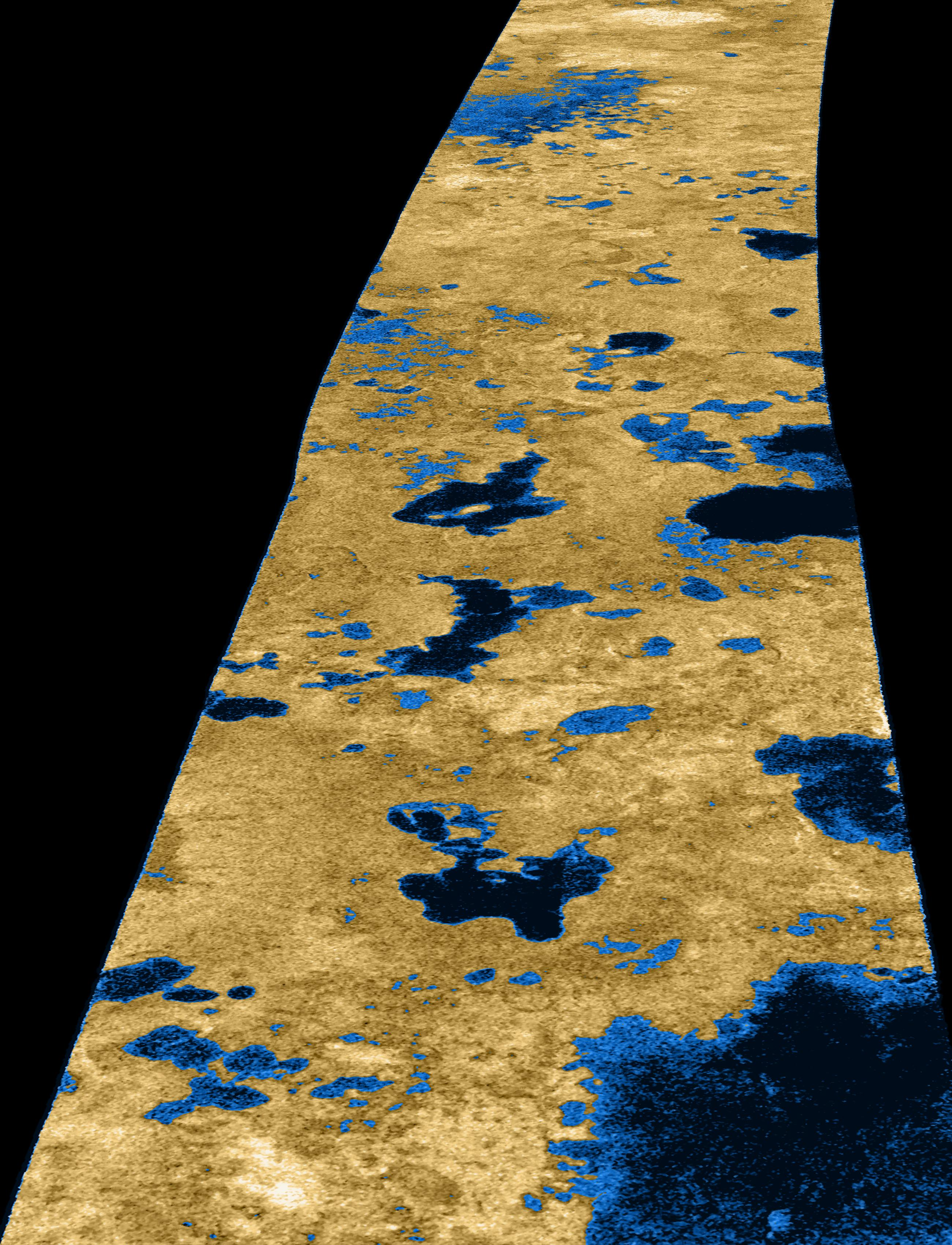
- False-color Cassini radar image of hydrocarbon lakes on Titan (2006), showing Mackay Lacus at upper left.
- Feature type: Lacus
- Coordinates: 78.32°N 97.53°W
- Diameter: 180 km (Note: The USGS web site gives the size as a "diameter", but it is actually the length in the longest dimension.)
- Eponym: Lake Mackay

Mackay Lacus is the seventh largest of a number of hydrocarbon seas and lakes found on Saturn's largest moon, Titan. The lake is composed of liquid methane and ethane, and was detected by the Cassini space probe.

Mackay Lacus is located at the coordinates 78.32°N and 97.53°W on Titan's globe and is 180 km in length. It is named after Lake Mackay in Western Australia.
