= Nakuru Lacuna =

Largest intermittent lake on Titan

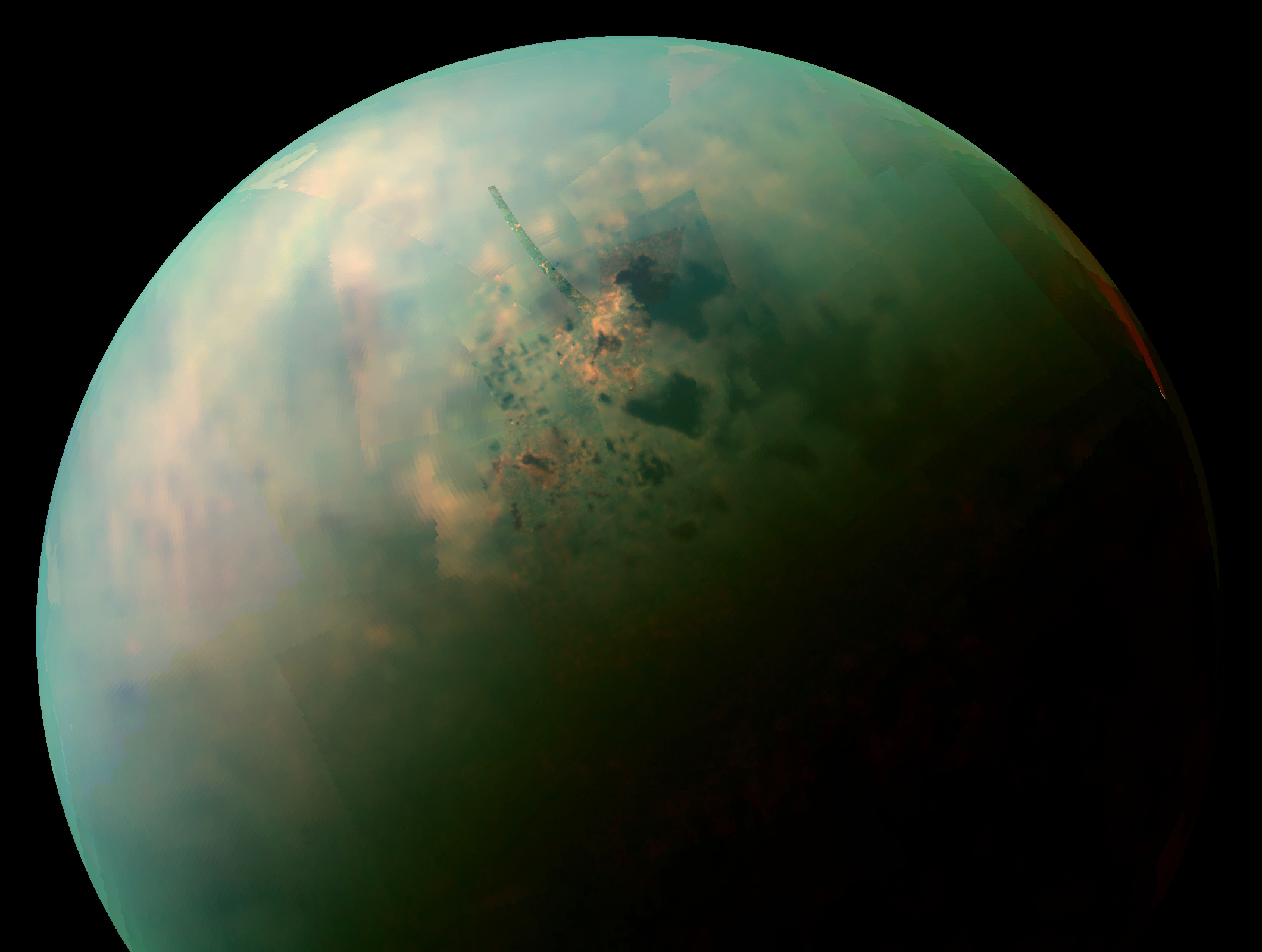
- Cassini view of Titan's north polar seas and lakes in the near infrared.
- Feature type: Lacus
- Coordinates: 65.81°N 94°W
- Diameter: 175 km

Nakuru Lacuna is the largest intermittent lake on Titan.

It is located at 65.81°N and 94°W on Titan's surface and is 175 km in length. The lake is composed of liquid ethane and methane, and was detected by the Cassini–Huygens space probe.

Indications are that it is an intermittent lake and so was named in 2013 after the Lake Nakuru, Kenya. It is the sixth largest body of liquid hydrocarbon on Titan.
