= Neagh Lacus =

Lake on Titan

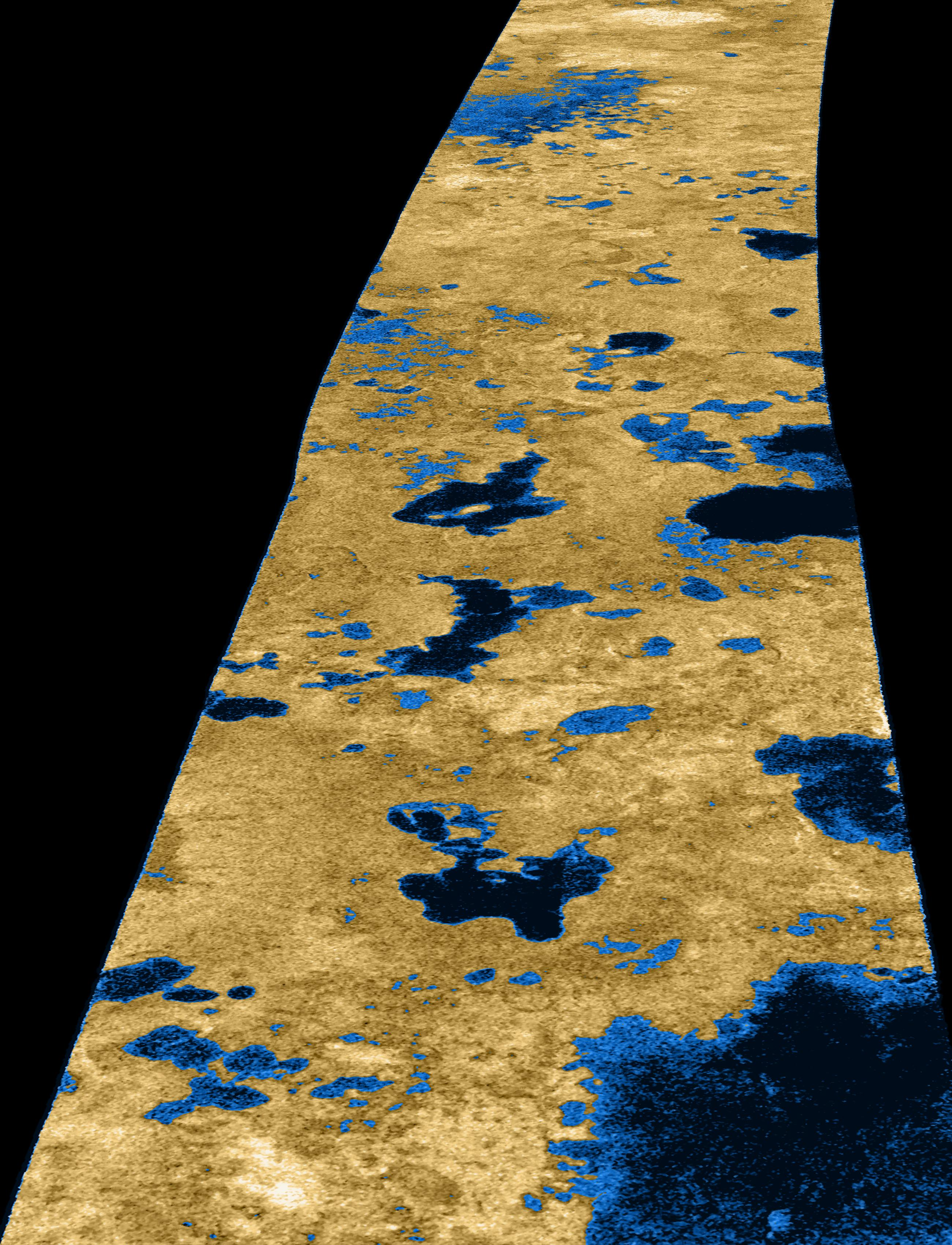
- False-color Cassini radar image of hydrocarbon lakes on Titan (2006), showing Neagh Lacus in the middle distance, on the right margin.
- Feature type: Lacus
- Coordinates: 81.11°N 32.16°W
- Diameter: 98 km (Note: The USGS web site gives the size as a "diameter", but it is actually the length in the longest dimension.)
- Eponym: Lake Neagh

Neagh Lacus is one of a number of hydrocarbon lakes found on Saturn's largest moon, Titan. The lake is composed of liquid methane and ethane, and was detected by the Cassini space probe.

The lacus is located at coordinates 81.11°N and 32.16°W on Titan's globe, in a region close to the north pole where most of Titan's lakes are located. The lake is 98 km in length and is named after Lough Neagh, in Northern Ireland.
