= Ngami Lacuna =

Lake on Titan

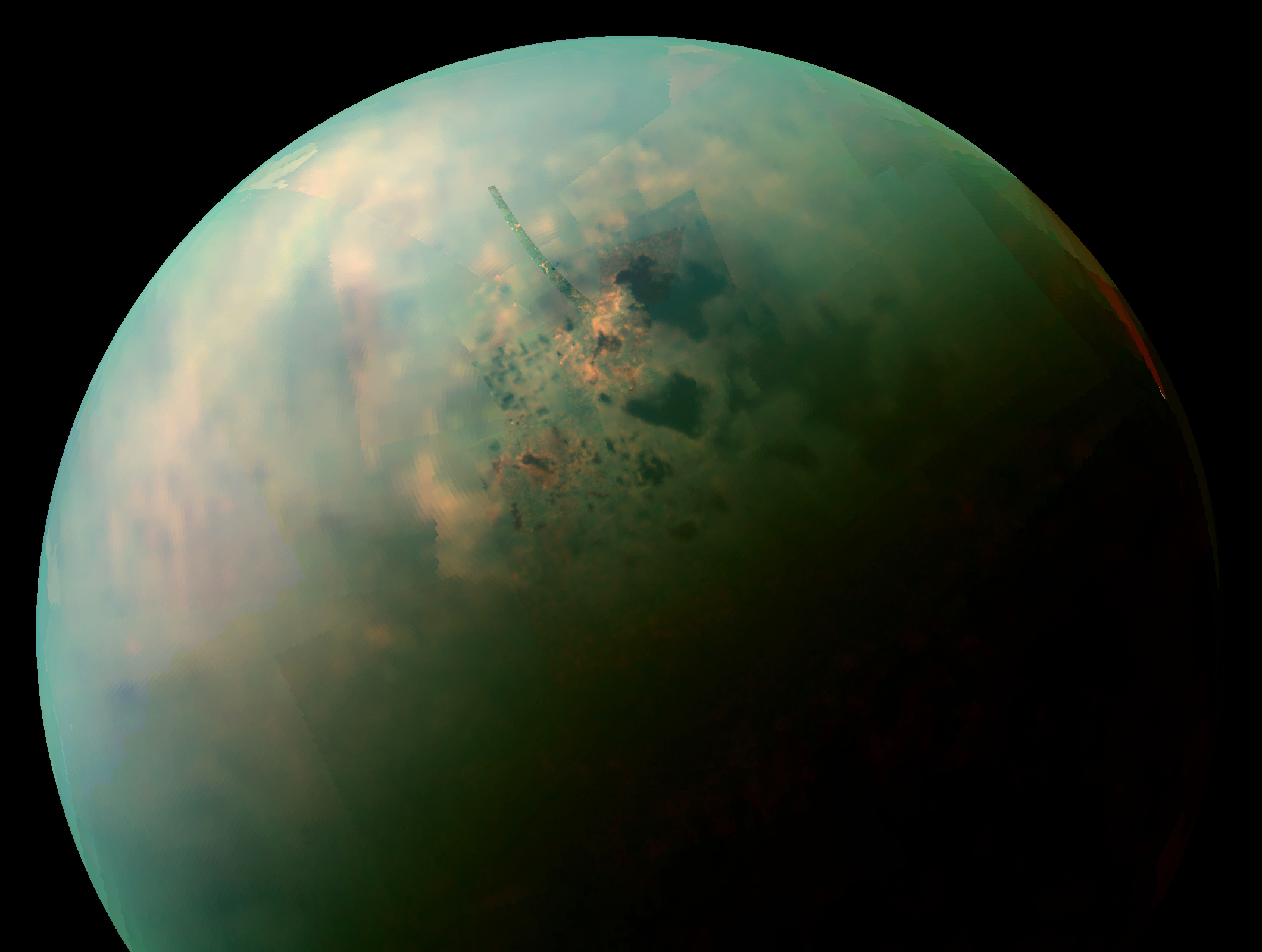
- False-color near infrared view of Titan's northern hemisphere, showing its seas and lakes
- Feature type: Lacus
- Coordinates: 66.7°N 213.9°W
- Diameter: 37.2

Ngami Lacuna is a feature on Saturn's largest moon, Titan, believed to be the currently dry bed of an intermittent hydrocarbon lake.

When full, the lake would be composed of liquid methane and ethane. It was detected in 2007 by the Cassini–Huygens space probe.

Ngami Lacuna is located at coordinates 66.7°N and 213.9°W on Titan's globe and is 37.2 km in diameter. It is named after Lake Ngami, in Botswana, and like its terrestrial namesake is considered to be endorheic.
