= Eyre Lacuna =

Lake on Titan

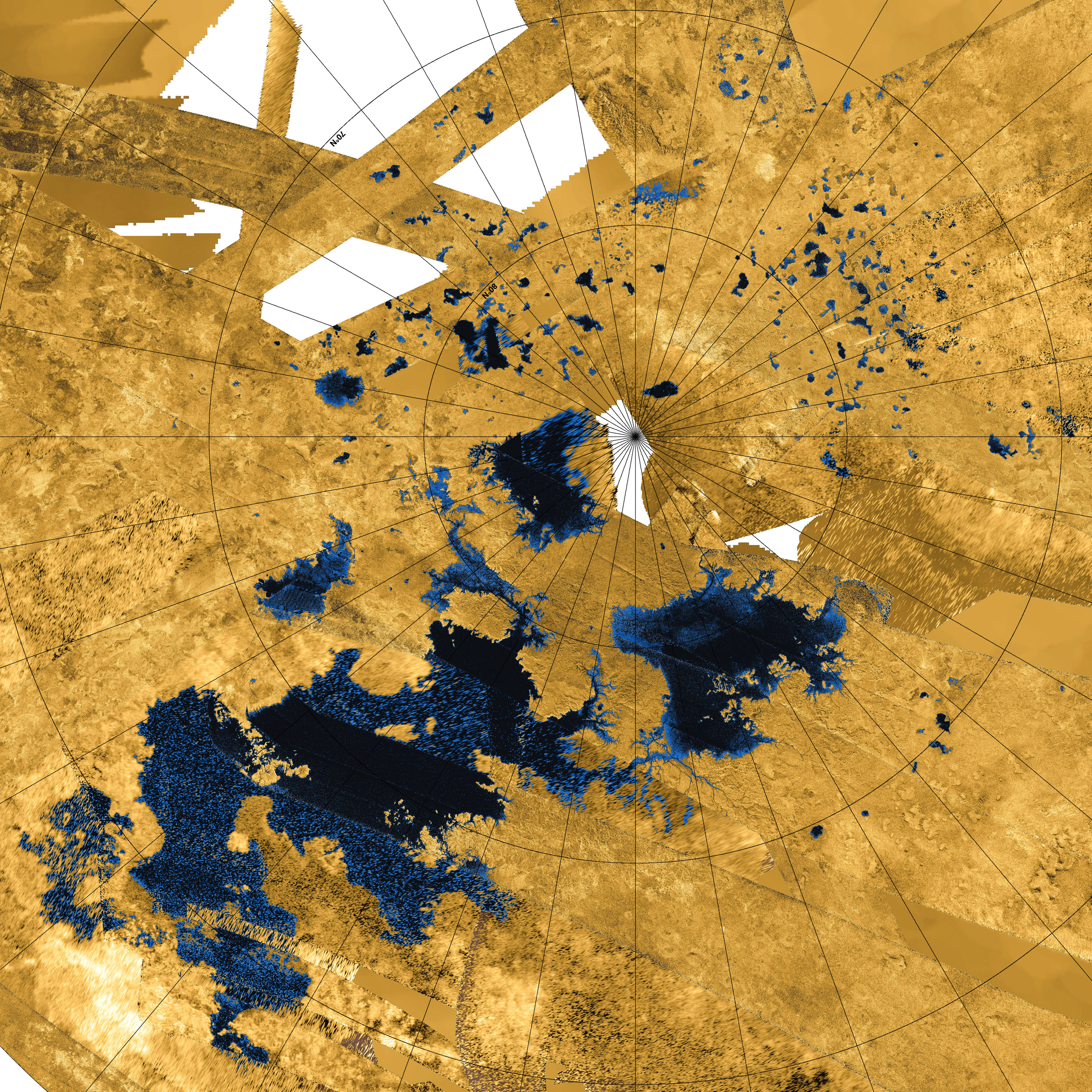
- Synthetic aperture radar mosaic of Titan's north polar region, showing hydrocarbon seas and lakes
- Feature type: Lacus
- Coordinates: 72.6°N 225.1°W
- Diameter: 25.4 km It is named after Lake Eyre, an intermittent lake in Australia.
- Eponym: Lake Abaya

Eyre Lacuna is a feature on Saturn's largest moon, Titan, believed to be a currently dry bed of an intermittent hydrocarbon lake.

When full, the lake would be composed of liquid methane and ethane. It was detected in 2007 by the Cassini–Huygens space probe.
