= Akmena Lacus =

Lake on Titan

- Feature type: Lacus
- Coordinates: 85.1°N 55.6°W
- Diameter: 35.6 km (Note: The USGS web site gives the size as a "diameter", but it is actually the length in the longest dimension.)
- Eponym: Akmenė

Abaya Lacus is one of a number of hydrocarbon lakes found on Saturn's largest moon, Titan.

The lake is 35.6 km in diameter, making its size comparable to Lake Natron, Tanzania on Earth.

Akmena Lacus's name derives from the Lithuanian town Akmenė, located in Samogitia.
