= Woytchugga Lacuna =

Lacuna on Titan

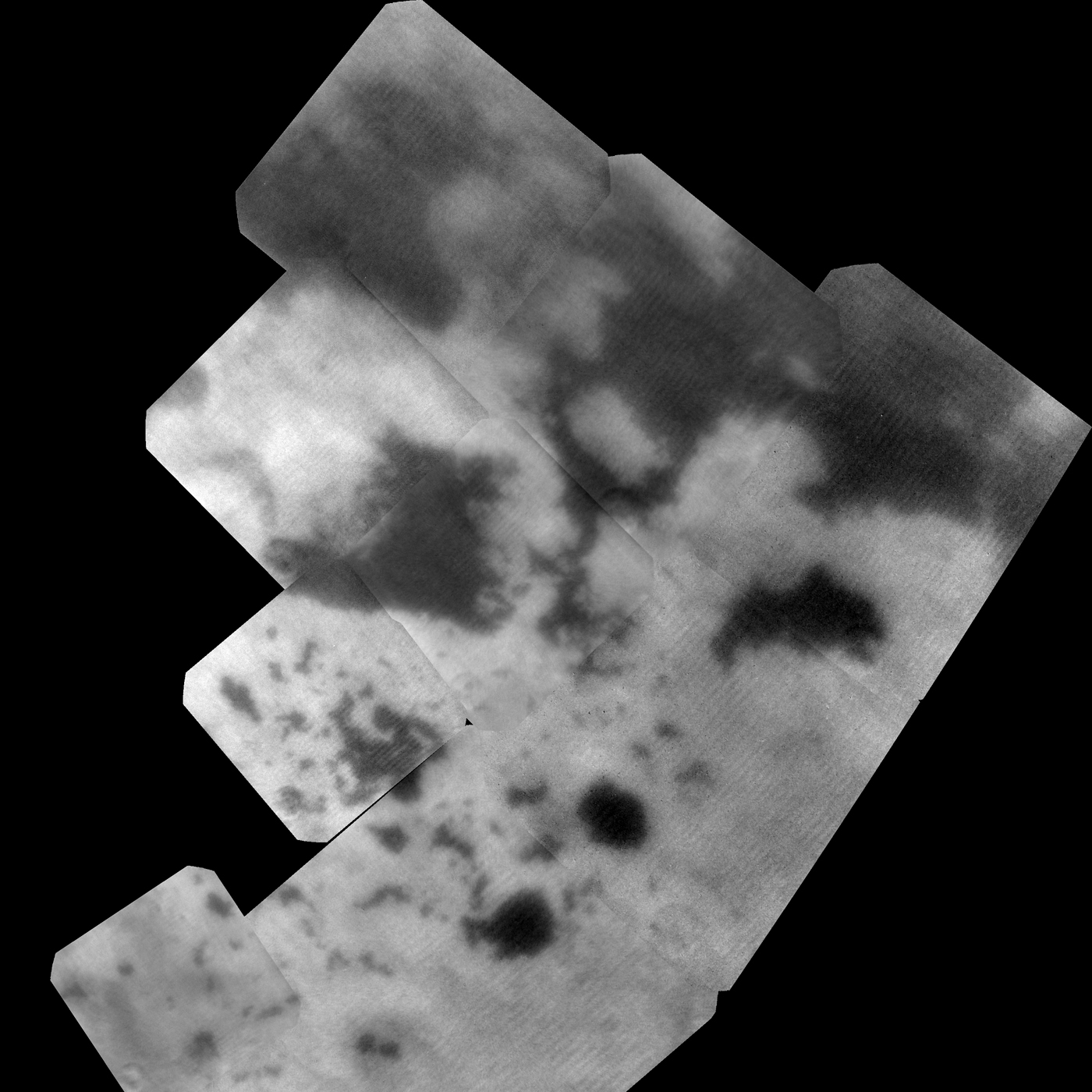
- Cassini view of Titan's north polar seas and lakes in the near infrared.
- Feature type: Lacus
- Coordinates: 68.5°N 109.0°W
- Diameter: 449 km

Woytchugga Lacuna is one of the largest lakes of Titan.

It is located at 68°53′ N and 109°00′ W on Titan's surface and at 449 km in length it is the longest Titanean lake and third longest body of a number of "hydro-carbon lakes" found on Saturn's largest moon". The lake is composed of liquid ethane and methane, and was detected by the Cassini–Huygens space probe. Indications are that it is an intermittent lake and so was named in 2013 after Lake Woytchugga near Wilcannia, Australia.
