= Feia Lacus =

Lake on Titan

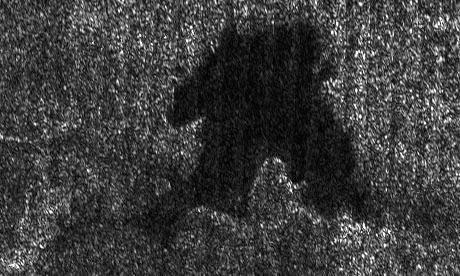
- Cassini synthetic aperture radar image of Feia Lacus, a hydrocarbon lake on Titan with several large peninsulas.
- Feature type: Lacus
- Coordinates: 73.7°N 64.4°W
- Diameter: 47 km (Note: The USGS web site gives the size as a "diameter", but it is actually the length in the longest dimension.)
- Eponym: Lagoa Feia

Feia Lacus is one of a number of hydrocarbon seas and lakes found on Saturn's largest moon, Titan. It was named in 2007 on the basis of data taken by the space probe Cassini.

The lake is located at latitude 73.7°N and longitude 64.41° W on Titan's globe, and is composed of liquid methane and ethane. At 47 km in length it is moderately sized. It is named after Lagoa Feia in Brazil.

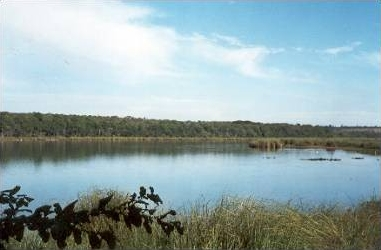
Lagoa Feia in Brazil
