= Koitere Lacus =

Lake on Titan

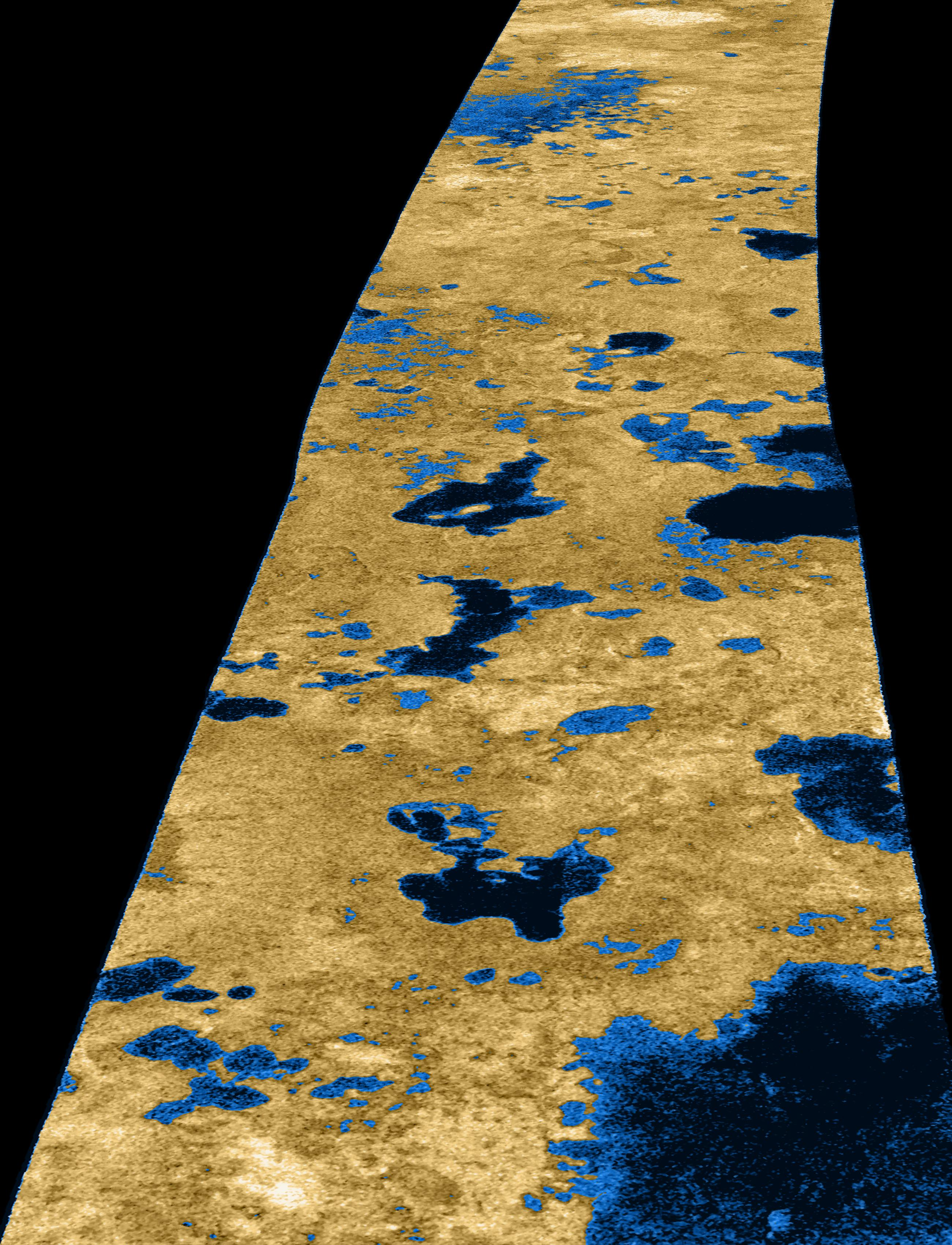
- False-color Cassini radar image of hydrocarbon lakes on Titan (2006), showing Koitere Lacus in the middle distance, to the left of center, with a prominent island.
- Feature type: Lacus
- Coordinates: 79.4°N 36.14°W
- Diameter: 68 km (Note: The USGS web site gives the size as a "diameter", but it is actually the length in the longest dimension.)
- Eponym: Koitere

Koitere Lacus is one of a number of hydrocarbon lakes found on Saturn's largest moon, Titan. The lake is composed of liquid methane and ethane, and was detected by the space probe Cassini.

The lacus is located at coordinates 79.4°N and 36.14°W on Titan's globe, in a region close to the north pole where most of Titan's lakes are located. The lake is 68 km in length, and is named after Koitere, a lake in Finland.
