= Sionascaig Lacus =

Lake on Titan

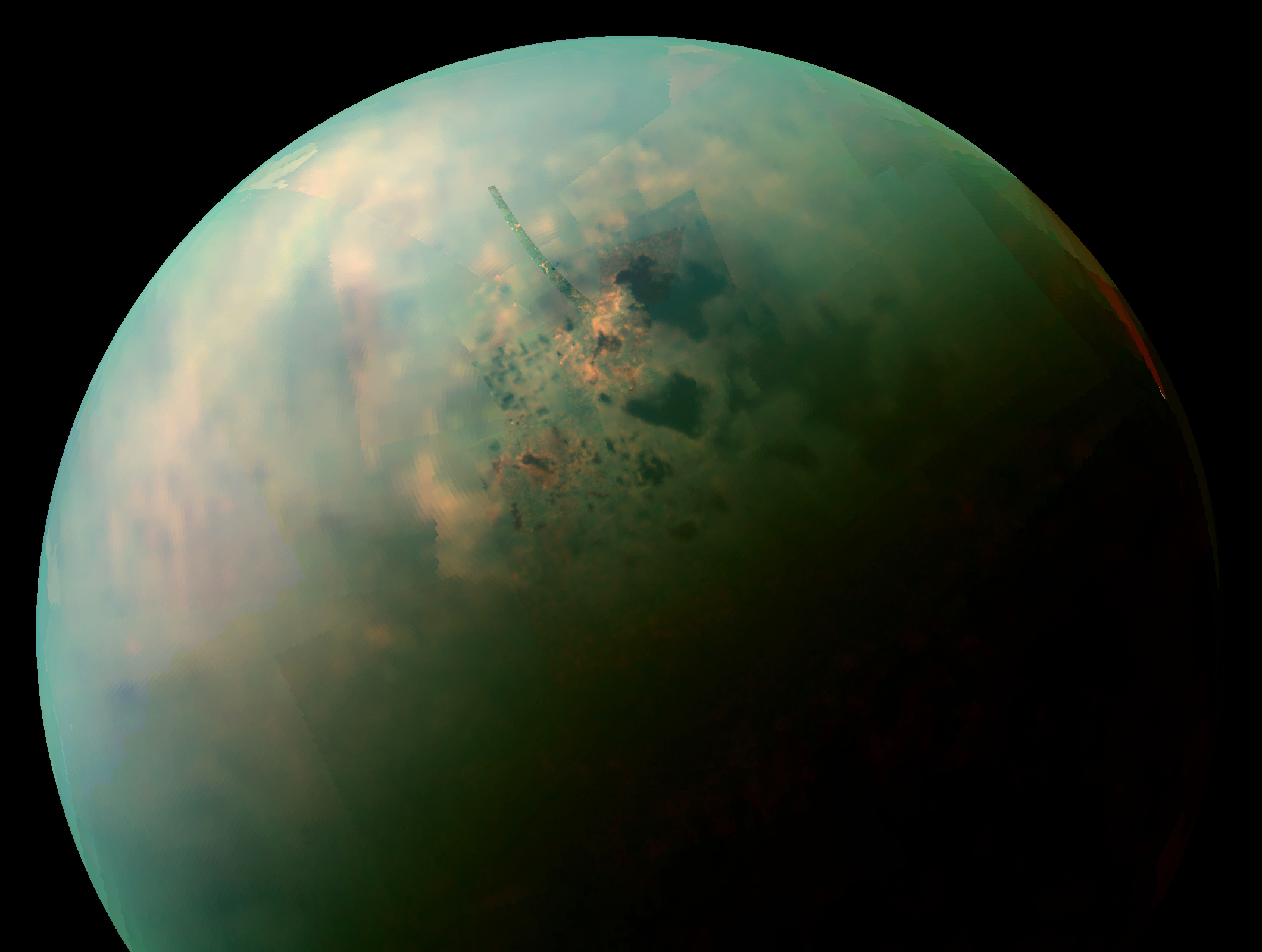
- False-color near infrared view of Titan's northern hemisphere, showing its seas and lakes.
- Feature type: Lacus
- Coordinates: 42.526°S 278.12°W
- Diameter: 200km
- Eponym: Loch Sionascaig

Sionascaig Lacus is one of a number of hydrocarbon seas and lakes found on Saturn's largest moon, Titan. The lake is located at latitude 41.52°S and longitude 278.12°W on Titan's globe, and is composed of liquid methane and ethane. The feature is named for the Earth lake, Loch Sionascaig, in Scotland.
