= Ladoga Lacus =

Geographical feature on Titan, moon of Saturn

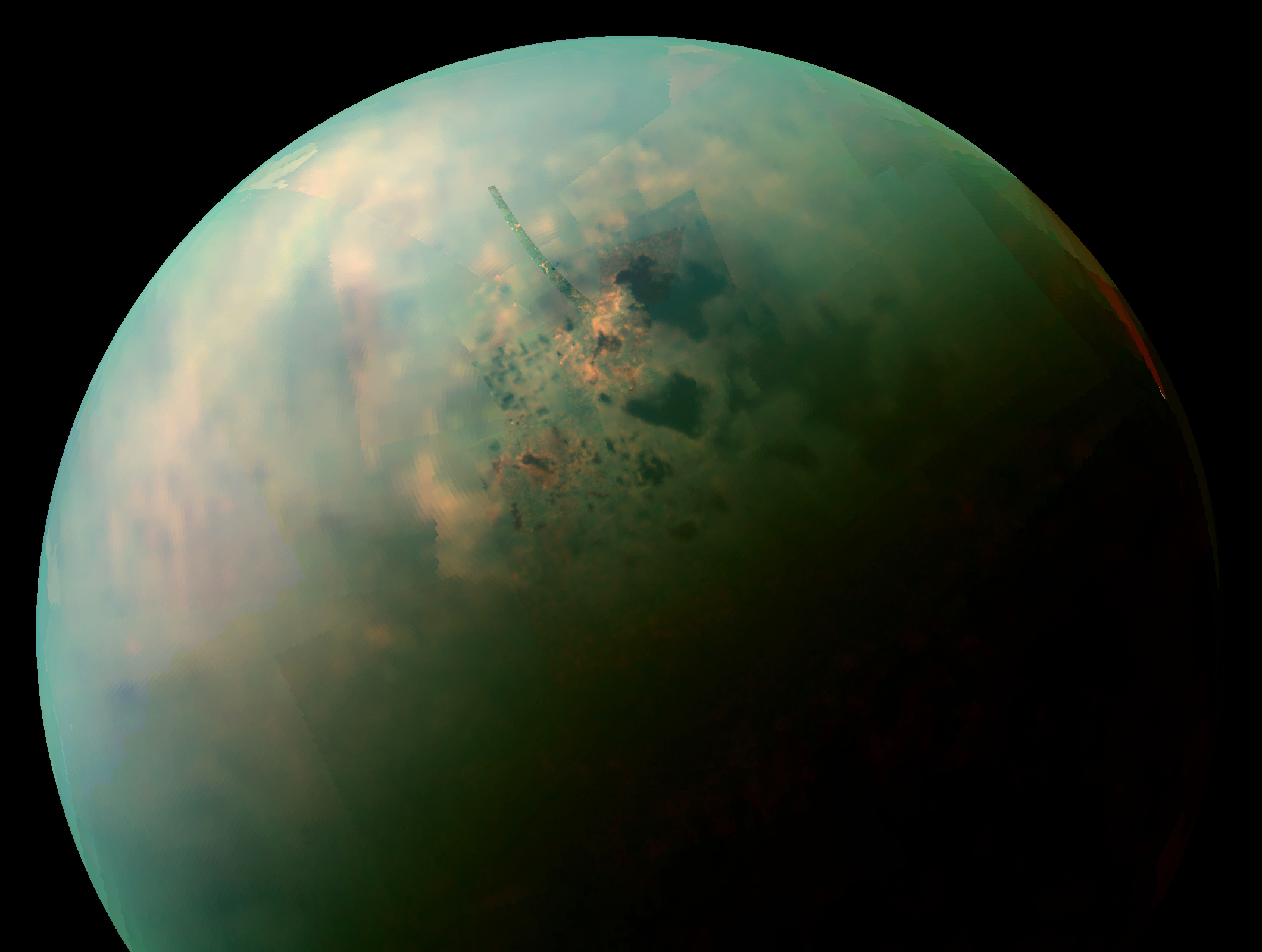
- False-color near infrared view of Titan's northern hemisphere, showing its seas and lakes. Orange areas near some of them may be deposits of organic evaporite left behind by receding liquid hydrocarbon.
- Feature type: Lacus
- Coordinates: 74.8°N 26.1°W
- Diameter: 110 km (Note: The USGS web site gives the size as a "diameter", but it is actually the length in the longest dimension.)
- Eponym: Lake Ladoga

Ladoga Lacus is a geographical feature on Saturn's largest moon, Titan, named after Lake Ladoga, Russia. It is one of a number of "methane lakes" found in Titan's north polar region.

The lake, detected in 2004 by the Cassini space probe, is composed of liquid ethane and methane. It is 110 kilometers along its longest dimension and is located at 74.8°N 26.1°W on Titan's globe.
