= Müggel Lacus =

Lake on Titan

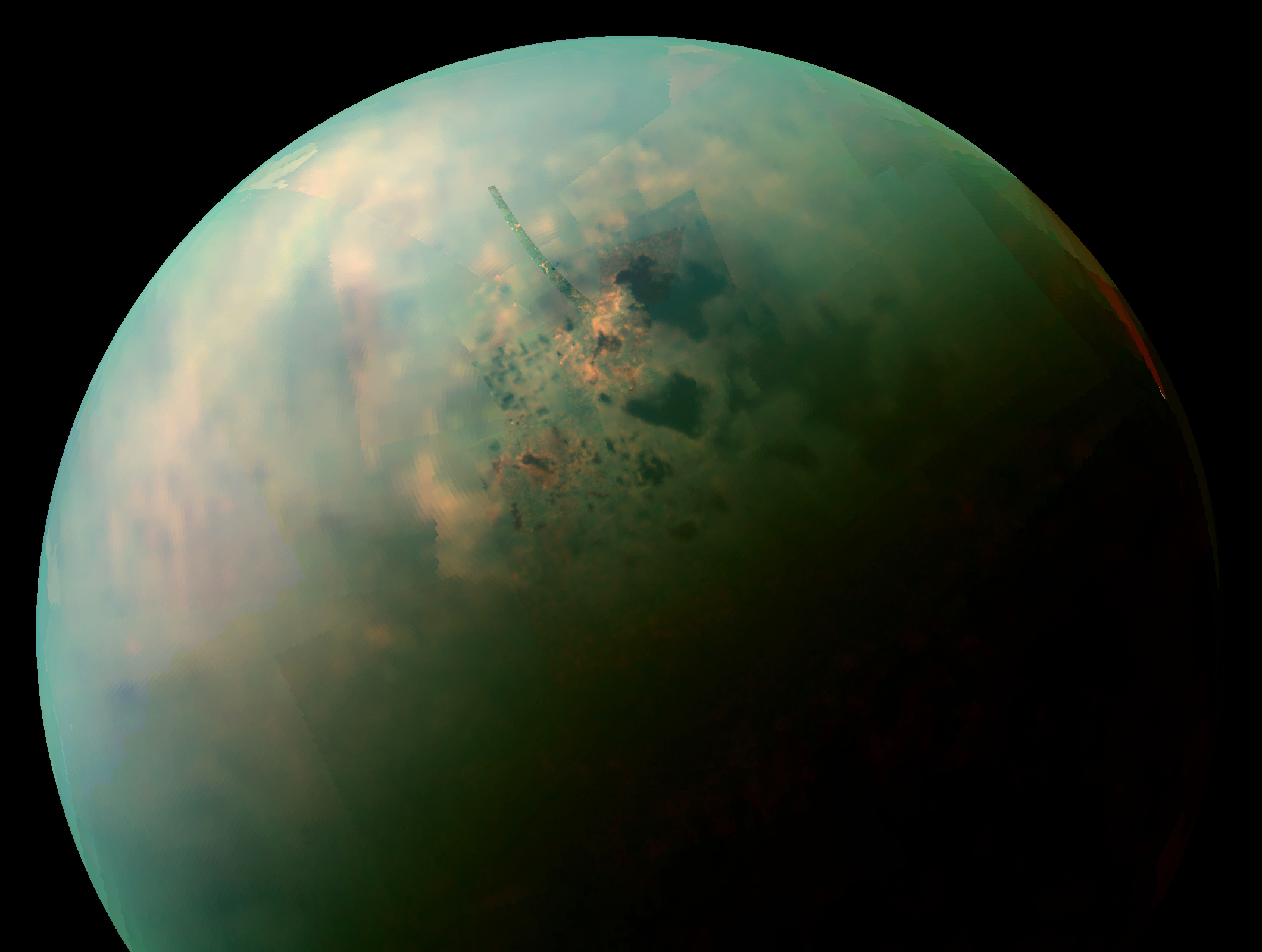
- False-color near infrared view of Titan's northern hemisphere, showing its seas and lakes.
- Feature type: Lacus
- Coordinates: 84.44°N 203.5°W
- Diameter: 170 km (Note: The USGS web site gives the size as a "diameter", but it is actually the length in the longest dimension.)
- Eponym: Müggelsee

Müggel Lacus is one of a number of hydrocarbon seas and lakes found on Saturn's largest moon, Titan.

The lake is located at latitude 84.44°N and longitude 203.5° W on Titan's globe, and is composed of liquid methane and ethane, With a diameter of 170 km, it is the fifth largest of Titan's named lakes. It is named after Müggelsee in Berlin, Germany, the term being adopted by the International Astronomical Union on 3 December 2013.
