= Kutch Lacuna =

Lake on Titan

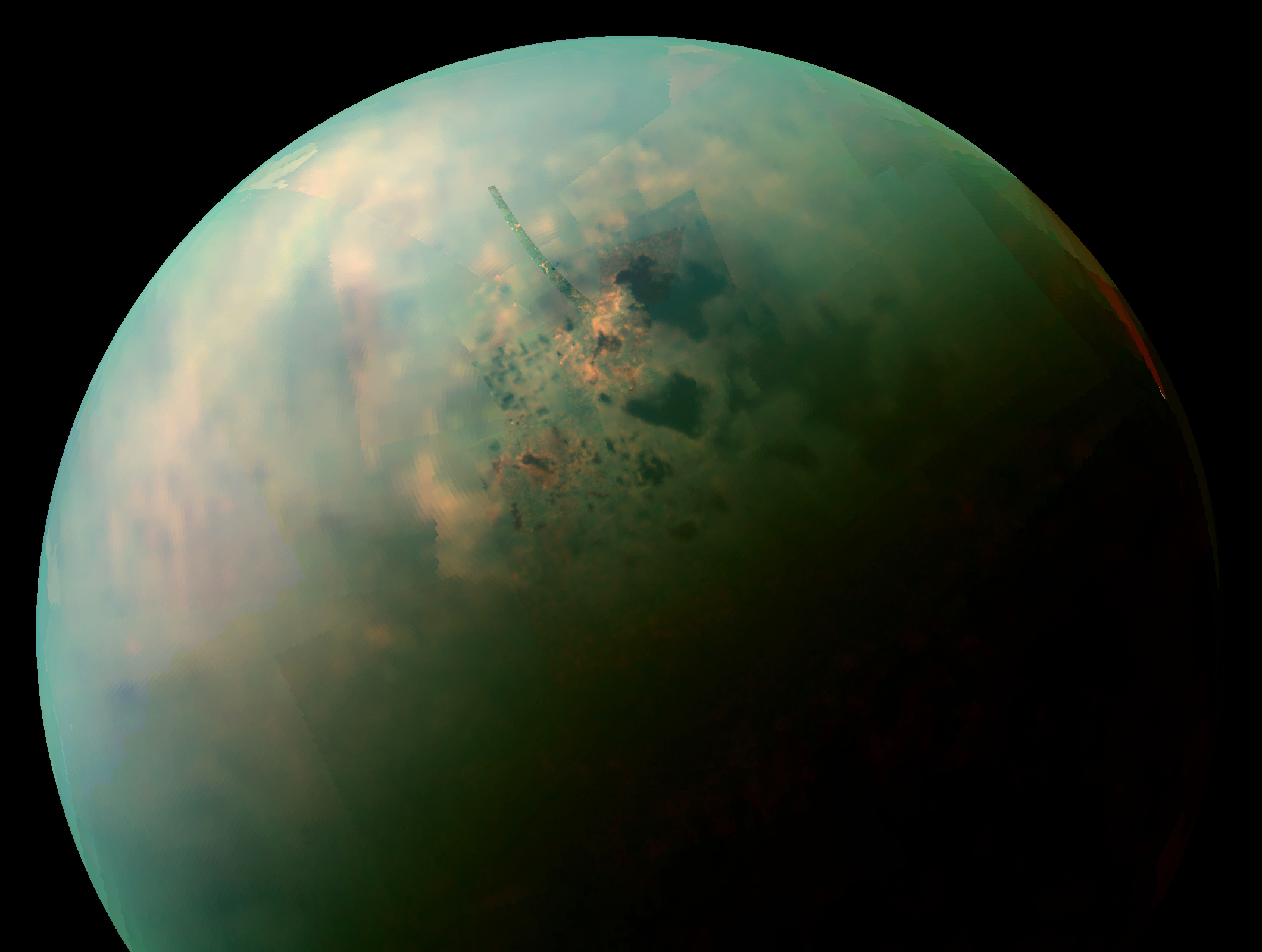
- Cassini view of Titan's north polar seas and lakes in the near infrared.
- Feature type: Lacus
- Coordinates: 88.4°N 217°W
- Diameter: 175 km

Kutch Lacuna is a large intermittent lake on Titan.

It is located at 88.4°N and 217°W on Titan's surface and is 175 km (109 mi) long. The lake is composed of liquid ethane and methane and was detected by the Cassini–Huygens space probe.

Indications are that it is an intermittent lake, so in 2013 was named after the Great Rann of Kutch, a highly variable salt marsh in India and Pakistan.
