= Hufaidh =

Mythical island in the marshes of southern Iraq

Hufaidh (Arabic: حفيظ) is a mythical island in the marshes of southern Iraq, believed to exist by the Marsh Arabs (or Ahwaris).

== Description ==
The Marsh Arabs informants of the British traveler Wilfred Thesiger asserted that:

on it are palaces, and palm trees and gardens of pomegranates, and the buffaloes are bigger than ours. But no one knows exactly where it is... anyone who sees Hufaidh is bewitched, and afterwards no one can understand his words...They say the Jinns can hide the island from anyone who comes near it.

R. S. M. Sturges (Political Officer at Qurnah in 1920) shared with Thesiger a possible connection between Hufaidh and the biblical Garden of Eden. Sturges wrote about the local legend of “a lost island in the marshes bearing luscious fruits and guarded . . . On certain nights it shone with a radiance visible for many miles. It seemed to move like some out-size will-o'-the-wisp and eluded all attempts to track it down . . . I saw it myself once – a strong diffused glow as of the full moon just below the horizon.”

The mythical island has been described as "Arabian Nights-like" due to its legends of gold palaces and for being a Jinn habitable area that was only seen by lost locals.

== Sightings ==
Thesiger's host, a man named Saddam, related that “One of the Fartus saw it, years ago, when I was a child. He was looking for buffalo and when he came back his speech was all muddled up, and we knew he had seen Hufaidh." He further said, “Saihut, the great AIbu Muhammad Sheikh, searched for Hufaidh with a fleet of canoes in the days of the Turks, but he found nothing. When Thesiger made some skeptical comment Saddam emphatically replied, "No, Sahib, Hufaidh is there all right. Ask anyone, the sheikhs or the Government. Everyone knows about Hufaidh."

== See also ==
- Avalon, a legendary island featured in King Arthur legends.
- Brasil, a similar mythical island believed to be in Ireland.
- Wadi al-Salam, Islamic cemetery in Najaf believed to be inhabited by Ghouls.
