= Punga Mare =

Sea on Titan

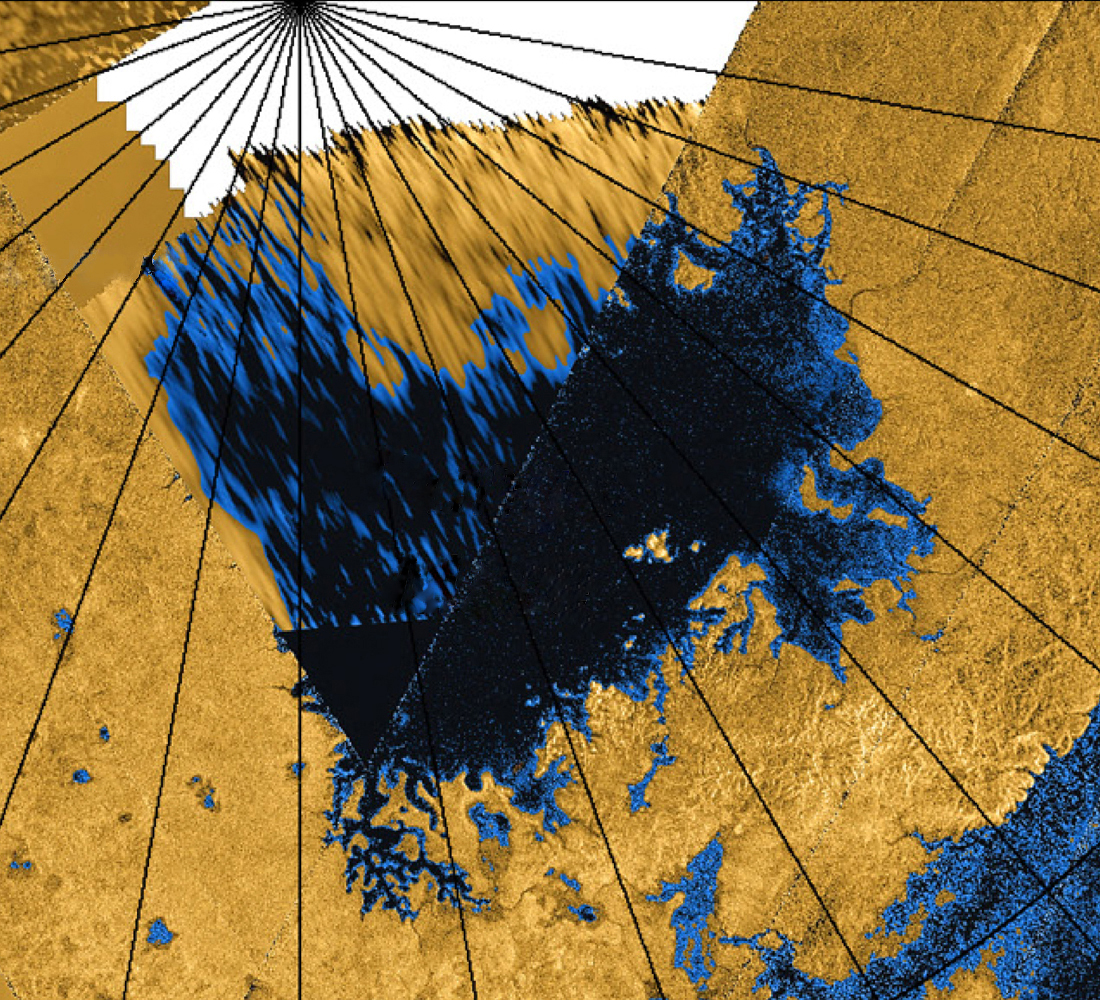
- Punga Mare from a false-color mosaic of synthetic aperture radar images of Titan's north polar region. A northern extension of Kraken Mare enters the view at lower right.
- Feature type: Mare
- Coordinates: 85°N 340°W
- Diameter: 380 km (Note: The USGS web site gives the size as a "diameter", but it is actually the length in the longest dimension.)
- Eponym: Punga

Punga Mare /ˈpʌŋə/ is a lake in the north polar region of Titan, the planet Saturn's largest moon. After Kraken Mare and Ligeia Mare, it is the third largest known body of liquid on Titan. It is composed of liquid hydrocarbons (mainly methane and ethane). Located almost adjacent to the north pole at 85.1° N, 339.7° W, it measures roughly 380 km (236 mi) across, greater than the length of Lake Victoria on Earth. Its surface area is ~61,000 km^{2} (23,522 sq. mi). Its namesake is Punga, in Māori mythology ancestor of sharks, rays and lizards and a son of Tangaroa, the god of the sea.
