= Punga, Tanzania =

Coordinates: 11°05′S 35°07′E

Punga is a village in Mbinga, Ruvuma, Tanzania. Its geographical coordinates ar 11° 5' 0" South, 35° 7' 0" East.
