= Lake Woytchugga =

Lake in Australia

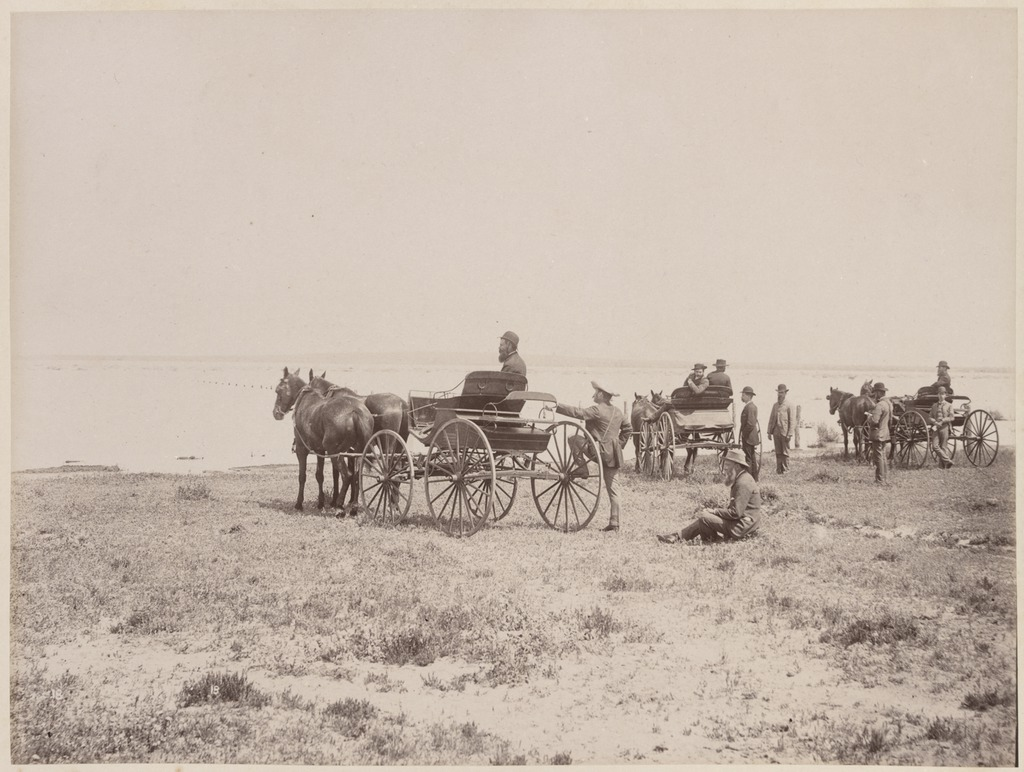
- Lake Woytchugga, 1886.

- Location within New South Wales
- Location: North western New South Wales
- Coordinates: 31.559769°S 143.308378°E
- Basin countries: Australia
- Surface area: 19 km^{2} (7.3 sq mi)
- Settlements: Wilcannia

Lake Woytchugga is an ephemeral lake situated to the west of Wilcannia, New South Wales, Australia. In late 2012 it became notable because the dry lake bed had caught fire.

When full, the lake covers an area of around 1,900 hectares, and its name means "Moon" in the local Danggali, Aboriginal language.

== See also ==
- Woytchugga Lacuna, a methane lake on Titan
