= Bolsena Lacus =

Lake on Titan

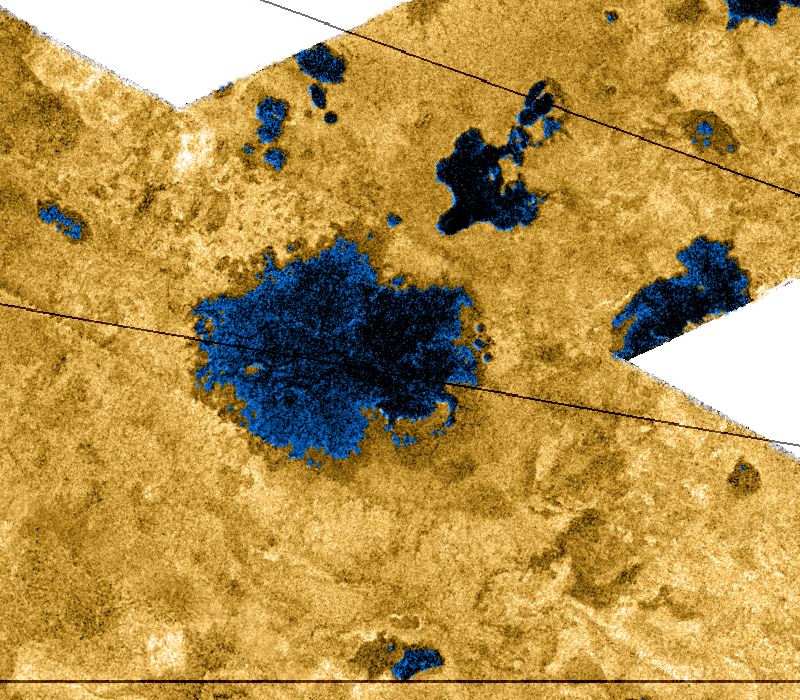
- False-color Cassini synthetic aperture radar image of hydrocarbon lakes on Titan. Bolsena Lacus is at center, with Sotonera Lacus to its upper right.
- Feature type: Lacus
- Coordinates: 75.8°N 10.3°W
- Diameter: 101 km (Note: The USGS web site gives the size as a "diameter", but it is actually the length in the longest dimension.)
- Eponym: Lake Bolsena

Bolsena Lacus is one of a number of hydrocarbon lakes found on Saturn's largest moon, Titan.

Bolsena Lacus is located near the north pole of Titan, centered on latitude 75.75°N and longitude 10.28°W, and measures 101 km in length. It is situated in a north polar region where the majority of Titan's large lakes are found.

The lake is composed of liquid methane and ethane, and was detected by the Cassini space probe. It was named in 2007 after Lake Bolsena in Italy.
