= Abaya Lacus =

Lake on Titan

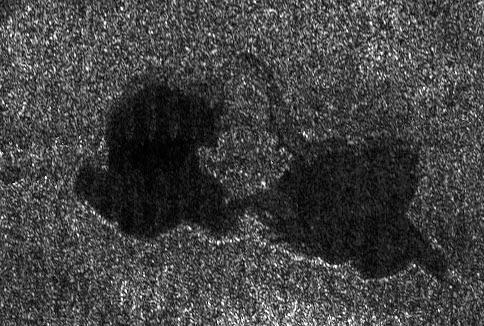
- Titan's "kissing lakes", Abaya Lacus, as viewed by Cassini's synthetic aperture radar.
- Feature type: Lacus
- Coordinates: 73.2°N 45.6°W
- Diameter: 65 km (Note: The USGS web site gives the size as a "diameter", but it is actually the length in the longest dimension.)
- Eponym: Lake Abaya

Abaya Lacus is one of a number of hydrocarbon lakes found on Saturn's largest moon, Titan.

The lake is composed of liquid methane and ethane, and was detected by the Cassini space probe.

Abaya Lacus is located at coordinates 73.17°N and 45.55°W on Titan's globe and is 65 km in length. It is named after Lake Abaya in Ethiopia.
