= Punga, Namibia =

Village in Zambezi Region, Namibia

Punga
- Location within Namibia
- Coordinates: 17°47′S 25°06′E
- Country: Namibia
- Time zone: UTC+2 (SAST)

Punga is a village in Zambezi Region, Namibia. There is also a village in Rajasthan, India, with the same name.
