= Doom Mons =

Mountain on Titan

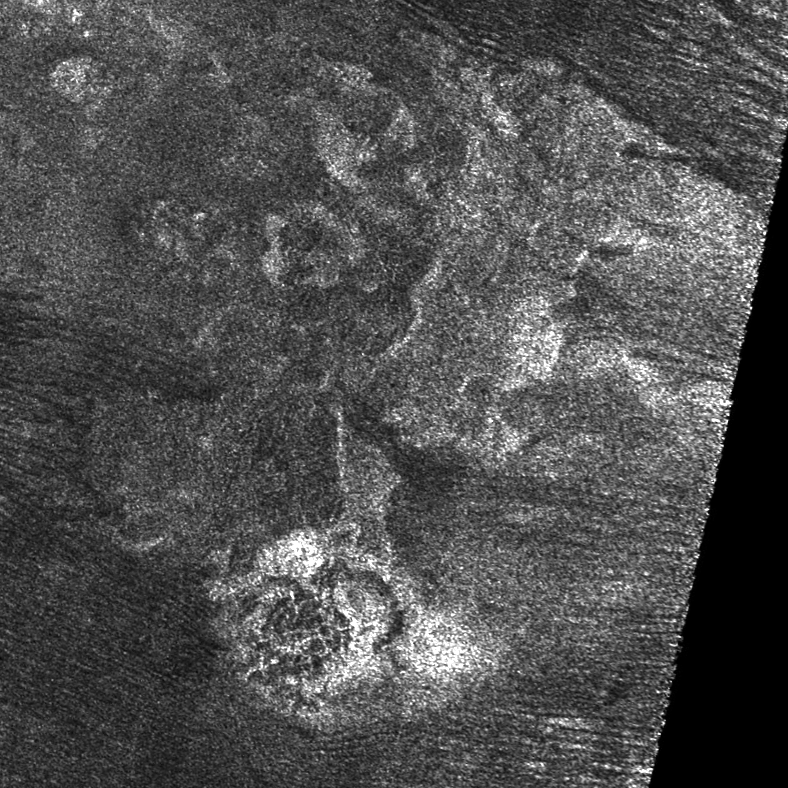
- Doom Mons with collapse feature Sotra Patera and flow feature Mohini Fluctus, the latter partially covered by dunes. Radar image by Cassini, 2007
- Feature type: Mountain, possible cryovolcano
- Location: Aztlan, Titan
- Coordinates: 14°39′S 40°25′W
- Peak: 1.45 km (0.90 mi) above the surrounding plains
- Discoverer: Cassini
- Eponym: Mount Doom, Middle-earth, from J. R. R. Tolkien's works

Doom Mons is the name of a mountain range and its eponymous peak on Titan, the largest moon of Saturn. A putative cryovolcano, it is the largest mountain range on Titan by volume. It was discovered by the Cassini–Huygens probe in 2005 and officially named in 2012.

== Naming ==
Doom Mons is named after Mount Doom, a volcano that appears in J. R. R. Tolkien's fictional world of Middle-earth, most prominently in The Lord of the Rings. The name follows a convention by the IAU Working Group for Planetary System Nomenclature that Titanean mountains are named after mountains in Tolkien's works. Other examples of Titanean mountains or mountain ranges named after Tolkien's works include Erebor Mons, the Irensaga Montes, Mindolluin Montes, Misty Montes, Mithrim Montes, and Taniquetil Montes. The name of Mount Doom was formally announced for the Titanean mountain on November 13, 2012.

== Location ==
Doom Mons is located in the Titan's southern hemisphere, between 14 and 15° south and 40–41° west. It is located within the Aztlan darklands region, possibly connected to the wider Shangri-La dark region, and is adjacent to Sotra Patera, a possible cryovolcanic caldera 1.7 km (1.1 mi) deep.

Mohini Fluctus, a bright lobate flow feature at least 200 kilometers (120 mi) long, appears to emerge from Doom Mons and extends to the northeast. It is partially covered by dunes, including at its visible terminus, suggesting it is on the order of tens of meters thick. About 470 km (290 mi) to the north-northeast is situated another putative cryovolcanic feature, Erebor Mons, which is 40 km (25 mi) across, over 1 km (1,000 m; 0.62 mi; 3,300 ft) high, and has lobate flow features to its north and east.

== Characteristics and height ==
From 2005, the findings of the Cassini–Huygens probe have revealed a largely smooth surface of Titan, with some notable abnormalities. Many Titanean "mountains" are little more than hills. However, some of these mountains rise to some several hundreds of meters high. Doom Mons is currently believed to be possibly the largest Titanean mountain range and with the eponymous peak one of the highest; the title of highest peak on Titan is thought to be held by the Mithrim Montes, which may have been formed by global contraction. Doom Mons is believed to be a twin-peak that rises 1.45 km (0.90 mi) above the relatively flat surrounding plain, and a probable massive cryovolcano. It has a 500–600 m deep indentation on its western side, containing a circular pit that is another 400 m deep, while Sotra Patera is immediately to its east.

Doom Mons is constantly bombarded with wind, rain and snow composed of liquid methane and ethane, hydrocarbon dust and organic smog and tholin haze; the summit of Doom Mons, however, appears to be mostly clear and ice-capped with water ice. The superficial features of Doom Mons are constantly changing, a fact which may be exacerbated by a sub-surface, briny ocean. The permanent hurricane at the southern pole of Titan probably causes an issue of constant erosion on Doom Mons, preventing the mountain from growing taller. Doom Mons is believed to have a total width about 60 km (37 mi). Robert Brown of the University of Arizona, one of the controllers of the Cassini-Huygens probe, gave the following description of Doom Mons at the December 2006 meeting of the American Geophysical Union in San Francisco, California:

"This mountain range is tall enough to produce streamers of clouds that extend far around the moon. You could call this the Titan Sierras. Several smaller ranges appear to be nearby, as does a circular feature that might be the crater from an ancient asteroid impact powerful enough to have punched through Titan's outer crust. I speculate that the mountains might be a chain of volcanoes that oozed up along cracks in the crust after the impact."

== Fiction ==
Coincidentally, before The Lord of the Rings was published, a fictional mountain range of Titan already existed that carried the name "Mount Doom"; this was a major setting in the 1935 science-fiction tale Flight on Titan by Stanley G. Weinbaum. This was one of the locations in the Titan portion of Weinbaum's acclaimed Planetary series. Weinbaum's Mount Doom was alternatively referred to in the tale as the "Mountains of Death", or "Mountains of The Damned"; it was populated by hostile native wildlife such as "Ice-Ants", "Whiplash Trees", pterodactyl-like "Knife-Kites", and the hypnosis-inducing "Giant Titanian Cave Threadworm". The climate of Weinbaum's mountain is described as sub-Arctic, and it is constantly battered by howling ice-needle storms and hurricane-force winds.
