= Saraswati Flumen =

Rivers of liquid methane and ethane on Saturn's moon Titan

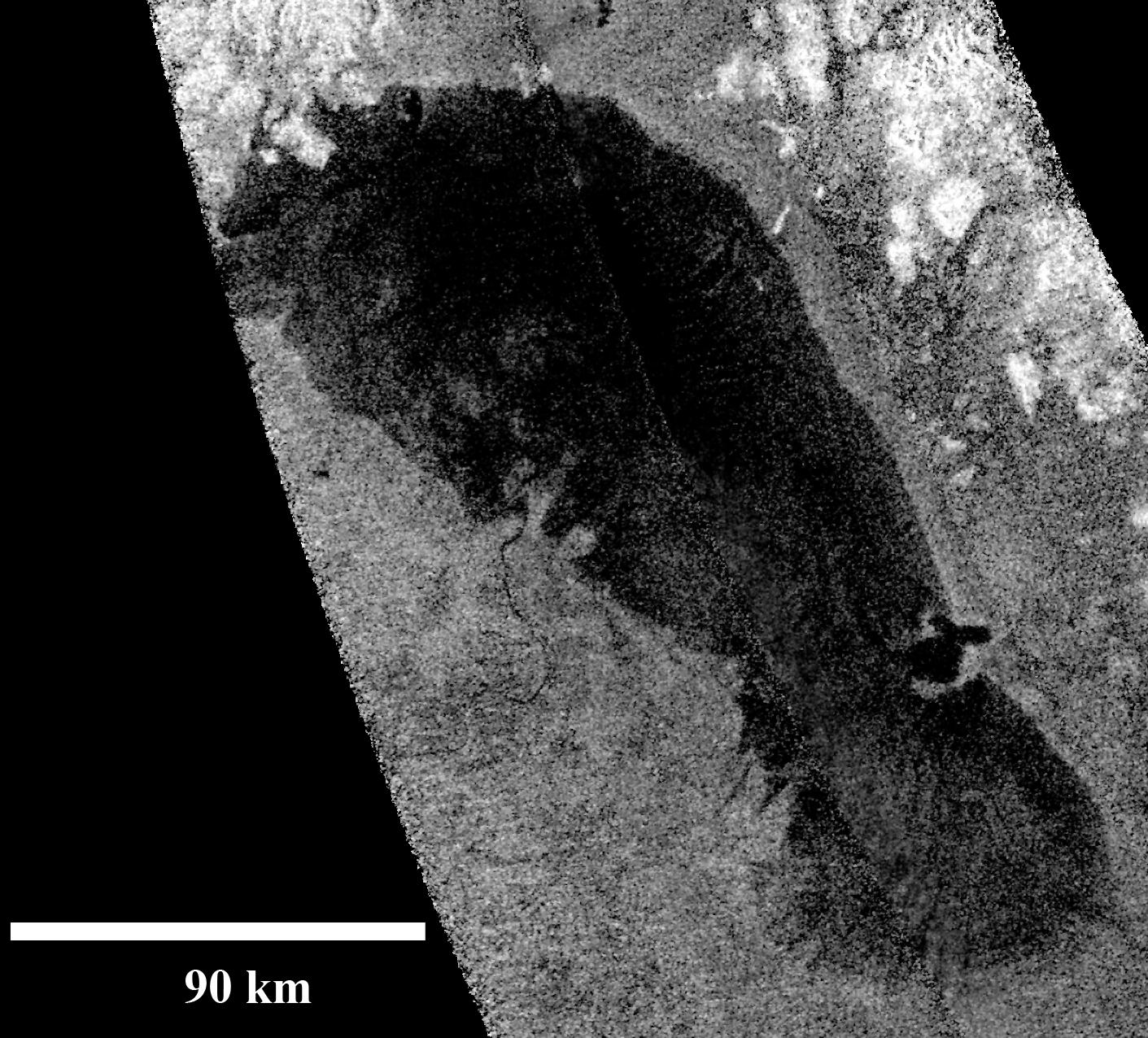
- Synthetic aperture radar image from Cassini of Saraswati Flumen and its wave-modified delta draining into Ontario Lacus
- Etymology: From the Saraswati River from the Hindu Vedas

Location
- Moon: Titan

Physical characteristics
- Source: Near the perimeter of Romo Planitia
- Mouth: Ontario Lacus
- Length: >360 km
- Width
  - maximum: ~700 m
- Discharge
  - average: 10–2,000 m^{3}/s (estimated 2023)

Basin features
- Discoverer: Cassini

Saraswati Flumen is a river system (termed Flumen) of liquid methane and ethane on Saturn's moon Titan. It flows for 360 km before discharging into Ontario Lacus near Titan's south pole in a river delta on the lake's western shore. Its bankfull discharge is estimated to be 40–50,000 m^{3}/s but its regular flow is estimated to be 10–2,000 m^{3}/s. Compared to Karesos Flumen and Hubur Flumen, the two other major rivers that drain into the Ontario Lacus which both originate in mountains, the Saraswati Flumen has a much flatter gradient. The Saraswati Flumen is unlike most rivers on Titan including the more well known Vid Flumina in that it has a river delta. Furthermore, its delta is double-lobed, suggesting that the river switched courses over tens to hundreds of thousands of years to build both lobes. The main lobe is around 97 km^{2} in area while the secondary lobe is around 50 km^{2}. It is hypothesized to be a suspended load-dominated river.

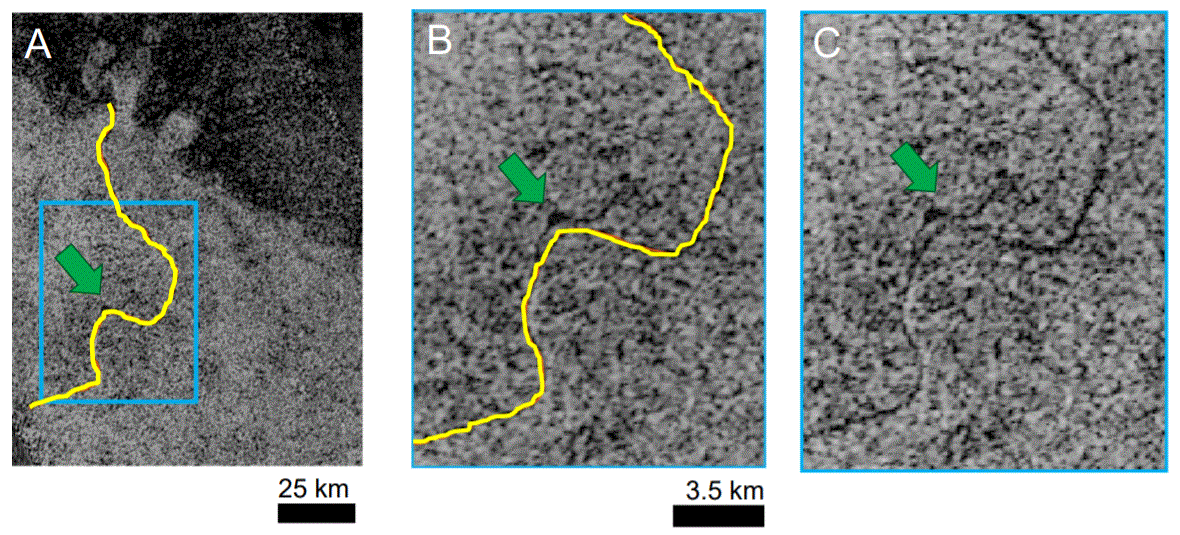
A possible oxbow lake on the Saraswati Flumen
