= Vid Flumina =

Rivers of liquid methane and ethane on Saturn's moon Titan

Coordinates: 73°N 243°W

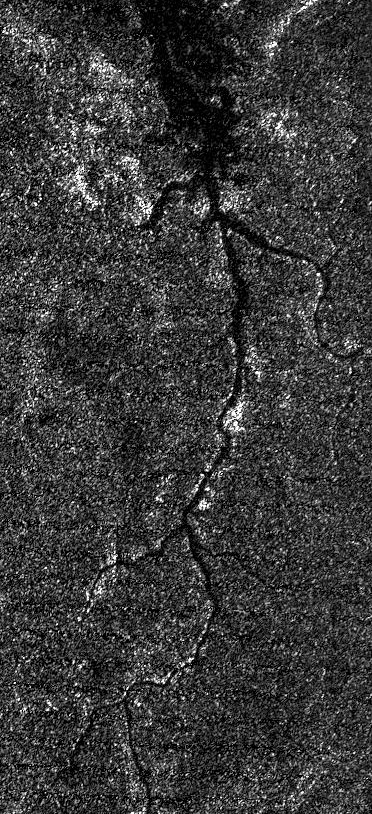
- Synthetic aperture radar image from Cassini of Vid Flumina flowing into Ligeia Mare on Titan

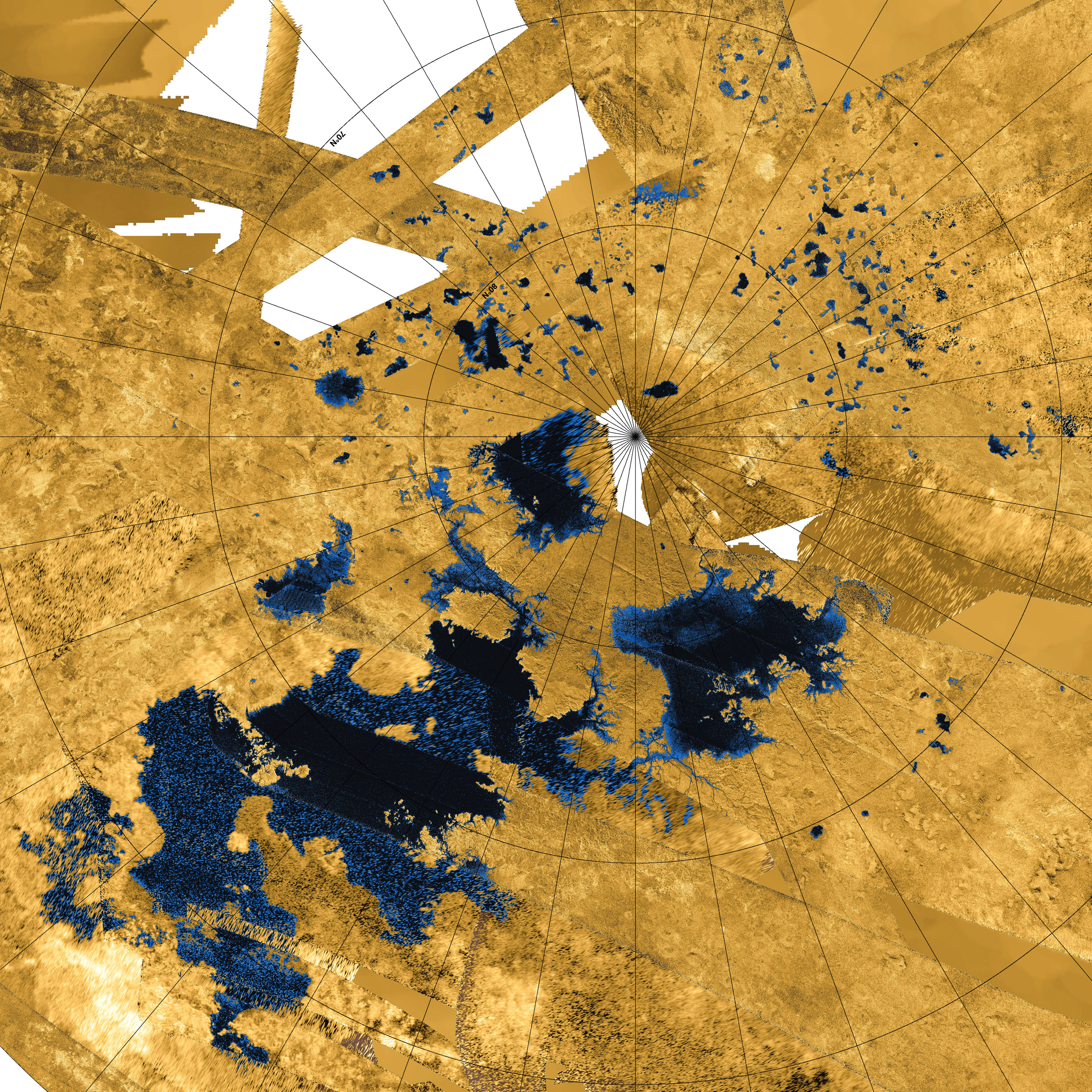
- Etymology: From the Við or Vimur River from Norse Mythology

Location
- Moon: Titan

Physical characteristics
- Mouth: Ligeia Mare
- Length: >400 km
- Discharge
  - average: 40 m^{3}/s (2013, predicted)

Basin features
- Discoverer: Cassini

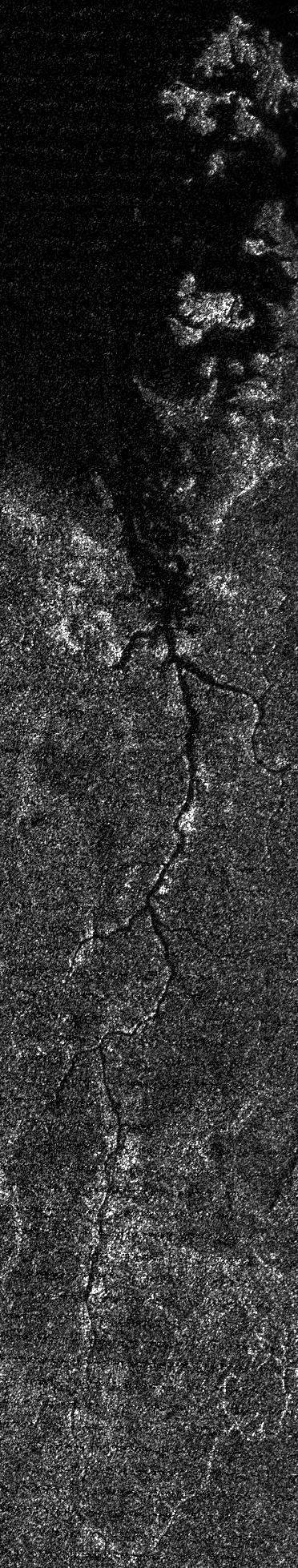
Synthetic aperture radar image mosaic of Titan's north polar region

Vid Flumina is a river system (termed Flumen) of liquid methane and ethane on Saturn's moon Titan. It is more than 400 km (249 mi) long and flows into Titan's second largest hydrocarbon sea, Ligeia Mare. The surface of Titan is mostly water ice, so Vid Flumina is a river of methane and ethane flowing across and cutting canyons into ice as though it were bedrock. NASA scientists think that it likely has rapids, whirlpools and falls, just like rivers on Earth.

== Discovery and naming ==
=== Earlier findings ===
In 2004, NASA's probe, Cassini arrived at Saturn to study it and its moons. The scientists at NASA were expecting to find some evidence for liquid methane because of Titan's surface temperature and its methane-rich atmosphere. However, Cassini's early findings that were focused on Titan's equator revealed no traces of seas or rivers.

The early disappointment changed as the Cassini's orbit shifted and allowed the researchers at NASA to bounce radar off other regions of the moon. The radar signals were then routinely reflected off angled, rough features such as sand dunes and rocks and cliffs, but when the radar reached the polar regions of Titan, the regular signals ceased. These non-reflecting dark spots were actually reminiscent of the lakes, rivers and tributaries on Earth.

=== Discovery ===
In December 2012, Jani Radebaugh, a scientist on Cassini's team along with an international team of colleagues, announced that they had discovered a liquid methane river of over 200 miles resembling the Nile from an image taken on 26 September 2012.

=== Naming ===
The river is named after a mythological river in Norse mythology that was part of the Élivágar system of extremely cold and poisonous rivers in Ginnungagap. The name was approved by the International Astronomical Union on 13 February 2013.

== Geology ==
The river flows along a relatively straight course, suggesting that it follows one or more fault lines, similar to other large nearby rivers. The river slices through a rough and slanted terrain, which suggests operation of processes similar to tectonic movements on Earth.

Radar studies show that Vid Flumina and its tributaries flow through canyons about one km wide and 0.57 kilometres (0.35 mi) deep, with slopes of about 40°. Flowing methane was detected in the channels. The elevation of the main channel was found to be within 1 m of that of Ligeia Mare, while tributary channels have higher elevations. The canyons are thought to have formed by erosion stimulated either by uplift of the area or a decline in the level of Ligeia Mare.

== See also ==
- Elivagar Flumina
- Saraswati Flumen
