= Flumen (planetary geology) =

Channel landform on other planets

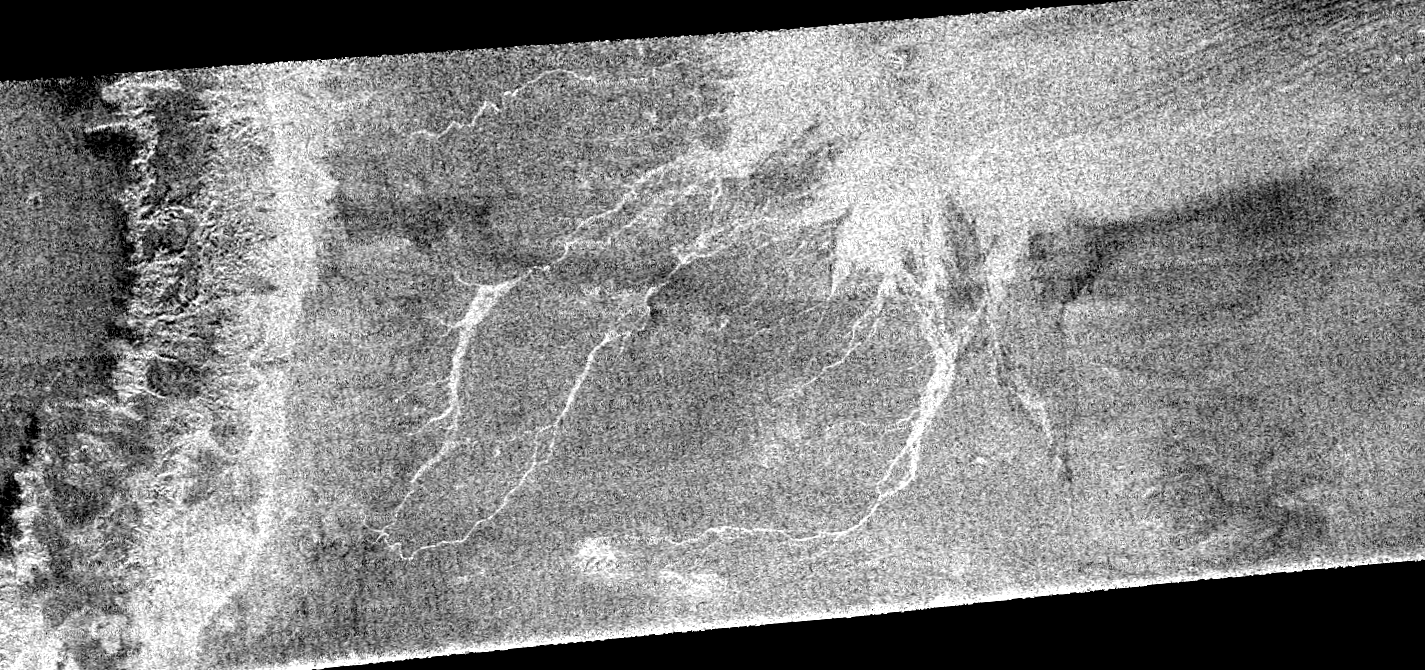
Elivagar Flumina on Titan

Flumen /ˈfluːmɛn/ (plural flumina) is the Latin word for river. It is used in planetary geology to name landform features on the Saturnian moon Titan.

A flumen is a channel on Titan that may carry liquid (usually hydrocarbons, like methane and ethane). Systems of linear, channel-like features on Titan are called flumina. Examples include Vid Flumina, a river of liquid methane and ethane about 400 km long, and Elivagar Flumina, a network of river channels in the region around the Menrva Crater of Titan.
