= Jani Radebaugh =

American planetary scientist

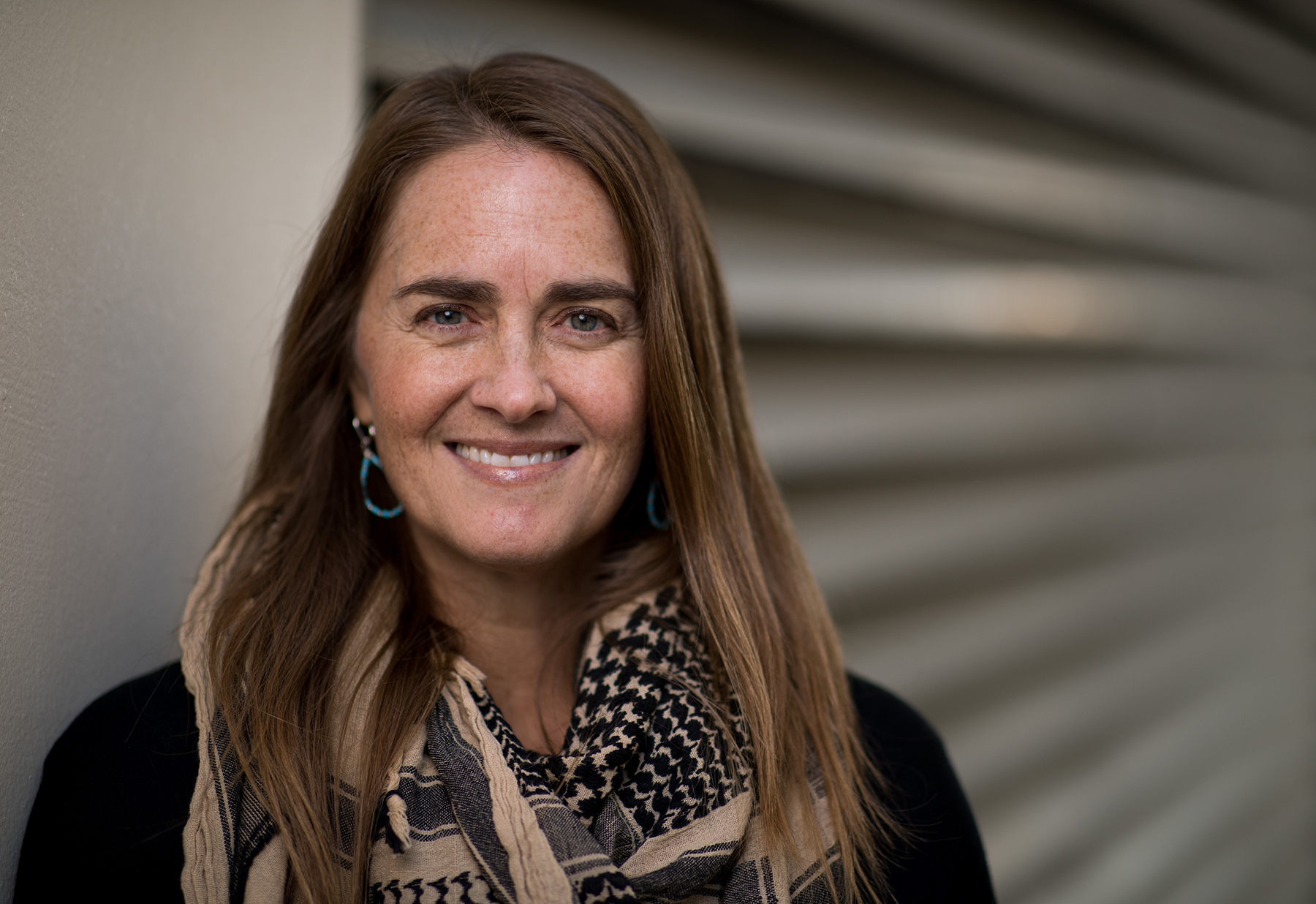
- Born: 1970 (age 55–56)
- Education: Brigham Young University (BS); University of Arizona (PhD)
- Scientific career
- Fields: Planetary science

Jani Radebaugh (/ˈdʒeɪni ˈrædəbɔː/; JAY-nee RAD-ə-baw) is an American planetary scientist and professor of geology at Brigham Young University who specializes in field studies of planets.

Radebaugh's research focuses on Saturn's moon Titan, Jupiter's moon Io, the Earth's Moon, Mars and Pluto. Radebaugh is a Science Team member of the Dragonfly mission to Titan, the IVO Io mission proposal, and the Mars Median project. She was an Associate Team Member of the Cassini-Huygens RADAR instrument from 2008 to 2017, and was a graduate student scientist for Io for the Galileo mission. She does science outreach through her work as an expert contributor to the Science/Discovery program How the Universe Works and other television and radio programs. In December 2012, Radebaugh and her colleagues on the Cassini mission announced the discovery of Vid Flumina, a liquid methane river on Saturn's moon Titan over 320 km (200 mi) long and resembling the Nile river.

== Career ==
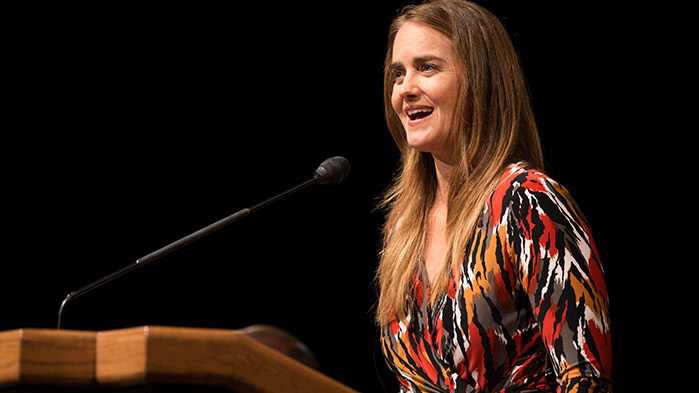
Jani Radebaugh at BYU in 2015

Radebaugh received a BS from Brigham Young University in Physics and Astronomy and a PhD from the University of Arizona in Planetary Science. She has been a professor of Geological Sciences at Brigham Young University since 2006 (full professor since 2019). She has conducted field research in terrestrial locations as Earth analogues for geological features on other worlds within the Solar System, including the Saharan, Arabian and Namib deserts to study giant sand dunes similar to those on Saturn's moon Titan, lava lakes in the Afar Valley, Vanuatu, and Kilauea as analogues for the active lava lakes of Jupiter's moon Io. She traveled to Iran's Lut Desert to study wind-carved ridges, termed yardangs, which are found on Mars, Venus and Titan and has spent four seasons (05–06, 08–09, 13–14, 16–17) in Antarctica with the U.S. Antarctic Search for Meteorites, where she helped recover meteorite samples from around the Solar System including the Moon and Mars.

She has analyzed data from the Cassini RADAR instrument and contributed to the formulation of the Dragonfly rotorcraft lander mission proposal. She was also involved in the Galileo mission, the Io Volcanoes Observer mission proposal, and the Median project for Mars.

Radebaugh has appeared as an expert contributor on several TV programs, including the Science/Discovery series How the Universe Works, and on BBC TV shows, NOVA episodes, and the Science Channel's, The Planets and Beyond.

== Awards and honors ==
In 2024, the asteroid 45690 Janiradebaugh was named after Radebaugh.

== Personal life ==
Radebaugh lives in Provo, Utah and is a member of the Church of Jesus Christ of Latter-day Saints. She was married in 2020.

== Inclusion ==
In November 2018, Radebaugh co-authored an article opposed to the American Geophysical Union (AGU) removal of a Brigham Young University job posting, following criticism of the university's hiring policy, which references its honor code, a portion of which prohibits homosexual behavior. Radebaugh supported the controversial posting's inclusion on AGU job boards, arguing that ideological diversity was important to a constructive dialogue about bias in hiring.
