= Taniquetil Montes =

Mountains on Titan

The Taniquetil Montes are a mountain range on Titan, the largest moon of the planet Saturn. The range is located near Titan's equator, between 2° and 4° south, and 211° and 214° west. It is located within the Adiri region, just west of the landing site of the Huygens probe.

The Taniquetil Montes are named after Taniquetil, a mountain in the Undying Lands in J. R. R. Tolkien's fictional universe. The name follows a convention that Titanian mountains are named after mountains in Tolkien's work. It was formally announced on November 13, 2012.
