= Misty Montes =

Mountains on Titan

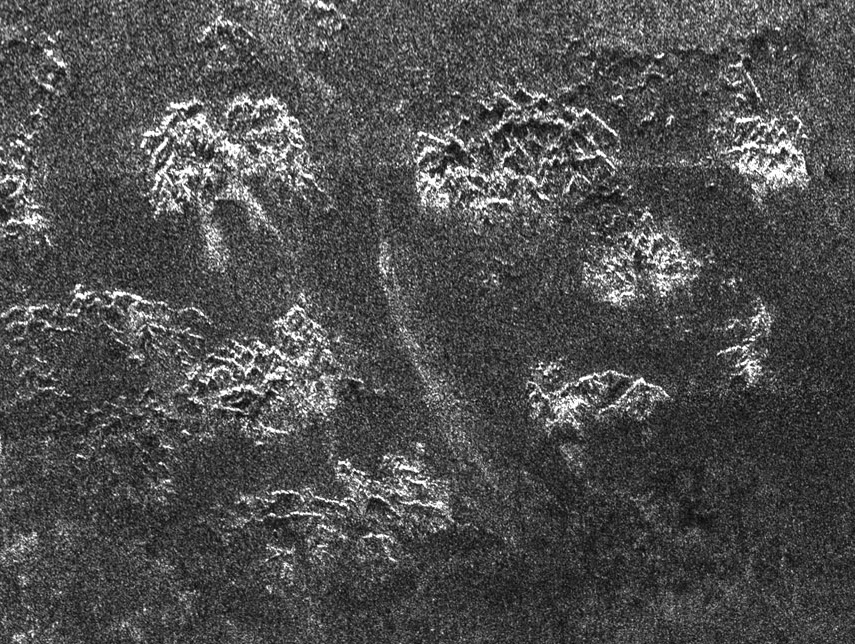
Misty Montes on Cassini radar image

The Misty Montes are a range of mountains on Titan, the largest moon of the planet Saturn. The range is located in the northern hemisphere of Titan, between 56–7° north and 61–3° west.

The Misty Montes are named after the Misty Mountains, a range of mountains in J. R. R. Tolkien's fictional world of Middle Earth which appears most prominently in The Hobbit. The name follows a convention that Titanean mountains are named after mountains in Tolkien's work. It was formally announced on November 13, 2012.
