= Titan-like exoplanet =

Type of exoplanet

A Titan-like exoplanet, Titan analog, exo-Titan or Titanic planet is an exoplanet like Saturn's moon Titan with a thick hazy atmosphere and cold enough for liquid hydrocarbons to exist on the surface. Titan takes about 30 years to orbit the Sun but at the same temperature around an M dwarf a titan-like planet would take 2 years to orbit which is much easier to detect.
