= Irensaga Montes =

Mountains on Titan

The Irensaga Montes is a range of mountains on Titan, the largest moon of the planet Saturn. The range is located near Titan's equator, between 5–6° south and 210–214° east. It is located within the Adiri region, just west of the landing site of the Huygens probe.

The Irensaga Montes is named after Irensaga, one of the White Mountains in J. R. R. Tolkien's fictional world of Middle-earth. The name follows a convention that Titanean mountains are after mountains in Tolkien's work. It was formally announced on November 13, 2012.
