= Sotra Patera =

Feature on Titan

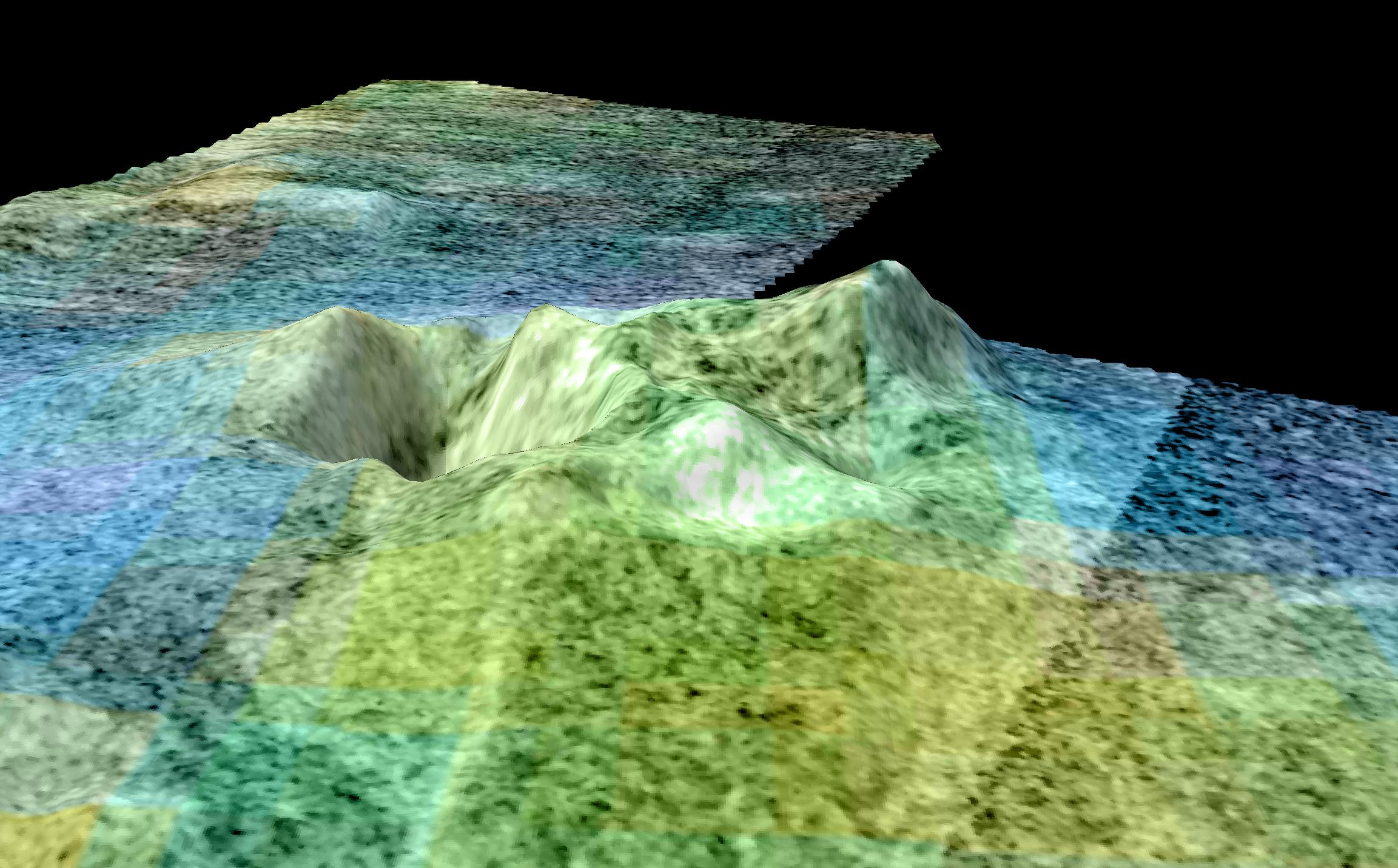
- Stereoscopic map of Sotra Patera and Doom Mons. Height is exaggerated by a factor of 10. The colours are false.
- Feature type: Patera (planetary nomenclature)
- Coordinates: 12.5°S 39.8°W
- Diameter: 235 km (146 mi)
- Eponym: Sotra, Norway

Sotra Patera (named after Sotra island in Norway) is a prominent depression on Titan, the largest moon of Saturn. It was formerly known as Sotra Facula; the current name was approved on 19 December 2012. It is a possible cryovolcanic caldera 30 km (19 mi) across and 1.7 km (1.1 mi) deep, and is immediately to the east of the largest putative cryovolcanic mountain on Titan, the 1.45 km (0.90 mi) high Doom Mons. Sotra Patera is the deepest known pit on Titan.

The ice volcano or cryovolcano Doom Mons forms a roughly circular mountain measuring about 65 kilometres (40 mi) across. It has two peaks standing about 1,000 metres (3,300 ft) and 1,450 metres (4,760 ft) high with multiple craters, with Sotra Patera at 1,700 metres (5,600 ft) being the deepest. Finger-like flows are visible on the flanks of the mountain, measuring perhaps 100 metres (330 ft) thick.

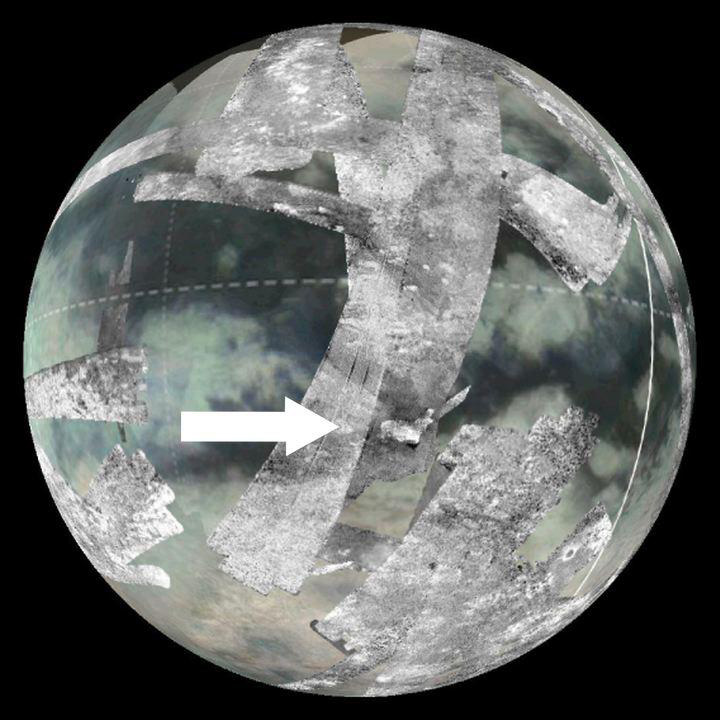
Global view of Titan showing the location of Sotra Patera

The Cassini–Huygens mission has mapped Sotra Patera using the Cassini orbiter's onboard radar instrument and the visual and infrared mapping spectrometer. An earlier survey of the region in 2004 revealed a circular bright spot, or facula, which was nicknamed "The Rose". A subsequent flyby by Cassini re-surveyed the region from a different angle, enabling members of the US Geological Survey Astrogeology Science Center to generate stereoscopic mapping of Sotra Patera and the surrounding area. Researchers also discovered at least two more mountains and another big crater, forming a chain of mountains several hundred kilometers long flanked by lava-covered lowlands.

With Doom Mons, Sotra Patera is regarded as "the very best evidence, by far, for volcanic topography anywhere documented on an icy satellite", according to planetary scientist Jeffrey Kargel of the University of Arizona. It has been compared with terrestrial volcanoes such as Etna, Laki and volcanic cones near Flagstaff, Arizona. There is as yet no evidence of current activity, but researchers plan to monitor the area for changes.

It is unclear what might have been erupted from Sotra Patera—possibly water mixed with ammonium, or more exotic hydrocarbon compounds such as polyethylene, paraffin waxes or asphalt. The eruptions may also have brought methane to the surface. Titan's dense methane atmosphere is constantly being broken down by sunlight in the upper atmosphere through photolysis; cryovolcanism may therefore explain how the atmosphere is being replenished.

The eruptions of Sotra Patera are presumed to originate in a layer of liquid water lying below Titan's icy crust. The mountain's heavily cratered appearance indicates that it must have erupted with considerable force, but the precise mechanism by which this happened is not certain. Liquid water is ordinarily denser than ice but it is possible that the water's density may be reduced by mixing with other substances, such as ammonia, allowing it to force its way to the surface. Alternatively, some other mechanism such as the underground formation of methane bubbles or a build-up of tectonic pressure may be responsible.
