= Elivagar Flumina =

Network of river channels on Titan

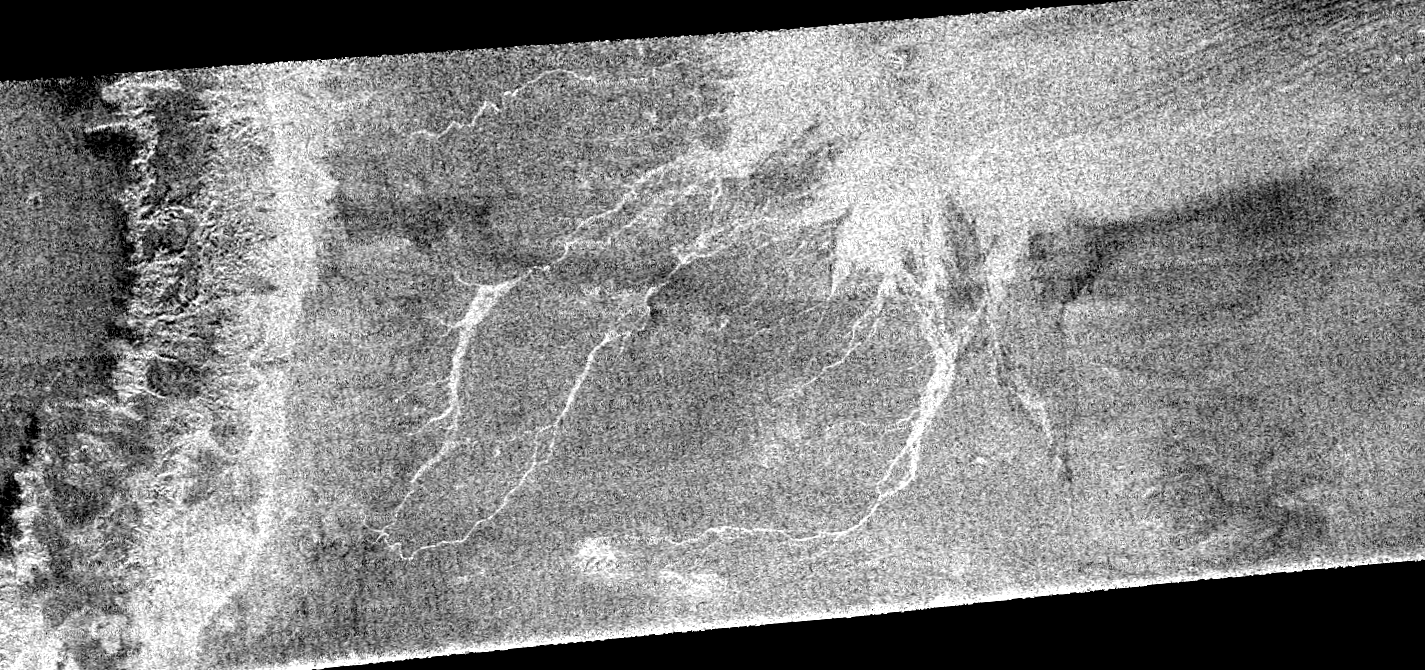

Elivagar Flumina is a network of river channels, known as flumina, located in the region around the Menrva Crater of Titan. These channels range in length from 23 km to 210 km and are at least 120 km wide, showing signs of erosion. At their mouth, an alluvial fan is present. The Elivagar Flumina is interpreted as alluvial due to its proximity to fluvial valleys and radar backscattering. Geomorphic mapping of the Menrva region on Titan has provided evidence of exogenic processes such as hydrocarbon fluid channelization, or flash floods, which are believed to have formed the Flumina network.

The Elivagar Flumina is named after the Élivágar, a group of poisonous ice rivers in Norse mythology.
