= Erebor Mons =

Mountain on Titan

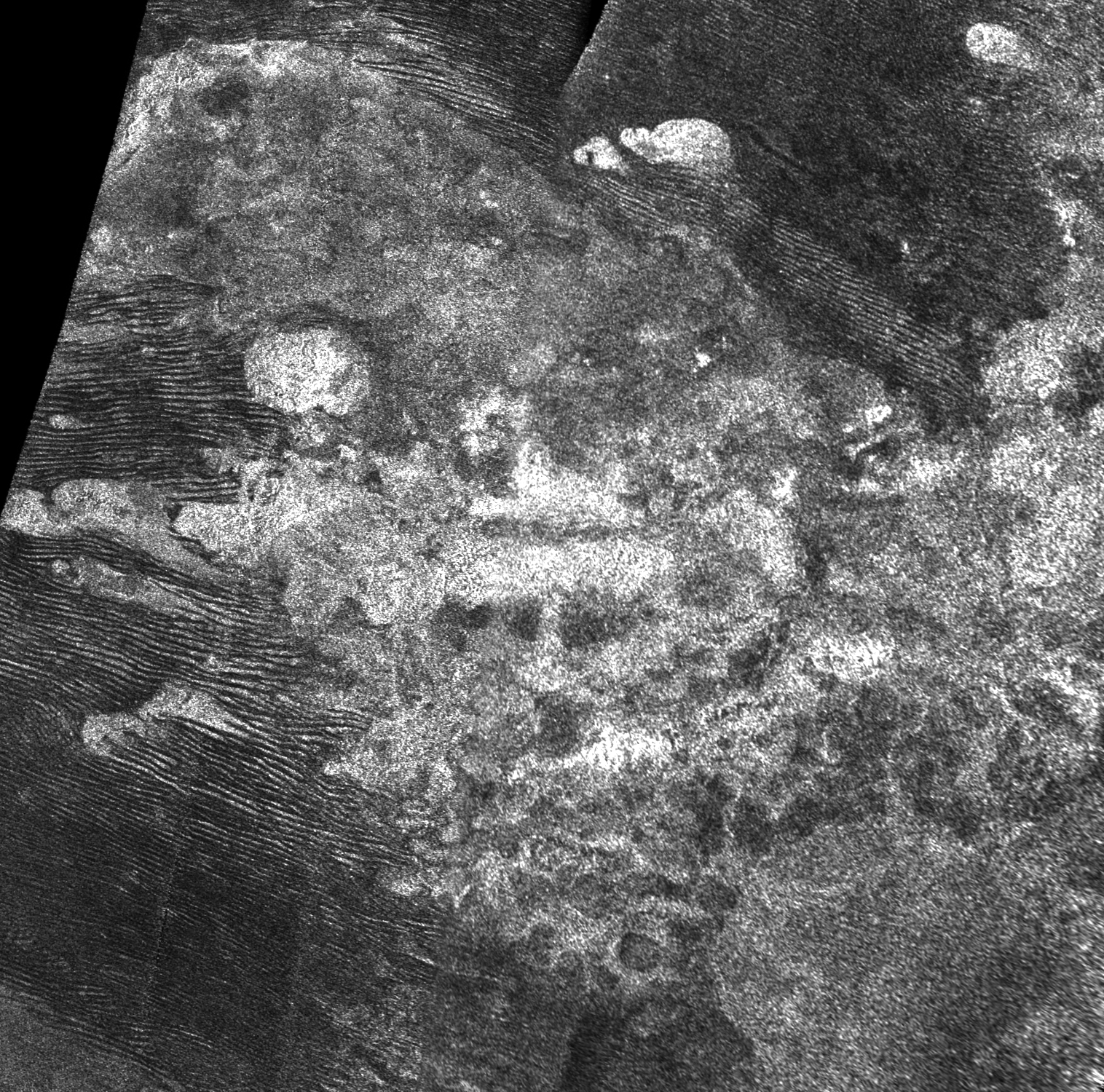
Cassini radar image (dark streaks are dunes)

Erebor Mons is a mountain on Titan, the largest moon of the planet Saturn. It is located near Titan's equator, between 4–5° south and 35–36° west, centered on 4.97°S 36.23°W, in the western part of Quivira region. It is 40 km across, more than 1 km high, and has lobate flow features to its north and east. It is probably a cryovolcano. Erebor Mons is situated about 470 km to the north-northeast of a larger cryovolcanic construct, Doom Mons.

Erebor Mons is one of the highest known mountains of Titan, but it is not readily discernible on radar or infrared images. It was discovered only when stereoscopic radar data allowed the construction of an elevation map. It was imaged by Cassini radar 22 February and 10 April 2007.

Erebor Mons is named after Erebor, the "Lonely Mountain" that appears in J. R. R. Tolkien's fictional world of Middle-earth, most prominently in The Hobbit. The name follows a convention that Titanean Mountains are named after mountains in Tolkien's work. The name was formally announced on November 13, 2012.

== See also ==
- List of geological features on Titan
