= Menrva (crater) =

Largest crater on Titan

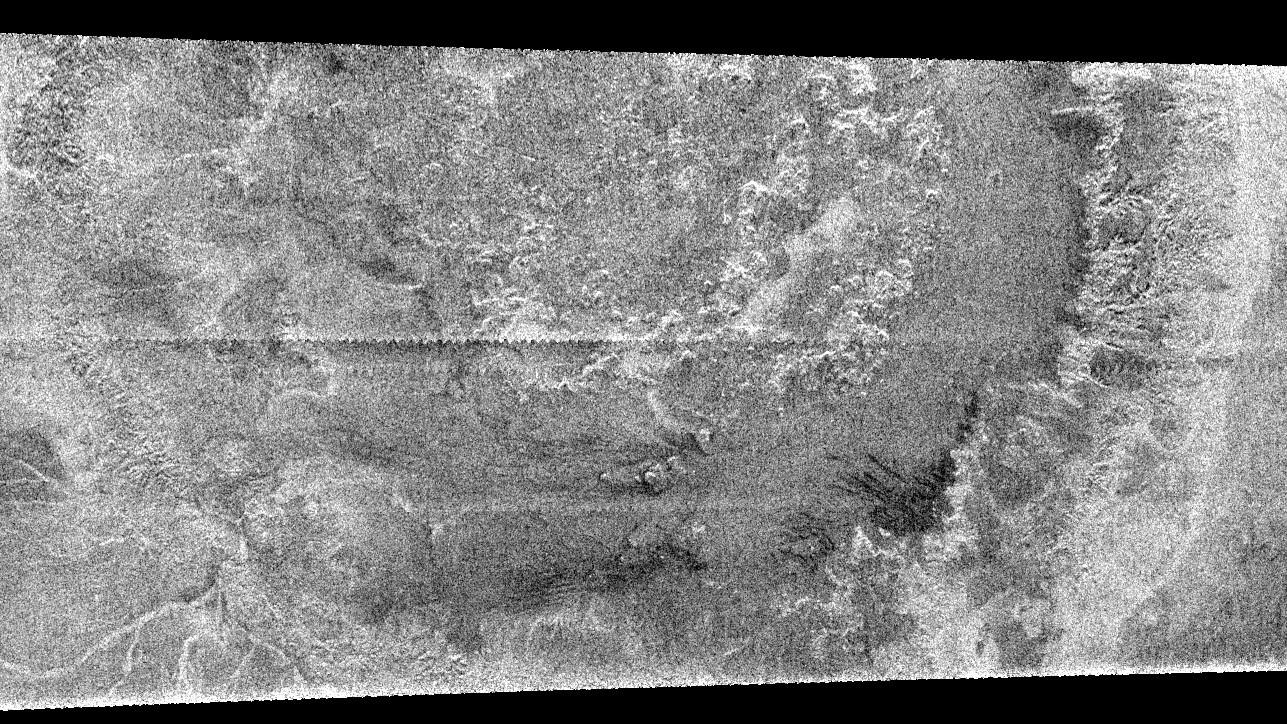
- Cassini view of a portion of Menrva, taken on February 15, 2005
- Feature type: Impact crater
- Coordinates: 20.1°N 87.2°W
- Diameter: 392 km
- Eponym: Menrva

Menrva is the largest crater on Titan, with a diameter of 392 kilometers. The crater is a heavily eroded double ringed impact basin, similar to the impact related features of Mars and Mercury. This is evident by Menrva's distinct lack of a central peak, indicating modification of the crater's surface since formation. It has been estimated that Menrva is approximately 2.8 kilometers deep.

A network of channels known as Elivagar Flumina flow away from the crest of the crater into a catchment basin.

The feature is named after the goddess of wisdom in Etruscan mythology, Menrva.
