= Titan (moon) =

Largest moon of Saturn

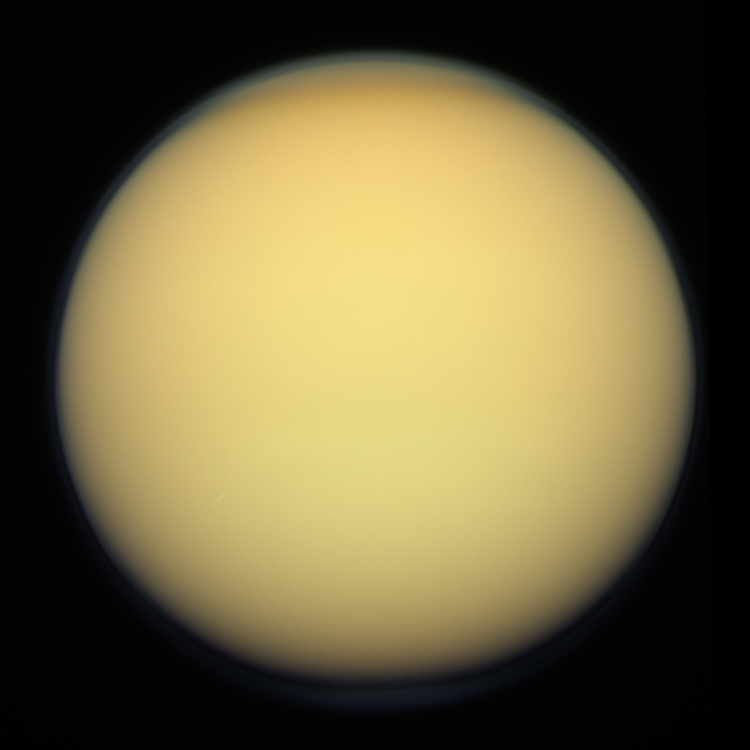
- Titan, imaged by the Cassini orbiter, December 2011. A thick shroud of organic haze permanently obscures Titan's surface from viewing in visible light.

Discovery
- Discovered by: Christiaan Huygens
- Discovery date: March 25, 1655

Designations
- Designation: Saturn VI
- Pronunciation: /ˈtaɪtən/
- Named after: Τῑτάν Tītan
- Adjectives: Titanian or Titanean (both /taɪˈteɪniən/) (Note: "Titanian" is the written adjectival form of both Titan and Uranus's moon Titania. However, Uranus's moon has a Shakespearean pronunciation with a short "i" vowel and the "a" of spa: /tɪˈtɑːniən/, while either spelling for Titan is pronounced with those two vowels long: /taɪˈteɪniən/.)

Orbital characteristics
- Periapsis: 1186680 km
- Apoapsis: 1257060 km
- Semi-major axis: 1221870 km
- Eccentricity: 0.0288
- Orbital period (sidereal): 15.945448 d
- Inclination: 0.34854° (to Saturn's equator)
- Satellite of: Saturn

Physical characteristics
- Dimensions: 5150.248 × 5149.492 × 5148.828 km (± 0.052 × 0.090 × 0.056 km)
- Mean radius: 2574.765±0.018 km (0.404 Earths)
- Surface area: 8.33×10^{7} km^{2} (0.163 Earths)
- Volume: 7.16×10^{10} km^{3} (0.066 Earths)
- Mass: (1.345180354±0.000030232)×10^{23} kg (0.0225 Earths)
- Mean density: 1.8814±0.0001 g/cm^{3}
- Surface gravity: 1.352 m/s^{2} (0.138 g)
- Moment of inertia factor: 0.343±0.001
- Escape velocity: 2.641 km/s
- Synodic rotation period: Synchronous
- Axial tilt: 0.32°±0.02° (to the orbital plane); 27° (to the sun)
- Albedo: 0.22 (geometric); 0.265±0.03 (Bond)
- Temperature: 93.7 K (−179.5 °C)
- Apparent magnitude: 8.2 to 9.0

Atmosphere
- Surface pressure: 146.7 kPa (1.45 atm)
- Composition by volume: Variable Stratosphere: 98.4% nitrogen (N_{2}), 1.4% methane (CH_{4}), 0.2% hydrogen (H_{2}); Lower troposphere: 95.0% N_{2}, 4.9% CH_{4}; 97% N_{2}, 2.7±0.1% CH_{4}, 0.1–0.2% H_{2}

Titan is the largest moon of Saturn and the second largest in the Solar System. It is the only moon that is known to have a dense atmosphere (denser than that of Earth), and is the only known object in the Solar System besides Earth with stable bodies of surface liquid today. Titan is one of seven gravitationally rounded moons of Saturn, and is the second-most distant among them. Frequently described as a planet-like moon, Titan is 48.16% larger in diameter than Earth's moon, and 80% more massive. It is the second-largest moon in the Solar System after Jupiter's Ganymede, and is larger than Mercury, and yet Titan is only 40% as massive as Mercury, because Mercury is mainly iron and rock, whereas Titan is mostly ice, which is less dense.

Discovered in 1655 by the Dutch astronomer Christiaan Huygens, Titan was the first known moon of Saturn and the sixth known planetary satellite (after Earth's moon and the four Galilean moons of Jupiter). Titan orbits Saturn at 20 Saturn radii or 1.2 million km above Saturn's apparent surface. From Titan's surface, Saturn, disregarding its rings, subtends an arc of 5.09 degrees, rendering it more than ten times as large in Titan's sky as the Moon is in Earth's sky.

Titan is primarily composed of ice and rocky material, with a rocky core surrounded by various layers of ice, including a crust of ice I_{h} and a subsurface layer of ammonia-rich liquid water. Much as with Venus before the Space Age, the dense opaque atmosphere prevented understanding of Titan's surface until the Cassini–Huygens mission in 2004 provided new information, including the discovery of liquid hydrocarbon lakes in Titan's polar regions and the discovery of its atmospheric super-rotation. The geologically young surface is generally smooth, with few impact craters, although mountains and several possible cryovolcanoes have been found.

The atmosphere of Titan is mainly nitrogen and methane; minor components lead to the formation of hydrocarbon clouds and heavy organonitrogen haze. Its climate, including wind and rain, creates surface features similar to those of Earth, such as dunes, rivers, lakes, seas (probably of liquid methane and ethane), and deltas, and is dominated by seasonal weather patterns as on Earth. With its liquids (both surface and subsurface) and robust nitrogen atmosphere, Titan's methane cycle nearly resembles Earth's water cycle, albeit at a much lower temperature of about 94 K (−179 °C; −290 °F). Due to these factors, Titan is sometimes called the most Earth-like celestial object in the Solar System.

== Discovery and naming ==
Christiaan Huygens discovered Titan in 1655.

The Dutch astronomer Christiaan Huygens discovered Titan on March 25, 1655. Fascinated by Galileo's 1610 discovery of Jupiter's four largest moons and his advancements in telescope technology, Huygens, with the help of his elder brother Constantijn Huygens Jr., began building telescopes around 1650, and discovered the first observed moon orbiting Saturn with one of the telescopes they built.

Huygens named his discovery Saturni Luna (or Luna Saturni, Latin for "moon of Saturn"), publishing in the 1655 tract De Saturni Luna Observatio Nova (A New Observation of Saturn's Moon). After Giovanni Domenico Cassini published his discoveries of four more moons of Saturn between 1673 and 1686, astronomers began referring to these and Titan as Saturn I through V (with Titan then in fourth position). Other early epithets for Titan include "Saturn's ordinary satellite". The International Astronomical Union officially numbers Titan as "Saturn VI".

The name Titan, and the names of all seven satellites of Saturn which were known at the time, came from John Herschel (son of William Herschel, who had discovered two other moons of Saturn, namely Mimas and Enceladus), in his 1847 publication Results of Astronomical Observations Made during the Years 1834, 5, 6, 7, 8, at the Cape of Good Hope. Numerous small moons have been discovered around Saturn since then. Saturn's moons are named after mythological figures. The name Titan derives from the Titans, a generation of deities who preceded the Olympian gods in Greek mythology.

Planetary moons other than Earth's were never given symbols in the astronomical literature. Denis Moskowitz, a software engineer who designed most of the dwarf planet symbols, proposed a Greek tau (the initial of Titan) combined with the crook of the Saturn symbol as the symbol of Titan. This symbol is not widely used.

== Formation ==
• Animated globe of Saturn's moon Titan, based on official NASA 3D model data.

The regular moons of Jupiter and Saturn likely formed via co-accretion, similar to the process believed to have formed the planets in the Solar System. As the young gas giants formed, they were surrounded by discs of material that gradually coalesced into moons. While the four Galilean moons of Jupiter exist in highly regular, planet-like orbits, Titan overwhelmingly dominates Saturn's system, and has a high orbital eccentricity which is not immediately explained by co-accretion alone. A proposed model for the formation of Titan is that Saturn's system began with a group of moons which were similar to Jupiter's Galilean moons, but that they were disrupted by a series of giant impacts, which would go on to form Titan. Saturn's mid-sized moons, such as Iapetus and Rhea, were formed from the debris of these collisions. Such a violent beginning would also explain Titan's orbital eccentricity. A 2014 analysis of Titan's atmospheric nitrogen suggested that it was possibly sourced from material which is similar to that found in the Oort cloud, and not from sources which were present during the co-accretion of materials around Saturn.

Titan may have played a critical role in the formation of Hyperion. Numerical simulations suggest that a mid-sized satellite of Saturn collided with Titan a few hundred million years ago, and the resulting debris accreted to form Hyperion.

== Orbit and rotation ==
Titan's orbit (highlighted in red) among the other large inner moons of Saturn. The moons outside its orbit are (from the outside to the inside) Iapetus and Hyperion; those inside are Rhea, Dione, Tethys, Enceladus, and Mimas.

Titan orbits Saturn once every 15 days and 22 hours. Like Earth's moon and many of the satellites of the giant planets, Titan is tidally locked in synchronous rotation with Saturn, and permanently shows one face to the planet. Consequently, its rotational period, or day, is identical to its orbital period. Its orbital eccentricity is 0.0288, and the orbital plane is inclined 0.33 degrees relative to the Saturnian equator.

The small and irregularly shaped satellite Hyperion is locked in a 3:4 orbital resonance with Titan—that is, Hyperion orbits three times for every four times Titan orbits. Hyperion probably formed in a stable orbital island, whereas the massive Titan absorbed or ejected any other bodies that made close approaches.

== Bulk characteristics ==
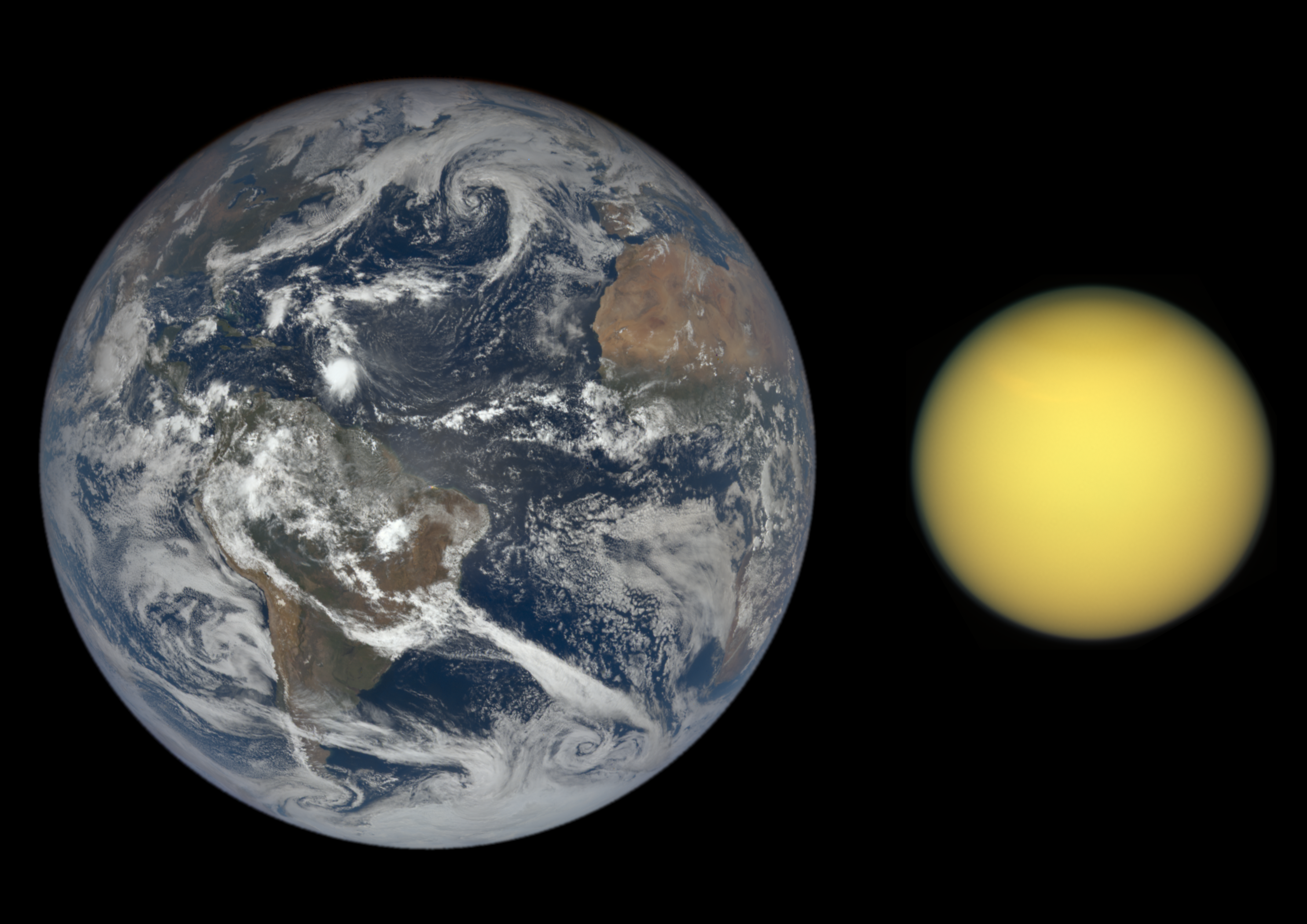
Size comparison: Earth (left) and Titan (right). Titan's apparent size includes its extended atmospheric haze.

A model of Titan's internal structure showing ice-six layer

Titan is 5,149.53 km (3,199.77 mi) in diameter; it is 6% larger than the planet Mercury and 50% larger than Earth's Moon. Titan is the tenth-largest object known in the Solar system, including the Sun. Before the arrival of Voyager 1 in 1980, Titan was thought to be slightly larger than Ganymede, which has a diameter of 5,268.2 km (3,273.5 mi), and thus the largest moon in the Solar System. This was an overestimation caused by Titan's dense, opaque atmosphere, with a haze layer 100–200 km above its surface. This increases its apparent diameter. Titan's diameter and mass (and thus its density) are similar to those of the Jovian moons Ganymede and Callisto. Based on its bulk density of 1.881 g/cm^{3}, Titan's composition is 40–60% rock, with the rest being water ice and other materials.

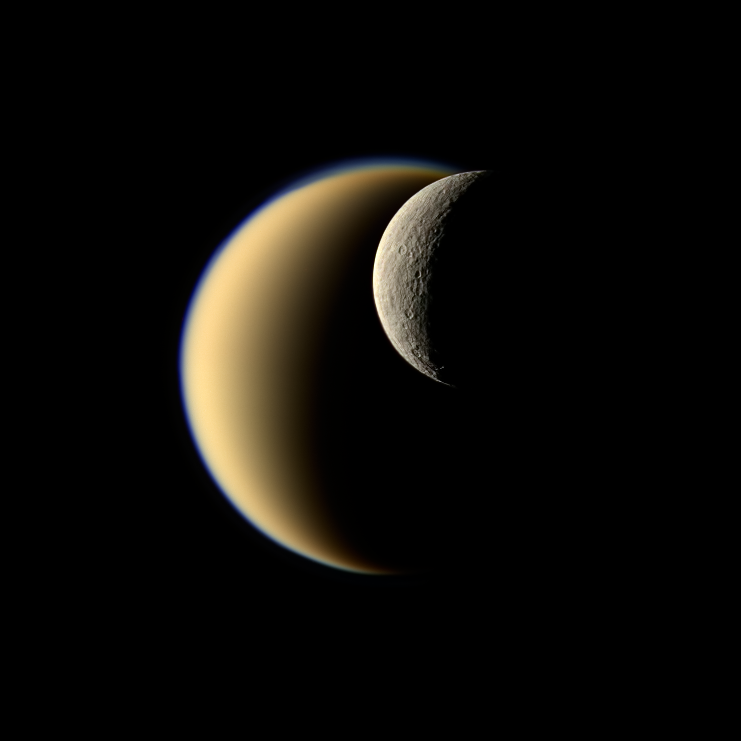
Titan dwarfs all the other large moons in the Saturn system. The next largest moon, Rhea, is only a third the radius the size of Titan itself

Titan is probably partially differentiated into distinct layers with a 3,400 km (2,100 mi) rocky center. This rocky center is believed to be surrounded by several layers composed of different crystalline forms of ice, and/or water. The exact structure depends heavily on the heat flux from within Titan itself, which is poorly constrained. The interior may still be hot enough for a liquid layer consisting of a "magma" composed of water and ammonia between the ice I_{h} (normal ice) crust and deeper ice layers made of high-pressure forms of ice. It is even possible that there is no high-pressure ice layer, the outer part of the moon instead consisting primarily of liquid water underneath a surface crust of ordinary ice. The presence of ammonia allows water to remain liquid even at a temperature as low as 176 K (−97 °C) (for eutectic mixture with water).

The Cassini probe discovered evidence for the layered structure in the form of natural extremely low-frequency radio waves in Titan's atmosphere. Titan's surface is thought to be a poor reflector of extremely low-frequency radio waves, so they may instead be reflecting off the liquid–ice boundary of a subsurface ocean. Surface features were observed by the Cassini spacecraft to systematically shift by up to 30 km (19 mi) between October 2005 and May 2007, which suggests that the crust is decoupled from the interior, and provides additional evidence for an interior liquid layer. Further supporting evidence for a liquid layer and ice shell decoupled from the solid core comes from the way the gravity field varies as Titan orbits Saturn. Comparison of the gravity field with the RADAR-based topography observations also suggests that the ice shell may be substantially rigid.

== Atmosphere ==
Vertical diagram of Titan's atmosphere

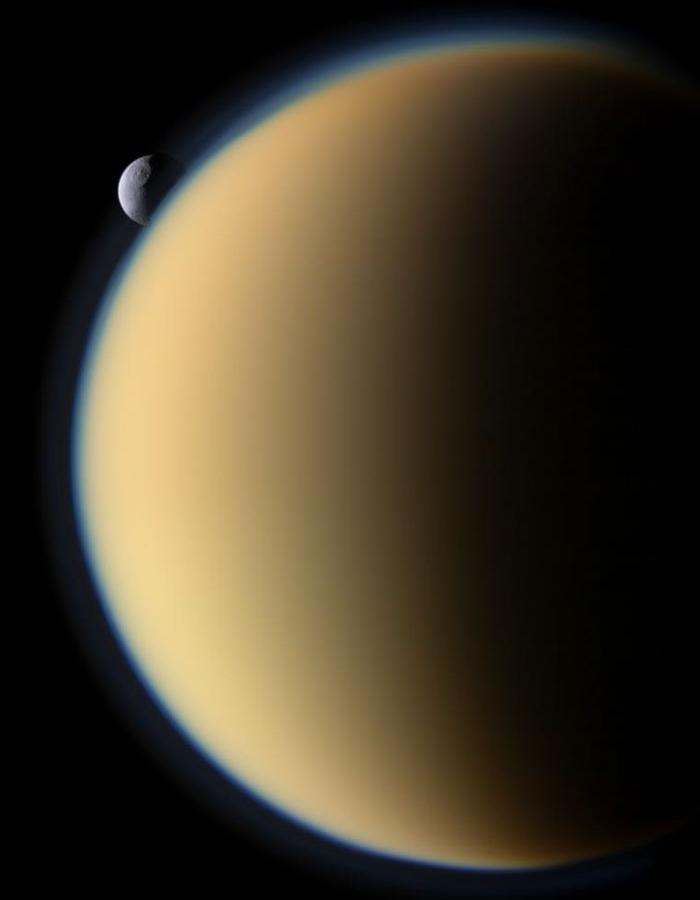
Titan's orange color comes from a thick atmospheric haze created by sunlight breaking down methane and nitrogen. Tethys can be seen in the background.

Titan is the only moon in the Solar System with an atmosphere denser than Earth's, with a surface pressure of 1.448 atm, and it is one of only two moons whose atmospheres are able to support clouds, hazes, and weather—the other being Neptune's moon Triton. The presence of a significant atmosphere was first suspected by astronomer Josep Comas i Solà, who observed distinct limb darkening on Titan in 1903. Due to the extensive, hazy atmosphere, Titan was once thought to be the largest moon in the Solar System until the Voyager missions revealed that Ganymede is slightly larger. The haze also shrouded Titan's surface from view, so direct images of its surface could not be taken until the Cassini–Huygens mission in 2004.

The primary constituents of Titan's atmosphere are nitrogen, methane, and hydrogen. The precise atmospheric composition varies depending on altitude and latitude due to methane cycling between a gas and a liquid in Titan's lower atmosphere—the methane cycle. Nitrogen is the most abundant gas, with a concentration of around 98.6% in the stratosphere that decreases to 95.1% in the troposphere. Direct observations by the Huygens probe determined that methane concentrations are highest near the surface, with a concentration of 4.92% that remains relatively constant up to 8 km (5 mi) above the surface. Methane concentrations then gradually decrease with increasing altitude, down to a concentration of 1.41% in the stratosphere. Methane also increases in concentration near Titan's winter pole, probably due to evaporation from the surface in high-latitude regions. Hydrogen is the third-most abundant gas, with a concentration of around 0.1%. There are trace amounts of other hydrocarbons, such as ethane, diacetylene, methylacetylene, acetylene, and propane, and other gases, such as cyanoacetylene, hydrogen cyanide, carbon dioxide, carbon monoxide, cyanogen, argon, and helium. The hydrocarbons are thought to form in Titan's upper atmosphere in reactions resulting from the breakup of methane by the Sun's ultraviolet light, producing a thick orange smog.

Energy from the Sun should have converted all traces of methane in Titan's atmosphere into more complex hydrocarbons within 50 million years—a short time compared to the age of the Solar System. This suggests that methane must be replenished by a reservoir on or within Titan itself. The ultimate origin of the methane in its atmosphere may be its interior, released via eruptions from cryovolcanoes. One proposed candidate for this interior reservoir is methane hydrate, or "methane-filled ice," within Titan's icy shell. Methane hydrate has been shown experimentally to remain stable at pressures relevant to Titan's interior, with a filled ice phase persisting to at least 2 GPa, and a further, denser filled-ice phase found to remain stable to at least 150 GPa — well beyond the pressures found within Titan — suggesting such hydrate layers could survive throughout the moon's icy mantle and act as a long-term methane source. On April 3, 2013, NASA reported that complex organic chemicals, collectively called tholins, likely arise on Titan, based on studies simulating the atmosphere of Titan. On June 6, 2013, scientists at the IAA-CSIC reported the detection of polycyclic aromatic hydrocarbons in the upper atmosphere of Titan.

On September 30, 2013, propene was detected in the atmosphere of Titan by NASA's Cassini spacecraft, using its composite infrared spectrometer (CIRS). This is the first time propene has been found on any moon or planet other than Earth and is the first chemical found by the CIRS. The detection of propene fills a mysterious gap in observations that date back to NASA's Voyager 1 spacecraft's first close planetary flyby of Titan in 1980, during which it was discovered that many of the gases that make up Titan's brown haze were hydrocarbons, theoretically formed via the recombination of radicals created by the Sun's ultraviolet photolysis of methane.

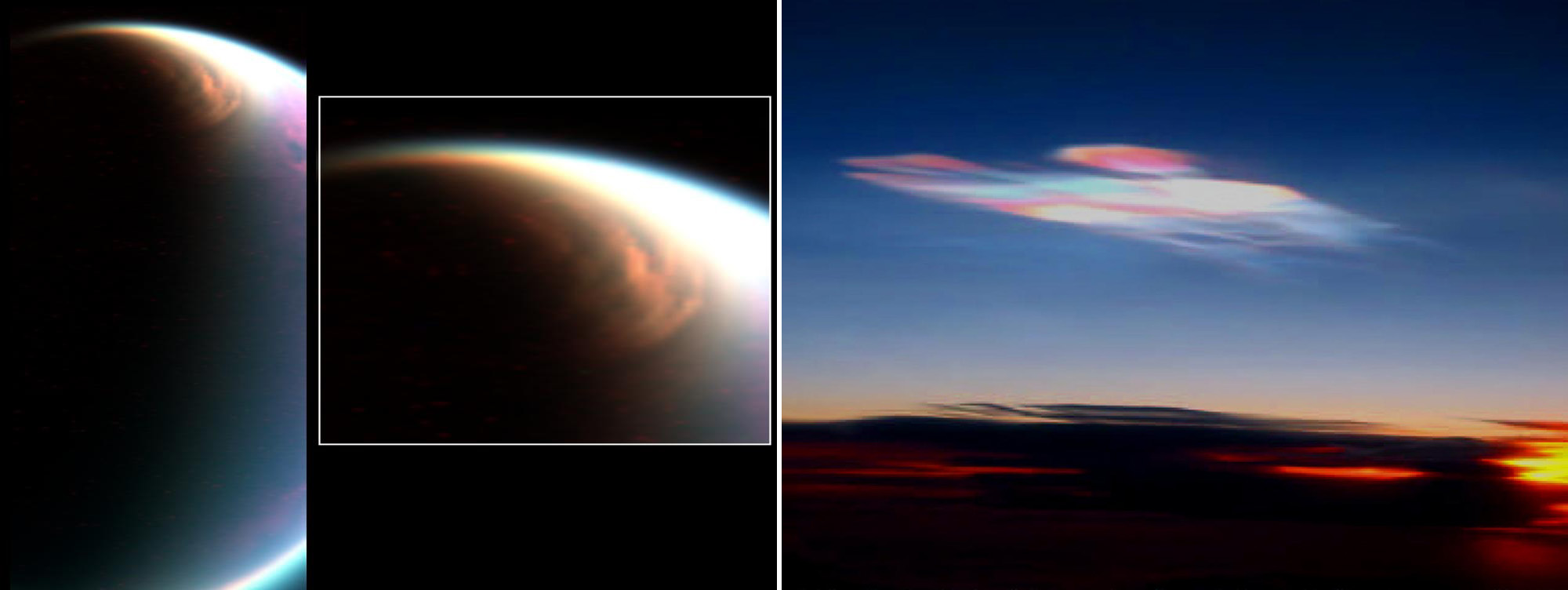
Polar clouds, made of methane, on Titan (left) compared with polar clouds on Earth (right), which are made of water or water ice

=== Climate ===
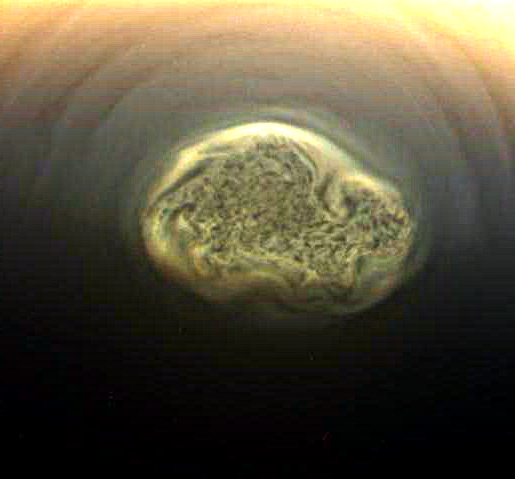
Atmospheric polar vortex over Titan's south pole

Titan's surface temperature is about 94 K (−179.2 °C). At this temperature, water ice has an extremely low vapor pressure, so the little water vapor present appears limited to the stratosphere. Titan receives about 1% as much sunlight as Earth. Before sunlight reaches the surface, about 90% has been absorbed by the thick atmosphere, leaving only 0.1% of the amount of light Earth receives.

Atmospheric methane creates a greenhouse effect on Titan's surface, without which Titan would be much colder. Conversely, haze in Titan's atmosphere contributes to an anti-greenhouse effect by absorbing sunlight, canceling a portion of the greenhouse effect and making its surface significantly colder than its upper atmosphere.

The Winds of Titan
A recording of winds of Titan

Methane clouds (animated; July 2014)

Titan's clouds, probably composed of methane, ethane or other simple organics, are scattered and variable, punctuating the overall haze. The findings of the Huygens probe indicate that Titan's atmosphere periodically rains liquid methane and other organic compounds onto its surface.

Clouds typically cover 1% of Titan's disk, though outburst events have been observed in which the cloud cover rapidly expands to as much as 8%. One hypothesis asserts that the southern clouds are formed when heightened levels of sunlight during the southern summer generate uplift in the atmosphere, resulting in convection. This explanation is complicated by the fact that cloud formation has been observed not only after the southern summer solstice but also during mid-spring. Increased methane humidity at the south pole possibly contributes to the rapid increases in cloud size. It was summer in Titan's southern hemisphere until 2010, when Saturn's orbit, which governs Titan's motion, moved Titan's northern hemisphere into the sunlight. When the seasons switch, it is expected that ethane will begin to condense over the south pole.

== Surface features ==
Global map of Titan – with IAU labels (2025)

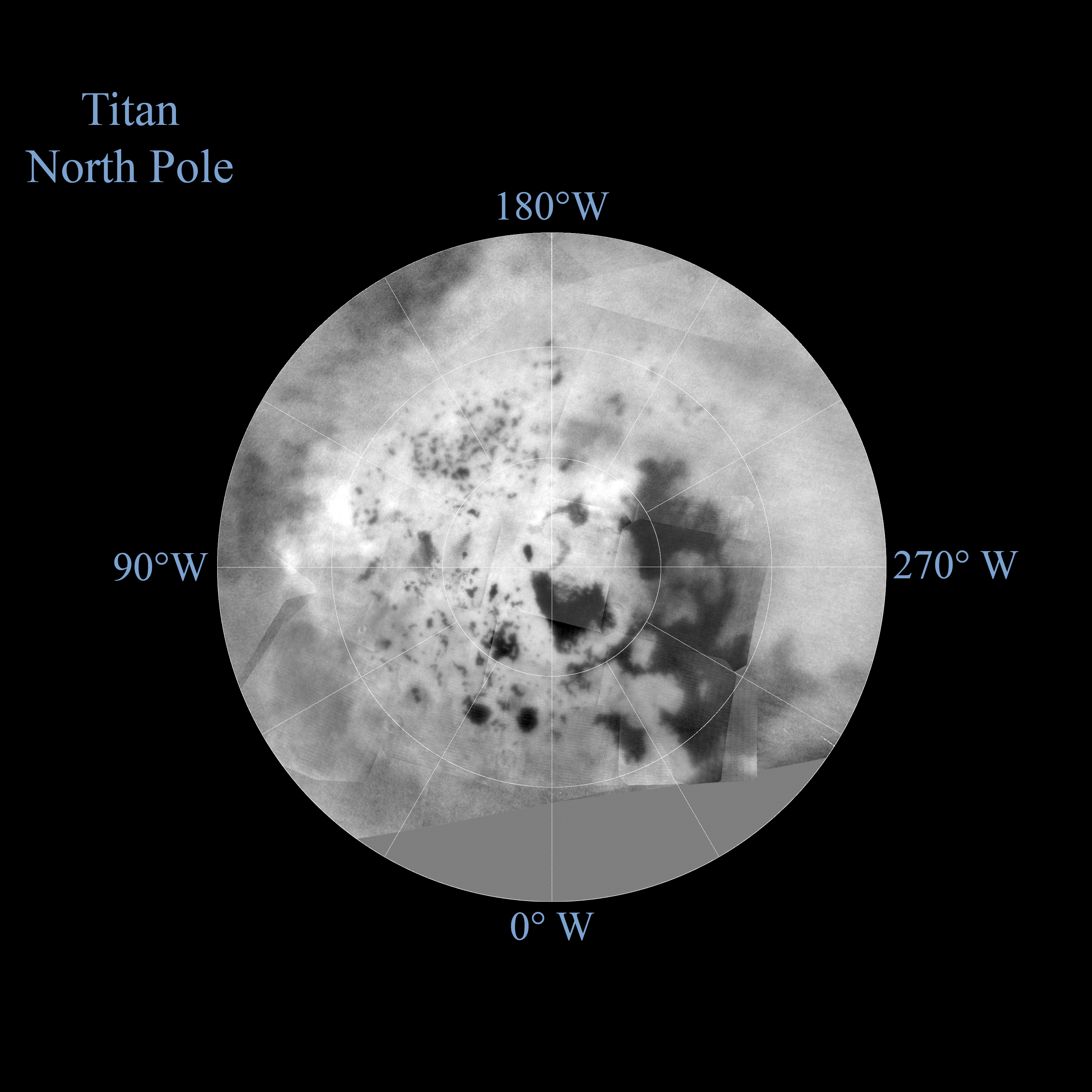
Titan's North Pole (2014)

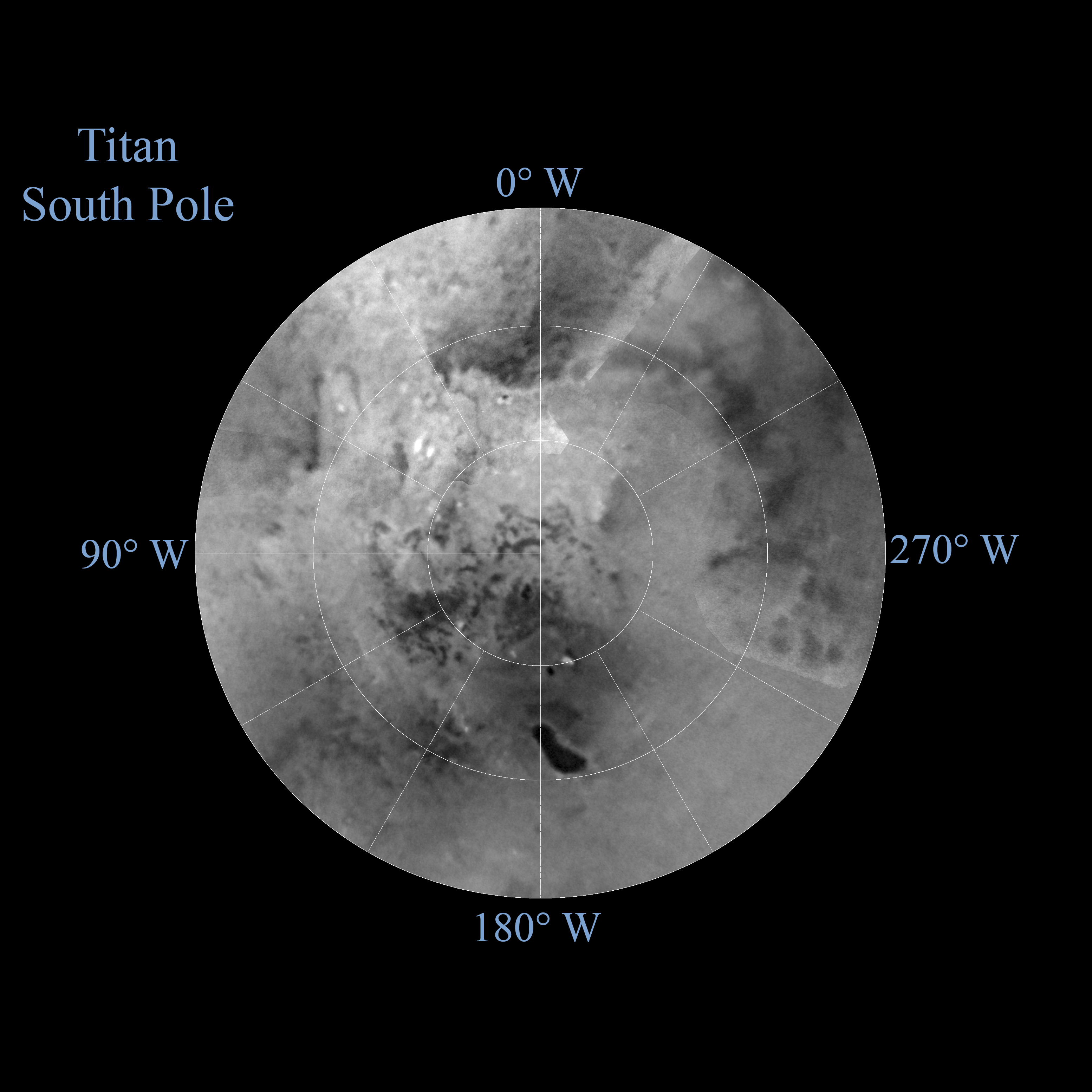
Titan's South Pole (2014)

The surface of Titan has been described as "complex, fluid-processed, [and] geologically young". Titan has been around since the Solar System's formation, but its surface is much younger, between 100 million and 1 billion years old. Geological processes may have reshaped Titan's surface. Titan's atmosphere is four times as thick as Earth's, making it difficult for astronomical instruments to image its surface in the visible light spectrum. The Cassini spacecraft used infrared instruments, radar altimetry and synthetic aperture radar (SAR) imaging to map portions of Titan during its close fly-bys. The first images revealed a diverse geology, with both rough and smooth areas. There are features that may be volcanic in origin, disgorging water mixed with ammonia onto the surface. There is also evidence that Titan's ice shell may be substantially rigid, which would suggest little geologic activity. There are also streaky features, some of them hundreds of kilometers in length, that appear to be caused by windblown particles. Examination has also shown the surface to be relatively smooth; the few features that seem to be impact craters appeared to have been partially filled in, perhaps by raining hydrocarbons or cryovolcanism. Radar altimetry suggests topographical variation is low, typically no more than 150 meters. Occasional elevation changes of 500 meters have been discovered and Titan has mountains that sometimes reach several hundred meters to more than one kilometer in height.

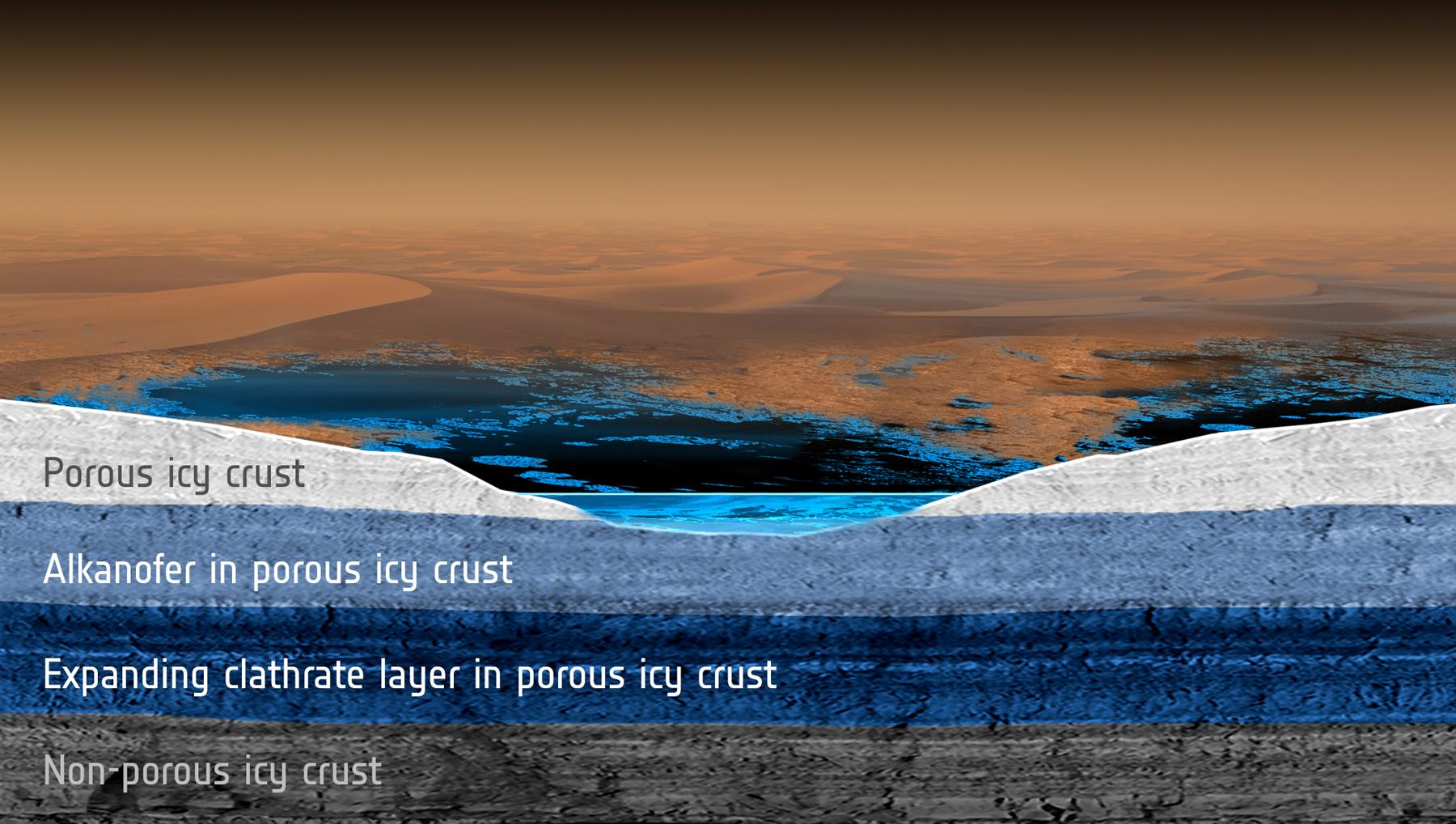
Structure of Titan's icy crust

Titan's surface is marked by broad regions of bright and dark terrain. These include Xanadu, a large, reflective equatorial area about the size of Australia. It was first identified in infrared images from the Hubble Space Telescope in 1994, and later viewed by the Cassini spacecraft. The convoluted region is filled with hills and cut by valleys and chasms. It is criss-crossed in places by dark lineaments—sinuous topographical features resembling ridges or crevices. These may represent tectonic activity, which would indicate that Xanadu is geologically young. Alternatively, the lineaments may be liquid-formed channels, suggesting old terrain that has been cut through by stream systems. There are dark areas of similar size elsewhere on Titan, observed from the ground and by Cassini; at least one of these, Ligeia Mare, Titan's second-largest sea, is almost a pure methane sea.

=== Lakes and seas ===
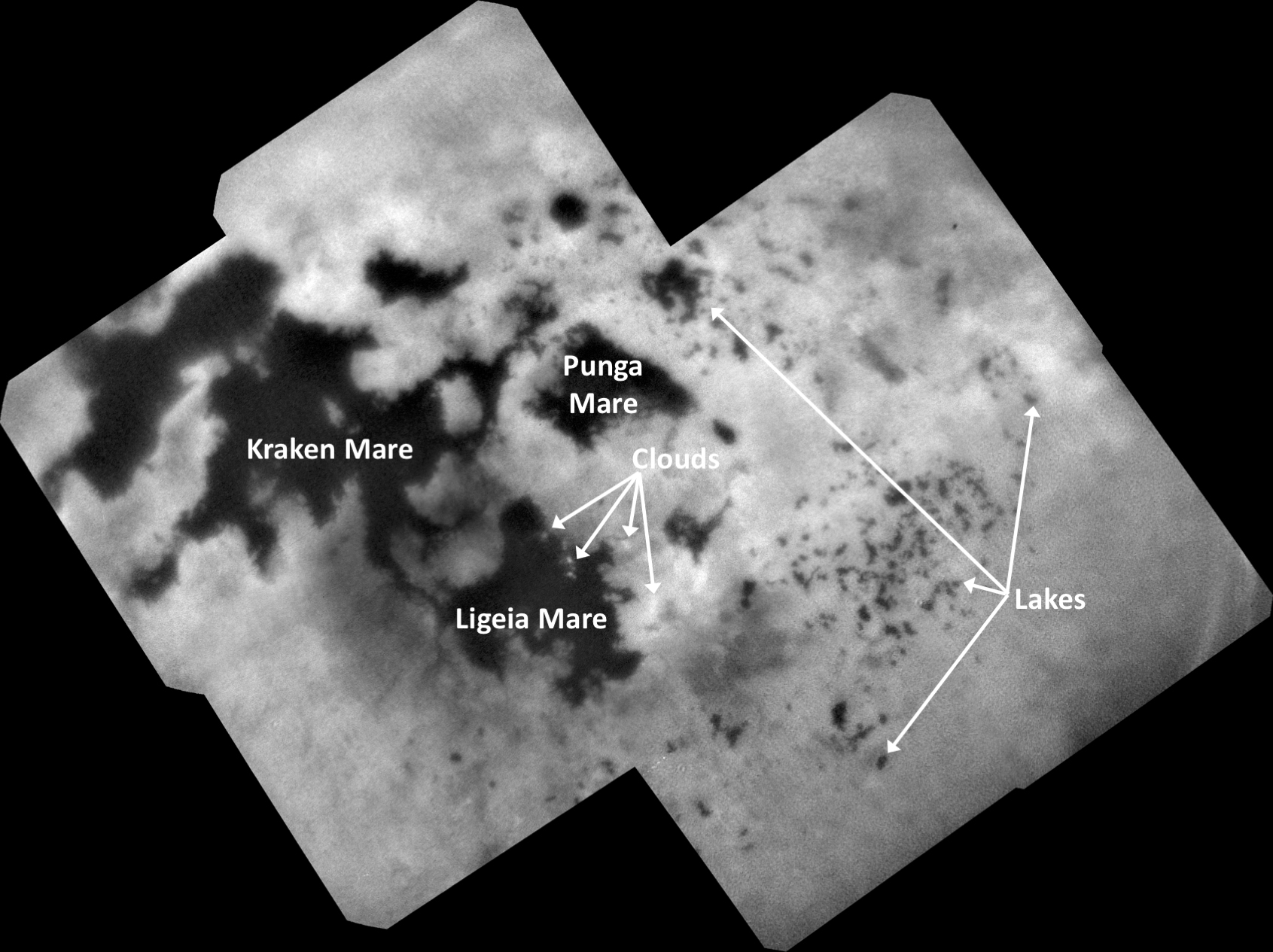
Titan's north polar region, featuring its three seas (maria)—Kraken Mare, Ligeia Mare, and Punga Mare—as well as smaller lakes (lacūs)

Following the Voyager flybys, Titan was confirmed to have an atmosphere capable of supporting liquid hydrocarbons on its surface. However, the first tentative detection only came in 1995, when data from the Hubble Space Telescope and radar observations suggested expansive hydrocarbon lakes, seas, or oceans. The existence of liquid hydrocarbons on Titan was finally confirmed in situ by the Cassini orbiter, with the Cassini mission team announcing "definitive evidence of the presence of lakes filled with liquid methane on Saturn's moon Titan" in January 2007.

The observed lakes and seas of Titan are largely restricted to its polar regions, where colder temperatures allow the presence of permanent liquid hydrocarbons. Near Titan's north pole are Kraken Mare, the largest sea; Ligeia Mare, the second-largest sea; and Punga Mare, each filling broad depressions and cumulatively representing roughly 80% of Titan's sea and lake coverage—691,000 km^{2} (267,000 sq mi) combined. All three maria's sea levels are similar, suggesting that they may be hydraulically connected. The southern polar region, meanwhile, hosts four dry broad depressions, potentially representing dried-up seabeds. Additional smaller lakes occupy Titan's polar regions, covering a cumulative surface area of 215,000 km^{2} (83,000 sq mi). Lakes in Titan's lower-latitude and equatorial regions have been proposed, though none have been confirmed; seasonal or transient equatorial lakes may pool following large rainstorms. Cassini RADAR data has been used to conduct bathymetry of Titan's seas and lakes. Using detected subsurface reflections, the measured maximum depth of Ligeia Mare is roughly 200 meters (660 ft), and that of Ontario Lacus is roughly 90 meters (300 ft).

Titan's lakes and seas are dominated by methane (CH_{4}), with smaller amounts of ethane (C_{2}H_{6}) and dissolved nitrogen (N_{2}). The fraction of these components varies across different bodies: observations of Ligeia Mare are consistent with 71% CH_{4}, 12% C_{2}H_{6}, and 17% N_{2} by volume; whilst Ontario Lacus is consistent with 49% CH_{4}, 41% C_{2}H_{6}, and 10% N_{2} by volume. As Titan is synchronously locked with Saturn, there exists a permanent tidal bulge of roughly 100 meters (330 ft) at the sub- and anti-Saturnian points. Titan's orbital eccentricity means that tidal acceleration varies by 9%, though the long orbital period means that these tidal cycles are very gradual. A team of researchers led by Ralph D. Lorenz evaluated that the tidal range of Titan's major seas is around 0.2–0.8 metres (0.66–2.62 ft).

In July 2025, NASA researchers published a study identifying cell-like compartments called vesicles, needed to form the precursors of living cells, and proposing that they could form in the lakes of Titan. Astrobiologists theorize that liquid hydrocarbons could allow molecules needed for life to form. Understanding such a process could shed light on the mystery of how life emerged on Earth.

=== Tectonics and cryovolcanism ===
Through Cassini RADAR mapping of Titan's surface, numerous landforms have been interpreted as candidate cryovolcanic and tectonic features by multiple authors. A 2016 analysis of mountainous ridges on Titan revealed that ridges are concentrated in Titan's equatorial regions. The ridges—primarily oriented east to west—are linear to arcuate in shape, with the authors of the analysis comparing them to terrestrial fold belts indicative of horizontal compression or convergence. They note that the global distribution of Titan's ridges could be indicative of global contraction, with a thickened ice shell causing regional uplift.

The identification of cryovolcanic features on Titan remains controversial and inconclusive, primarily due to limitations of Cassini imagery and coverage. Cassini RADAR and VIMS imagery revealed several candidate cryovolcanic features, particularly flow-like terrains in western Xanadu and steep-sided lakes in the northern hemisphere that resemble maar craters on Earth, which are created by explosive subterranean eruptions. The most probable feature of cryovolcanism is a complex of landforms that includes two mountains, Doom Mons and Erebor Mons; a large depression, Sotra Patera; and a system of flow-like features, Mohini Fluctus. Between 2005 and 2006, parts of Sotra Patera and Mohini Fluctus became significantly brighter whilst the surrounding plains remained unchanged, a potential indicator of ongoing cryovolcanic activity. One indirect line of evidence for cryovolcanism is the presence of Argon-40 in Titan's atmosphere. Radiogenic ^{40}Ar is sourced from the decay of ^{40}K, and has likely been produced within Titan over the course of billions of years within its rocky core. ^{40}Ar's presence in Titan's atmosphere is thus supportive of active geology on Titan, with cryovolcanism being one possible method of bringing the isotope up from the interior.

=== Impact craters ===
Titan's surface has comparatively few impact craters, with erosion, tectonics, and cryovolcanism possibly working to erase them over time. Compared to the craters of similarly sized and structured Ganymede and Callisto, those of Titan are much shallower. Many have dark floors of sediment; geomorphological analysis of impact craters largely suggests that erosion and burial are the primary mechanisms of crater modification. Titan's craters are also not evenly distributed, as the polar regions are almost devoid of any identified craters whilst the majority are located in the equatorial dune fields. This inequality may be the result of oceans that once occupied Titan's poles, polar sediment deposition by past rainfall, or increased rates of erosion in the polar regions.

=== Plains and dunes ===
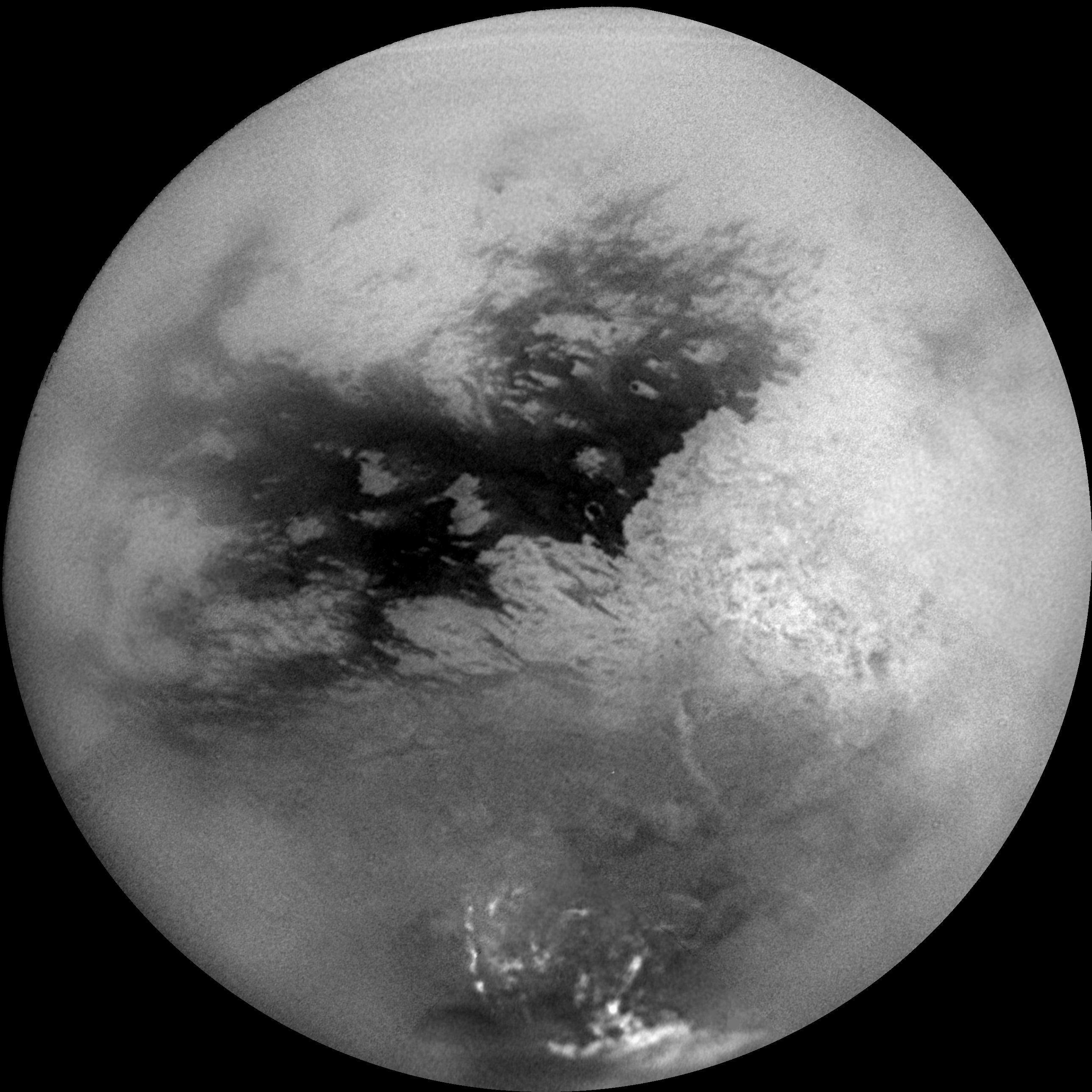
Cassini mosaic of Titan's equatorial dark regions, including the vast dune fields

The majority of Titan's surface is covered by plains. Of the several types of plains observed, the most extensive are the Undifferentiated Plains that encompass vast, radar-dark uniform regions. These mid-latitude plains—located largely between 20 and 60° north or south—appear younger than all major geological features except dunes and several craters. The Undifferentiated Plains likely were formed by wind-driven processes and composed of organic-rich sediment.

Another extensive type of terrain on Titan are sand dunes, grouped together into vast dune fields or "sand seas" located within 30° north or south. Titanian dunes are typically 1–2 km (0.62–1.24 mi) wide and spaced 1–4 km (0.62–2.49 mi) apart, with some individual dunes over 100 km (62 mi) in length. Limited radar-derived height data suggests that the dunes are 80–130 meters (260–430 ft) tall, with the dunes appearing dark in Cassini SAR imagery. Interactions between the dunes and obstacle features, such as mountains, indicate that sand is generally transported in a west-to-east direction. The sand that constructs the dunes is dominated by organic material, probably from Titan's atmosphere; possible sources of sand include river channels or the Undifferentiated Plains.

== Observation and exploration ==
Titan is never visible to the naked eye, but can be observed through small telescopes or strong binoculars. Amateur observation is difficult because of the proximity of Titan to Saturn's brilliant globe and ring system; an occulting bar, covering part of the eyepiece and used to block the bright planet, greatly improves viewing. Titan has a maximum apparent magnitude of +8.2, and mean opposition magnitude 8.4. This compares to +4.6 for the similarly sized Ganymede, in the Jovian system.

Observations of Titan prior to the space age were limited. In 1907 astronomer Josep Comas i Solà observed limb darkening of Titan, the first evidence that the body has an atmosphere. In 1944 Gerard P. Kuiper used a spectroscopic technique to detect an atmosphere of methane.

=== Pioneer and Voyager ===
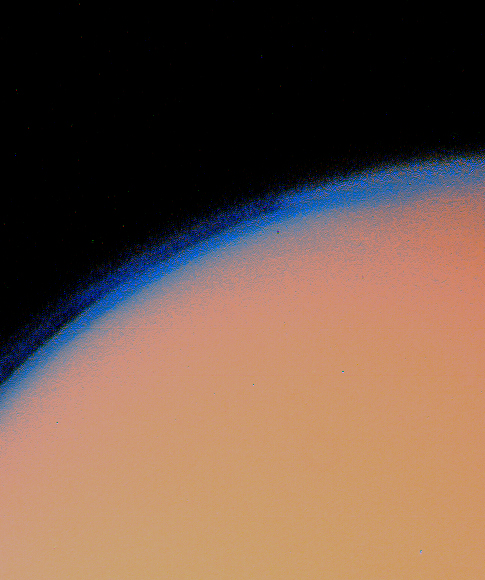
Voyager 1 view of haze on Titan's limb (1980)

The first probe to visit the Saturnian system was Pioneer 11 in 1979, which revealed that Titan was probably too cold to support life. It took images of Titan, including Titan and Saturn together in mid to late 1979. The quality was soon surpassed by the two Voyagers.

Titan was examined by both Voyager 1 and 2 in 1980 and 1981, respectively. Voyager 1's trajectory was designed to provide an optimized Titan flyby, during which the spacecraft was able to determine the density, composition, and temperature of the atmosphere, and obtain a precise measurement of Titan's mass. Atmospheric haze prevented direct imaging of the surface, though in 2004 intensive digital processing of images taken through Voyager 1's orange filter did reveal hints of the light and dark features now known as Xanadu and Shangri-la, which had been observed in the infrared by the Hubble Space Telescope. Voyager 2, which would have been diverted to perform the Titan flyby if Voyager 1 had been unable to, did not pass near Titan and continued on to Uranus and Neptune.

=== Cassini–Huygens ===
The Cassini–Huygens spacecraft reached Saturn on July 1, 2004, and began the process of mapping Titan's surface by radar. A joint project of the European Space Agency (ESA) and NASA, Cassini–Huygens proved a very successful mission. The Cassini probe flew by Titan on October 26, 2004, and took the highest-resolution images ever of Titan's surface, at only 1,200 km (750 mi), discerning patches of light and dark that would be invisible to the human eye.

On July 22, 2006, Cassini made its first targeted, close fly-by at 950 km (590 mi) from Titan; the closest flyby was at 880 km (550 mi) on June 21, 2010. Liquid has been found in abundance on the surface in the north polar region, in the form of many lakes and seas discovered by Cassini.

==== Huygens landing ====
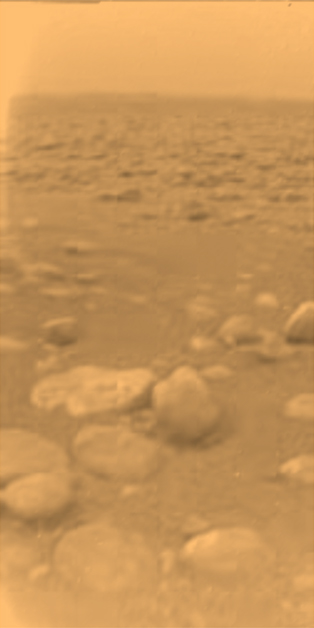
Huygens in situ image from Titan's surface—the only image from the surface of a body permanently farther away than Mars

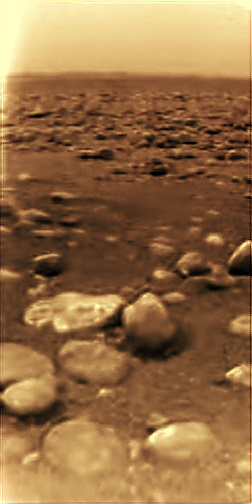
Same image with contrast enhanced

Huygens was an atmospheric probe that touched down on Titan on January 14, 2005, discovering that many of its surface features seem to have been formed by fluids at some point in the past. Titan is the most distant body from Earth to have a space probe land on its surface.

The Huygens probe descends by parachute and lands on Titan on January 14, 2005.

The Huygens probe landed just off the easternmost tip of a bright region now called Adiri. The probe photographed pale hills with dark "rivers" running down to a dark plain. Current understanding is that the hills (also referred to as highlands) are composed mainly of water ice. Dark organic compounds, created in the upper atmosphere by the ultraviolet radiation of the Sun, may rain from Titan's atmosphere. They are washed down the hills with the methane rain and are deposited on the plains over geological time scales.

After landing, Huygens photographed a dark plain covered in small rocks and pebbles, which are composed of water ice. The two rocks just below the middle of the image on the right are smaller than they may appear: the left-hand one is 15 centimeters across, and the one in the center is 4 centimeters across, at a distance of about 85 centimeters from Huygens. There is evidence of erosion at the base of the rocks, indicating possible fluvial activity. The ground surface is darker than originally expected, consisting of a mixture of water and hydrocarbon ice.

In March 2007, NASA, ESA, and COSPAR decided to name the Huygens landing site the Hubert Curien Memorial Station in memory of the former president of the ESA.

=== Dragonfly ===
The Dragonfly mission, developed and operated by the Johns Hopkins Applied Physics Laboratory, is scheduled to launch in July 2028. It consists of a large drone powered by an RTG to fly in the atmosphere of Titan as New Frontiers 4. Its instruments will study how far prebiotic chemistry may have progressed. The mission is planned to arrive at Titan in the mid-2030s.

=== Proposed or conceptual missions ===
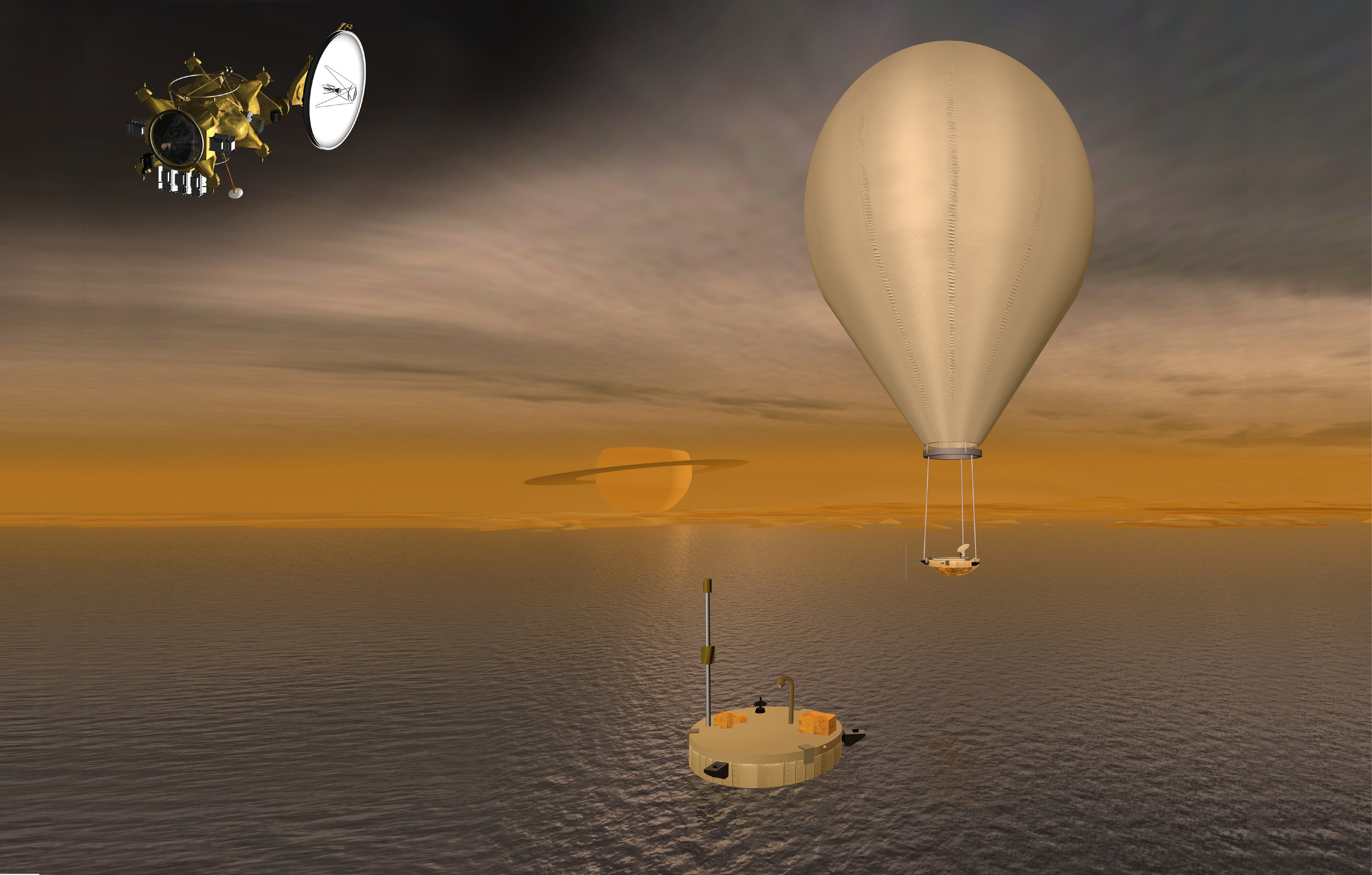
The lake lander, balloon and their orbiter proposed for the Titan Saturn System Mission (artistic rendition)

There have been several conceptual missions proposed in recent years for returning a robotic space probe to Titan. Initial conceptual work has been completed for such missions by NASA (and JPL), and ESA. At present, none of these proposals have become funded missions. The Titan Saturn System Mission (TSSM) was a joint NASA/ESA proposal for exploration of Saturn's moons. It envisions a hot-air balloon floating in Titan's atmosphere for six months. It was competing against the Europa Jupiter System Mission (EJSM) proposal for funding. In February 2009 it was announced that ESA/NASA had given the EJSM mission priority ahead of the TSSM. The proposed Titan Mare Explorer (TiME) was a low-cost lander that would splash down in Ligeia Mare in Titan's northern hemisphere. The probe would float whilst investigating Titan's hydrocarbon cycle, sea chemistry, and Titan's origins. It was selected for a Phase-A design study in 2011 as a candidate mission for the 12th NASA Discovery Program opportunity, but was not selected for flight.

Another mission to Titan proposed in early 2012 by Jason Barnes, a scientist at the University of Idaho, is the Aerial Vehicle for In-situ and Airborne Titan Reconnaissance (AVIATR): an uncrewed plane (or drone) that would fly through Titan's atmosphere and take high-definition images of the surface of Titan. NASA did not approve the requested $715 million, and the future of the project is uncertain.

A conceptual design for another lake lander was proposed in late 2012 by the Spanish-based private engineering firm SENER and the Centro de Astrobiología in Madrid. The concept probe is called Titan Lake In-situ Sampling Propelled Explorer (TALISE). The major difference compared to the TiME probe would be that TALISE is envisioned with its own propulsion system and would therefore not be limited to simply drifting on the lake when it splashes down.

A Discovery Program contestant for its mission #13 is Journey to Enceladus and Titan (JET), an astrobiology Saturn orbiter that would assess the habitability potential of Enceladus and Titan.

In 2015, the NASA Innovative Advanced Concepts program (NIAC) awarded a Phase II grant to a design study of a Titan Submarine to explore the seas of Titan.

== Prebiotic conditions and life ==
Profile of Titan's atmosphere compared to Earth's

Titan is thought to be a prebiotic environment rich in complex organic compounds, but its surface is in a deep freeze at −179 °C (−290.2 °F; 94.1 K) so it is currently understood that life cannot exist on the moon's frigid surface. However, Titan seems to contain a global ocean beneath its ice shell, and within this ocean, conditions are potentially suitable for microbial life.

The Cassini–Huygens mission was not equipped to provide evidence for biosignatures or complex organic compounds; it showed an environment on Titan that is similar, in some ways, to ones hypothesized for the primordial Earth. Scientists surmise that the atmosphere of early Earth was similar in composition to the current atmosphere on Titan, with the important exception of a lack of water vapor on Titan.

=== Formation of complex molecules ===
The Miller–Urey experiment and several following experiments have shown that with an atmosphere similar to that of Titan and the addition of UV radiation, complex molecules and polymer substances like tholins can be generated. The reaction starts with dissociation of nitrogen and methane, forming hydrogen cyanide and acetylene. Further reactions have been studied extensively.

It has been reported that when energy was applied to a combination of gases like those in Titan's atmosphere, five nucleotide bases, the building blocks of DNA and RNA, were among the many compounds produced. In addition, amino acids—the building blocks of protein—were found. It was the first time nucleotide bases and amino acids had been found in such an experiment without liquid water being present.

=== Possible subsurface habitats ===
Laboratory simulations have led to the suggestion that enough organic material exists on Titan to start a chemical evolution analogous to what is thought to have started life on Earth. The analogy assumes the presence of liquid water for longer periods than is currently observable; several hypotheses postulate that liquid water from an impact could be preserved under a frozen isolation layer. It has also been hypothesized that liquid-ammonia oceans could exist deep below the surface. Another model suggests an ammonia–water solution as much as 200 km (120 miles) deep beneath a water-ice crust with conditions that, although extreme by terrestrial standards, are such that life could survive. Heat transfer between the interior and upper layers would be critical in sustaining any subsurface oceanic life. Detection of microbial life on Titan would depend on its biogenic effects, with the atmospheric methane and nitrogen examined.

=== Methane and life at the surface ===
It has been speculated that life could exist in the lakes of liquid methane on Titan, just as organisms on Earth live in water. Such organisms would inhale H_{2} in place of O_{2}, metabolize it with acetylene instead of glucose, and exhale methane instead of carbon dioxide. However, such hypothetical organisms would be required to metabolize at a deep freeze temperature of −179.2 °C (−290.6 °F; 94.0 K).

All life forms on Earth (including methanogens) use liquid water as a solvent; it is speculated that life on Titan might instead use a liquid hydrocarbon, such as methane or ethane, although water is a stronger solvent than methane. Water is also more chemically reactive, and can break down large organic molecules through hydrolysis. A life form whose solvent was a hydrocarbon would not face the risk of its biomolecules being destroyed in this way.

In 2005, astrobiologist Chris McKay argued that if methanogenic life did exist on the surface of Titan, it would likely have a measurable effect on the mixing ratio in the Titan troposphere: levels of hydrogen and acetylene would be measurably lower than otherwise expected. Assuming metabolic rates similar to those of methanogenic organisms on Earth, the concentration of molecular hydrogen would drop by a factor of 1,000 on the Titanian surface solely due to a hypothetical biological sink. McKay noted that, if life is indeed present, the low temperatures on Titan would result in very slow metabolic processes, which could conceivably be hastened by the use of catalysts similar to enzymes. He also noted that the low solubility of organic compounds in methane presents a more significant challenge to any possible form of life. Forms of active transport, and organisms with large surface-to-volume ratios could theoretically lessen the disadvantages posed by this fact.

In 2010, Darrell Strobel, from Johns Hopkins University, identified a greater abundance of molecular hydrogen in the upper atmospheric layers of Titan compared to the lower layers, arguing for a downward flow at a rate of roughly 10^{28} molecules per second and disappearance of hydrogen near Titan's surface; as Strobel noted, his findings were in line with the effects McKay had predicted if methanogenic life-forms were present. The same year, another study showed low levels of acetylene on Titan's surface, which were interpreted by McKay as consistent with the hypothesis of organisms consuming hydrocarbons. Although restating the biological hypothesis, he cautioned that other explanations for the hydrogen and acetylene findings are more likely: the possibilities of yet unidentified physical or chemical processes (e.g. a surface catalyst accepting hydrocarbons or hydrogen), or flaws in the current models of material flow. Composition data and transport models need to be substantiated, etc. Even so, despite saying that a non-biological catalytic explanation would be less startling than a biological one, McKay noted that the discovery of a catalyst effective at 95 K (−180 °C) would still be significant. With regard to the acetylene findings, Mark Allen, the principal investigator with the NASA Astrobiology Institute Titan team, provided a speculative, non-biological explanation: sunlight or cosmic rays could transform the acetylene in icy aerosols in the atmosphere into more complex molecules that would fall to the ground with no acetylene signature.

As NASA notes in its news article on the June 2010 findings: "To date, methane-based life forms are only hypothetical. Scientists have not yet detected this form of life anywhere." As the NASA statement also says: "some scientists believe these chemical signatures bolster the argument for a primitive, exotic form of life or precursor to life on Titan's surface."

In February 2015, a hypothetical cell membrane capable of functioning in liquid methane at cryogenic temperatures (deep freeze) conditions was modeled. Composed of small molecules containing carbon, hydrogen, and nitrogen, it would have the same stability and flexibility as cell membranes on Earth, which are composed of phospholipids, compounds of carbon, hydrogen, oxygen, and phosphorus. This hypothetical cell membrane was termed an "azotosome", a combination of "azote", French for nitrogen, and "liposome". Barriers to azotosome formation may be present, based on thermodynamic calculations, however a newer proposed formation mechanism may have overcome these objections.

=== Obstacles ===
Despite these biological possibilities, there are formidable obstacles to life on Titan, and any analogy to Earth is inexact. At a vast distance from the Sun, Titan is frigid, and its atmosphere lacks CO_{2}. At Titan's surface, water exists only in solid form. Because of these difficulties, scientists such as Jonathan Lunine have viewed Titan less as a likely habitat for life than as an experiment for examining hypotheses on the conditions that prevailed prior to the appearance of life on Earth. Although life itself may not exist, the prebiotic conditions on Titan and the associated organic chemistry remain of great interest in understanding the early history of the terrestrial biosphere. Using Titan as a prebiotic experiment involves not only observation through spacecraft, but laboratory experiments, and chemical and photochemical modeling on Earth.

=== Panspermia hypothesis ===
It is hypothesized that large asteroid and cometary impacts on Earth's surface may have caused fragments of microbe-laden rock to escape Earth's gravity, suggesting the possibility of panspermia. Calculations indicate that these would encounter many of the bodies in the Solar System, including Titan. On the other hand, Jonathan Lunine has argued that any living things in Titan's cryogenic hydrocarbon lakes would need to be so different chemically from Earth life that it would not be possible for one to be the ancestor of the other.

=== Future conditions ===
Conditions on Titan could become far more habitable in the far future. Five billion years from now, as the Sun becomes a sub-red giant, its surface temperature could rise enough for Titan to support liquid water on its surface, making it habitable. As the Sun's ultraviolet output decreases, the haze in Titan's upper atmosphere will be depleted, lessening the anti-greenhouse effect on the surface and enabling the greenhouse created by atmospheric methane to play a far greater role. These conditions together could create a habitable environment, and could persist for several hundred million years. This is proposed to have been sufficient time for simple life to spawn on Earth, though the higher viscosity of ammonia-water solutions coupled with low temperatures would cause chemical reactions to proceed more slowly on Titan.

== See also ==
- Colonization of Titan
- Lakes of Titan
- Atmosphere of Titan
- Life on Titan
- List of natural satellites
- Saturn's moons in fiction
- The sky of Titan
- Titan in fiction
- Titan-like exoplanet
- Titan Winged Aerobot
- Vid Flumina a river of methane and ethane on Titan
