= Climate of Titan =

Graph showing temperature, pressure, and other aspects of Titan's climate, including atmospheric haze, the methane greenhouse effect, and the methane cycle

The climate of Titan, the largest moon of Saturn, is characterized by a thick atmosphere, a methane cycle, seasonal changes, and extremely low temperatures. Titan receives only about 1% as much sunlight as Earth and has an average surface temperature of about 94 K (−179.2 °C; −290.5 °F). Despite its cold surface, atmospheric methane produces a substantial greenhouse effect, while atmospheric haze produces an opposing anti-greenhouse effect.

Titan's climate has several similarities to Earth's, including clouds, rainfall, lakes, atmospheric circulation, and seasonal changes, although methane and other hydrocarbons play roles analogous to those of water in many of its meteorological processes. Saturn's 29.5-year orbit around the Sun drives Titan's seasons, which influence its atmospheric circulation, cloud formation, rainfall, winds, and the distribution of surface lakes and seas. Titan's atmosphere also exhibits pole-to-pole circulation, with methane and ethane clouds occurring at different altitudes and latitudes.

Titan's climate has been studied using observations from Earth and spacecraft, particularly the Cassini–Huygens mission, which provided detailed measurements of its atmosphere and surface. More recent observations by the James Webb Space Telescope and other observatories have continued to reveal seasonal cloud activity and other aspects of Titan's climate.

== Temperature ==
Energy flow of Titan showing the greenhouse effect and anti-greenhouse effect

Titan receives only about 1% as much sunlight as Earth. Titan's average surface temperature is about 94 K (−179.2 °C; −290.5 °F). At this temperature, water ice has extremely low vapor pressure, leaving the atmosphere nearly devoid of water vapor. However, methane in the atmosphere produces a substantial greenhouse effect, keeping Titan's surface significantly warmer than its equilibrium temperature would otherwise be.

Haze in Titan's atmosphere contributes to an anti-greenhouse effect by reflecting sunlight back into space, making the surface significantly colder than the upper atmosphere. This partially offsets the greenhouse effect and lowers Titan's surface temperature by about 9 K, while the greenhouse effect raises it by about 21 K. Together, these effects produce a surface temperature about 12 K warmer than the effective temperature of 82 K (−191.2 °C; −312.1 °F) that Titan would have in the absence of an atmosphere.

== Seasons ==
Titan's orbital inclination relative to the Sun is closely aligned with Saturn's axial tilt, at about 27 degrees, while its axial tilt relative to its orbit is approximately zero. Consequently, the direction of incoming sunlight is determined primarily by Titan's day-night cycle and Saturn's orbital cycle. A day on Titan lasts about 15 days and 22 hours, equal to the time it takes Titan to orbit Saturn. Because Titan is tidally locked to Saturn, the same hemisphere always faces the planet, so Titan has no separate monthly cycle.

Seasonal changes on Titan are driven by Saturn's orbit around the Sun, which takes about 29.5 Earth years. As Saturn moves through its orbit, Titan's northern and southern hemispheres receive different amounts of sunlight. Seasonal changes include larger hydrocarbon lakes in the northern hemisphere during winter and reduced haze around the equinoxes due to changes in atmospheric circulation. Associated ice clouds have also been observed near the south pole.

Surface winds on Titan are normally weak, with speeds below 1 m/s (3.3 ft/s). Computer simulations suggest that the large equatorial dunes, composed of soot-like material deposited from the atmosphere, may instead be shaped by rare storms that occur around the equinoxes, roughly once every 15 years. These storms produce strong downdrafts that flow eastward at up to 10 m/s (33 ft/s) near the surface. In late 2010, corresponding to early spring in Titan's northern hemisphere, a series of methane storms was observed in Titan's equatorial desert regions.

Because Saturn's orbit is eccentric, Titan is about 12% closer to the Sun during southern summer. As a result, southern summers are shorter but warmer than northern summers. This seasonal asymmetry may contribute to differences between Titan's hemispheres, including the greater number of hydrocarbon lakes in the northern hemisphere. Titan's lakes are generally calm, with few waves or ripples. However, Cassini observations found evidence of increased turbulence during the northern summer, suggesting that surface winds may strengthen at certain times of the Titan year. Cassini has also observed waves and ripples on the lakes.

== Methane rain and lakes ==
Observations by the Huygens probe indicate that Titan's atmosphere periodically produces rainfall of liquid methane and other organic compounds onto the surface. In October 2007, observers detected an increase in cloud opacity over the equatorial Xanadu region, which was interpreted as possible evidence of "methane drizzle", although it was not direct evidence of rainfall. Subsequent images of lakes in Titan's southern hemisphere taken over more than a year showed that they had expanded and filled through seasonal hydrocarbon rainfall. Titan is one of the few places in the Solar System where rainbows could theoretically form, although most would be visible only at infrared wavelengths because Titan's atmosphere is relatively clear at those wavelengths.

On Titan, weak sunlight limits evaporation to about 1 cm per year, compared with about 1 m of water on Earth. However, Titan's atmosphere can hold the equivalent of about 10 m (33 ft) of liquid before precipitation occurs, compared with only a few centimeters on Earth. The combination of low evaporation and high atmospheric moisture capacity is expected to produce intense rainfall and flash floods separated by periods of drought lasting decades or centuries.

Fewer methane lakes are visible near Titan's south pole than near its north pole. One hypothesis is that methane accumulates in the polar regions through rainfall during winter and evaporates during summer, contributing to the greater abundance of lakes in the northern hemisphere. According to a model by Tetsuya Tokano of the University of Cologne, evaporation from the large northern seas, including Kraken Mare, Ligeia Mare, and Punga Mare, could produce cyclones accompanied by rainfall and winds of up to 20 m/s (66 ft/s) during northern summer. These storms could last for up to 10 days. Typical surface winds in Titan's northern hemisphere during summer are much weaker, at about 1 m/s (3.3 ft/s) or less, although even modest winds may be sufficient to generate small waves on the lakes. Cassini's radar and Visual and Infrared Mapping Spectrometer detected waves on several occasions in 2014. The waves may have been generated by seasonal winds or tidal currents.

== Winds and circulation ==
Atmospheric vortex over Titan's south pole

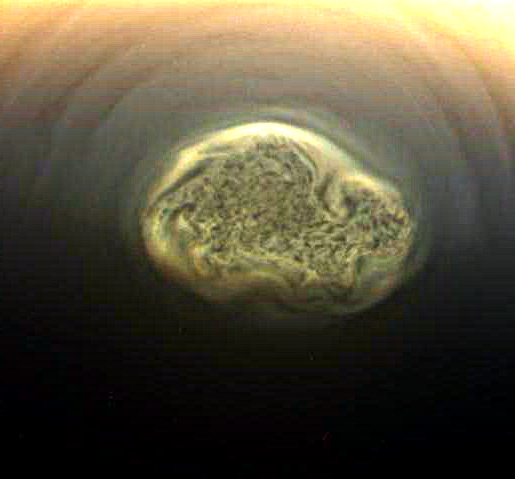
Haze vortex over Titan's south pole

Simulations of Titan's global wind patterns, based on wind-speed measurements taken by the Huygens probe during its descent, suggest that the atmosphere circulates in a single, large Hadley cell, in which warm air rises, flows toward the poles at high altitudes, and returns toward the equator near the surface. During Huygens' descent, Titan's southern hemisphere was experiencing summer. Warm air rose there and flowed northward at high altitudes, while cooler air sank in the northern hemisphere and flowed southward near the surface. Titan's slow rotation allows this circulation to extend from pole to pole. The circulation is centered in the stratosphere and is modeled to reverse approximately every 12 years, with a three-year transition period, during Titan's 29.5-year orbital cycle around the Sun.

This circulation creates a global band of low pressure analogous to Earth's Intertropical Convergence Zone (ITCZ). Unlike Earth's ITCZ, which is largely confined to the tropics by the distribution of oceans and continents, Titan's zone migrates between the poles, carrying methane rainclouds with it. This gives Titan a form of tropical atmospheric circulation despite its extremely low temperatures.

The Winds of Titan
Recording of Titan's winds by the Huygens probe

In June 2012, Cassini imaged a rotating polar vortex over Titan's south pole. The imaging team associated the vortex with a "polar hood", a region of dense, high-altitude haze that had previously been observed over the north pole. Following the 2009 equinox, Titan's southern hemisphere entered winter while the northern hemisphere entered summer, and researchers interpreted the southern vortex as evidence of the seasonal development of a southern polar hood.

== Clouds ==
Titan's clouds, probably composed of methane, ethane, or other simple organic compounds, are scattered and variable, appearing against the moon's pervasive atmospheric haze.

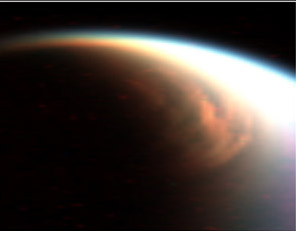
False-color image of a cloud system over Titan's north pole

In September 2006, Cassini imaged a large cloud about 40 km (25 mi) above Titan's north pole. Although methane is known to condense in Titan's atmosphere, the cloud was more likely composed of ethane because its particles were only 1–3 micrometers (μm) in diameter and ethane can freeze at these altitudes. In December, Cassini observed the cloud again and detected methane, ethane, and other organic compounds. The cloud was more than 2,400 km (1,500 mi) in diameter and remained visible during a subsequent flyby a month later. One hypothesis is that the region was experiencing rain or, at sufficiently low temperatures, snow. Strong downdrafts at high northern latitudes could transport organic particles toward the surface. These observations provided strong evidence for the hypothesized methane cycle on Titan, analogous to Earth's water cycle.

Clouds have also been observed over Titan's south polar region. Although they typically cover about 1% of Titan's disk, outburst events have been observed in which cloud cover rapidly expands to as much as 8%. One hypothesis is that increased sunlight during the southern summer causes atmospheric uplift and convection, leading to cloud formation. However, this hypothesis does not account for observations of cloud formation both after the summer solstice and during mid-spring. Increased methane humidity at the south pole may also contribute to rapid increases in cloud size. Models predicted that ethane would begin to condense over Titan's south pole as the seasons changed.

Animated sequence showing methane clouds on Titan in July 2014

Models that reproduce observations well suggest that Titan's clouds cluster at preferred locations and that cloud cover varies with altitude and latitude. In the polar regions above 60 degrees latitude, widespread and persistent ethane clouds occur in and above the troposphere. At lower latitudes, methane clouds are found mainly at altitudes of 15–18 km (9.3–11.2 mi) and are more sporadic and localized. In the summer hemisphere, methane clouds tend to cluster around 40 degrees latitude and are often thick but localized.

Ground-based observations also reveal seasonal variations in cloud cover. Over the course of Saturn's approximately 30-year orbit around the Sun, Titan's cloud systems appear to persist for about 25 years before fading for four to five years and then reappearing.

Cassini also detected high-altitude, white cirrus-type clouds in Titan's upper atmosphere, which are likely composed of methane.

In 2022 and 2023, observations by the James Webb Space Telescope and the W. M. Keck Observatory confirmed the presence of convective methane clouds in Titan's northern hemisphere during northern summer.

No evidence of lightning activity has been observed on Titan. However, computer models suggest that clouds in the lower troposphere can accumulate enough electrical charge to produce lightning at altitudes of about 20 km (12 mi). Lightning in Titan's atmosphere could promote the formation of organic compounds. Cassini detected no lightning during its mission, although lightning could still occur with radio emissions too weak for detection. Computer simulations suggest that, at low nitrogen concentrations or under strong electric fields, streamer discharges, which are an early stage of lightning formation, could occur on Titan.

== See also ==
- Colonization of Titan
- Dragonfly – Future NASA mission to Titan
- Geology of Titan
- Life on Titan
