= Atmosphere of Titan =

Gas layer surrounding the moon Titan

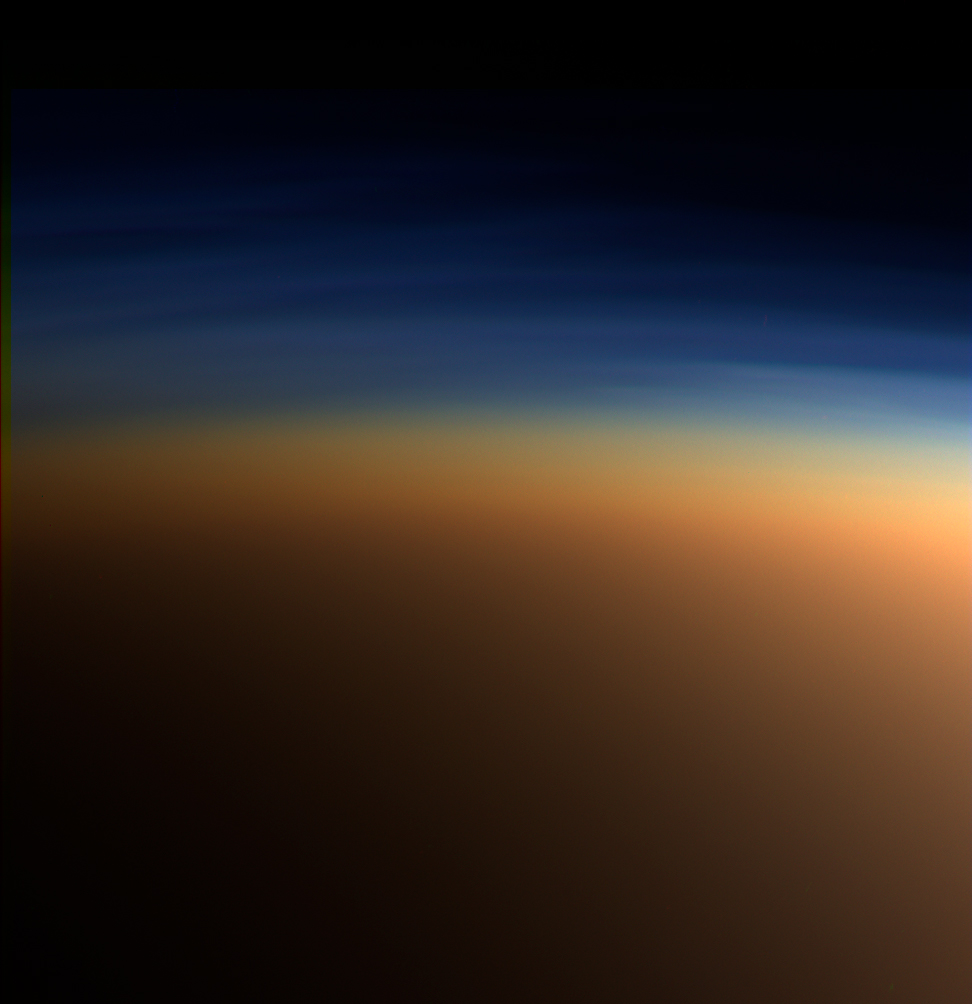
- True-color image of layers of haze in Titan's atmosphere

General information
- Average surface pressure: 1.5 bar (150 kPa)
- Scale height: 15–50 km (9.3–31.1 mi)
- Chemical species: Molar fraction

Composition
- Nitrogen: 94.2%
- Methane: 5.65%
- Hydrogen: 0.099%
- Argon: 0.0043%

The atmosphere of Titan is the layer of gases surrounding Titan, the largest moon of Saturn. Titan is the only natural satellite in the Solar System with an atmosphere denser than Earth's. Its thick, nitrogen-rich atmosphere contains methane and other gases and is shrouded in a distinctive orange haze of complex organic compounds known as tholins.

Titan's lower atmosphere consists primarily of nitrogen (94.2%), methane (5.65%), and hydrogen (0.099%). It also contains trace amounts of hydrocarbons and other gases, including ethane, acetylene, hydrogen cyanide, carbon dioxide, and argon. Titan's atmosphere has an estimated mass of 9.1×10^{18} kg, nearly twice that of Earth's atmosphere. The surface pressure is about 50% higher than Earth's, at 1.5 bar (150 kPa). This pressure exceeds the triple point of methane, allowing liquid methane to exist on the surface alongside methane vapor in the atmosphere.

Titan has a seasonal global atmospheric circulation that reverses roughly every half Titan year and drives a methane cycle involving clouds, rain, and hydrocarbon lakes. The thick haze gives the daytime sky a dark orange appearance and strongly influences the appearance of sunsets and Saturn as seen from the surface. Although Titan's atmosphere has lost substantial mass over geological time, it remains dense because Titan initially contained a large inventory of volatile compounds.

== Observation and exploration ==
Comparison of the atmospheres of Earth (left) and Titan (right)

Graph showing temperature, pressure, atmospheric haze, the methane greenhouse effect, and the methane cycle on Titan

The presence of a substantial atmosphere on Titan was first suspected by Spanish astronomer Josep Comas i Solà, who observed distinct limb darkening on Titan in 1903 from the Fabra Observatory in Barcelona. Dutch astronomer Gerard Kuiper confirmed the observation in 1944 using spectroscopy and estimated a methane partial pressure of about 100 mbar (10 kPa). Observations in the 1970s showed that Kuiper had substantially underestimated the amount of methane: it was about 10 times more abundant than he had estimated, while the surface pressure was at least twice as high. The high surface pressure indicated that methane could account for only a small fraction of Titan's atmosphere. In 1980, Voyager 1 made the first detailed observations of Titan's atmosphere and measured a surface pressure of about 1.5 bar (150 kPa), approximately 1.48 times that of Earth's.

The joint NASA–ESA Cassini–Huygens mission provided extensive observations of Titan and the Saturn system after entering orbit around Saturn on July 1, 2004. Isotopic measurements indicated that the nitrogen in Titan's atmosphere originated from material associated with the Oort cloud, such as comets, rather than from the material that formed Saturn. The mission also found evidence of complex organic compounds on Titan, including polycyclic aromatic hydrocarbons, propylene, and methane.

Titan's atmosphere is opaque at many wavelengths, making it difficult to obtain a complete reflectance spectrum of the surface from outside the atmosphere. The first direct images of Titan's surface were obtained after Cassini–Huygens arrived at Saturn in 2004. During its descent, the Huygens probe could not determine the Sun's direction, leading the team to compare taking surface images to "taking pictures of an asphalt parking lot at dusk".

NASA's Dragonfly mission is planned to land a rotorcraft on Titan in 2034. The mission will study Titan's habitability and prebiotic chemistry at multiple locations. It will also investigate geological processes and measure the composition of Titan's surface and atmosphere.

== Vertical structure ==
Cross-section of the layers of Titan's atmosphere, drawn to scale

Titan's vertical atmospheric structure is similar to Earth's, with a troposphere, stratosphere, mesosphere, and thermosphere. However, Titan's lower surface gravity produces a more extended atmosphere, with scale heights of 15–50 km (9.3–31.1 mi) compared with 5–8 km (3.1–5.0 mi) on Earth. Even at an altitude of 975 km (606 mi), the Cassini spacecraft had to account for atmospheric drag to maintain a stable trajectory. Data from Voyager and Huygens, together with radiative-convective models, have provided a detailed understanding of Titan's atmospheric structure.

The troposphere is the lowest atmospheric layer and contains most of Titan's weather. Methane condenses at high altitudes, causing its abundance to increase below the tropopause, which is at an altitude of about 32 km (20 mi). Methane reaches a nearly constant abundance of 4.9% between about 8 km (5.0 mi) and the surface. Methane rain, haze precipitation, and varying cloud layers occur in the troposphere.

The stratosphere consists of about 98.4% nitrogen, making Titan the only body in the Solar System besides Earth with a dense, nitrogen-rich atmosphere. The remaining 1.6% consists primarily of methane (1.4%) and hydrogen (0.1–0.2%). The main tholin haze layer lies in the stratosphere at an altitude of about 100–210 km (62–130 mi). The haze produces a strong temperature inversion because of its high ratio of shortwave to infrared opacity.

The mesosphere contains a detached haze layer at an altitude of about 450–500 km (280–310 mi). Temperatures at this altitude are similar to those in the thermosphere, partly because of cooling associated with hydrogen cyanide (HCN) emission lines.

In the thermosphere, particle production begins through processes that produce heavy ions and particles. Cassini's closest approach to Titan's atmosphere occurred in this region.

Titan's ionosphere is more complex than Earth's. Its main ionosphere lies at an altitude of about 1,200 km (750 mi), with an additional layer of charged particles at about 63 km (39 mi). This structure partially divides Titan's atmosphere into two radio-resonating regions. Cassini–Huygens detected extremely low-frequency (ELF) waves on Titan, but their source remains uncertain because no lightning activity has been detected. Major sources of Titan's ionosphere include solar irradiance, electrons and ions from Saturn's magnetosphere that travel along magnetic field lines ($H^+_2$, $H^+$, $O ^+$), and galactic cosmic rays.

== Temperature ==
Energy flow of Titan showing the greenhouse effect and anti-greenhouse effect

Titan receives approximately 1% of the solar radiation received by Earth. Its average surface temperature is about 94 K (−179.2 °C; −290.5 °F). At this temperature, water ice has very low vapor pressure, resulting in little water vapor in Titan's atmosphere. Methane nevertheless produces a significant greenhouse effect, raising the surface temperature above Titan's equilibrium temperature.

Titan's atmospheric haze also produces an anti-greenhouse effect by reflecting incoming sunlight back into space, reducing the solar energy reaching the surface and lowering its temperature. The anti-greenhouse effect lowers Titan's surface temperature by about 9 K, while the greenhouse effect raises it by about 21 K. Together, these effects produce a surface temperature about 12 K higher than Titan's estimated effective temperature of 82 K (−191.2 °C; −312.1 °F) in the absence of an atmosphere.

== Composition and chemistry ==
Titan's lower atmosphere is composed primarily of nitrogen (94.2%), methane (5.65%), and hydrogen (0.099%). It also contains trace amounts of hydrocarbons, including ethane, diacetylene, methylacetylene, acetylene, propane, and polycyclic aromatic hydrocarbons (PAHs), as well as other gases such as cyanoacetylene, hydrogen cyanide, carbon dioxide, carbon monoxide, cyanogen, acetonitrile, argon, and helium. Isotopic studies of nitrogen ratios also suggest that acetonitrile may be present in greater quantities than hydrogen cyanide and cyanoacetylene.

=== Photochemistry and tholins ===
Photochemical processes leading to the formation of tholins in Titan's upper atmosphere

Titan's atmospheric chemistry is driven largely by photochemistry. Ultraviolet radiation from the Sun breaks apart methane in the upper atmosphere, initiating reactions that produce hydrocarbons and a thick orange haze of complex organic compounds known as tholins. The table below summarizes the main production and loss mechanisms of the most abundant photochemically produced molecules.

Chemistry in Titan's atmosphere
Molecule	Production	Loss
Hydrogen	Methane photolysis	Escape
Carbon monoxide	$\ce{O + CH3->H2CO + H}$ $\ce{H2CO + h\nu->CO + H2/2H}$	$\ce{CO + OH->CO2 + H}$
Ethane	$\ce{2CH3 + M->C2H6 + M}$	Condensation
Acetylene	$\ce{C2H + CH4->C2H2 + CH3}$	$\ce{C2H2 + h\nu->C2H + H}$ Condensation
Propane	$\ce{CH3 + C2H5 + M->C3H8 + M}$	Condensation
Ethylene	$\ce{CH + CH4->C2H4 + H}$ $\ce{CH2 + CH3->C2H4 + H}$	$\ce{C2H4 + h\nu->C2H2 + H2/2H}$
Hydrogen cyanide	$\ce{N + CH3->H2CN + H}$ $\ce{H2CN + H->HCN + H2}$	Condensation
Carbon dioxide	$\ce{CO + OH->CO2 + H}$	Condensation
Methylacetylene	$\ce{CH + C2H4->CH3CCH + H}$	$\ce{CH3CCH + h\nu->C3H3 + H}$ $\ce{H + CH3CCH->C3H5}$
Diacetylene	$\ce{C2H + C2H2->C4H2 + H}$	$\ce{C4H2 + h\nu->C4H + H}$

=== Magnetic field ===
Titan's intrinsic magnetic field is negligible and may be nonexistent. However, studies in 2008 showed that Titan can retain remnants of Saturn's magnetic field during brief periods when it passes outside Saturn's magnetosphere and becomes directly exposed to the solar wind. This interaction can ionize molecules in Titan's upper atmosphere and carry some of them away. One such event occurred when a coronal mass ejection struck Saturn's magnetosphere, exposing Titan to shocked solar wind in the magnetosheath. This increased particle precipitation and produced unusually high electron densities in Titan's ionosphere.

Titan orbits Saturn at a distance of about 20.3 Saturn radii, placing it within Saturn's magnetosphere much of the time. However, Saturn's rotational period of 10.7 hours is much shorter than Titan's orbital period of 15.95 days. This difference produces a relative speed of about 100 km/s between Saturn's magnetized plasma and Titan. Rather than shielding Titan's atmosphere from the solar wind, this interaction may enhance chemical reactions that contribute to atmospheric loss.

=== Chemistry of the ionosphere ===
In November 2007, scientists found evidence of negative ions in Titan's ionosphere with masses up to about 13,800 times that of hydrogen. These ions are thought to descend into the lower atmosphere, where they contribute to the formation of the orange haze that obscures Titan's surface.

Smaller negative ions have been identified as linear carbon-chain anions, while larger ions show evidence of more complex structures, possibly derived from benzene. These ions may play an important role in the formation of complex organic molecules, including tholins, polycyclic aromatic hydrocarbons, cyanopolyynes, and their derivatives. Similar negative ions have been shown to promote the formation of larger organic molecules in molecular clouds outside the Solar System. This similarity suggests that Titan's negative ions may provide insight into organic chemistry in other astronomical environments.

== Circulation and dynamics ==
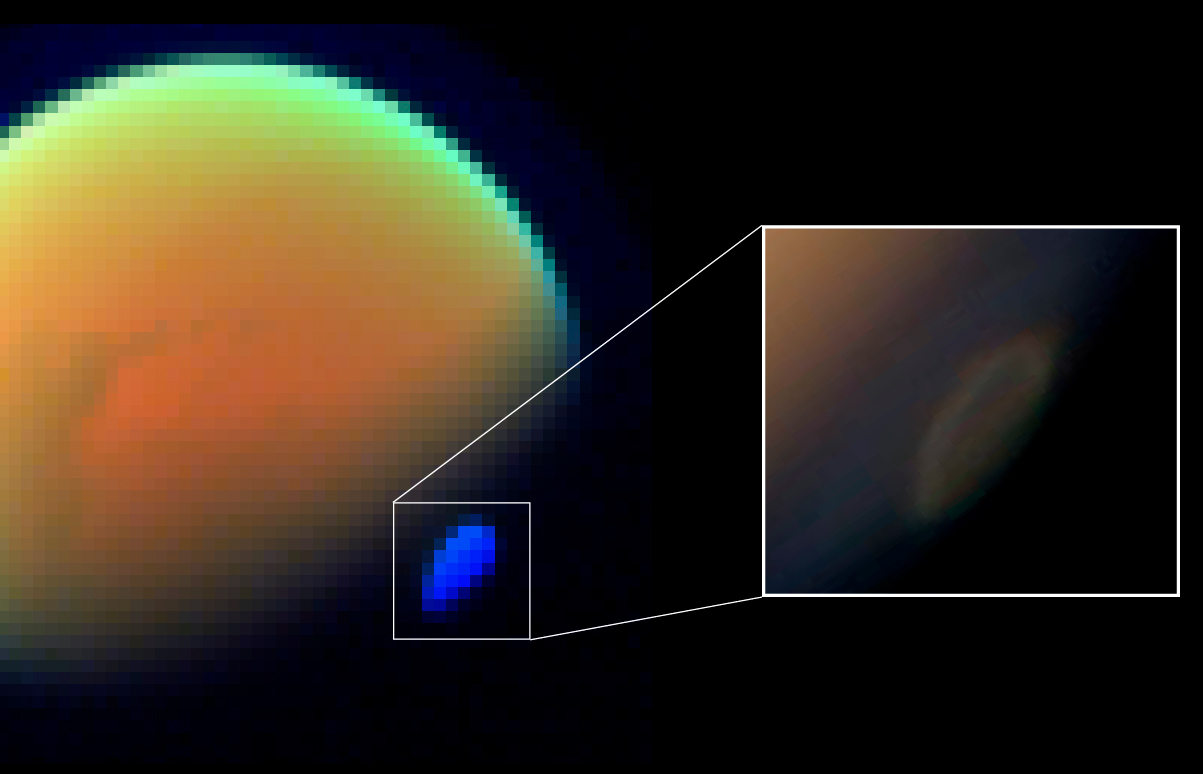
Polar vortex over Titan's south pole, imaged on November 29, 2012

Simulations of Titan's global atmospheric circulation, based on wind-speed measurements recorded by the Huygens probe during its descent, indicate the presence of a large Hadley cell. During the descent, Titan's southern hemisphere was experiencing summer. Warm air rose in the south and moved northward at high altitudes, while cooler air descended in the northern hemisphere and returned southward near the surface. Titan's slow rotation allows this circulation to extend from pole to pole. Models indicate that the circulation reverses approximately every 12 years, with a transition lasting about three years, over Titan's 29.5-year orbit around the Sun.

This circulation produces a global low-pressure zone comparable to Earth's Intertropical Convergence Zone (ITCZ). Unlike Earth's ITCZ, which is largely confined to tropical latitudes by the distribution of continents and oceans, Titan's low-pressure zone shifts between the poles with the seasons. Its migration is associated with the movement of methane-bearing clouds and rainfall.

In June 2012, the Cassini spacecraft observed a rotating polar vortex over Titan's south pole. The feature was associated with a region of dense, high-altitude haze known as a "polar hood". Following the 2009 equinox, Titan's southern hemisphere entered winter while its northern hemisphere entered summer. The development of the southern polar vortex was interpreted as evidence of the seasonal formation of a southern polar hood.

== Methane cycle ==
Clouds on Titan

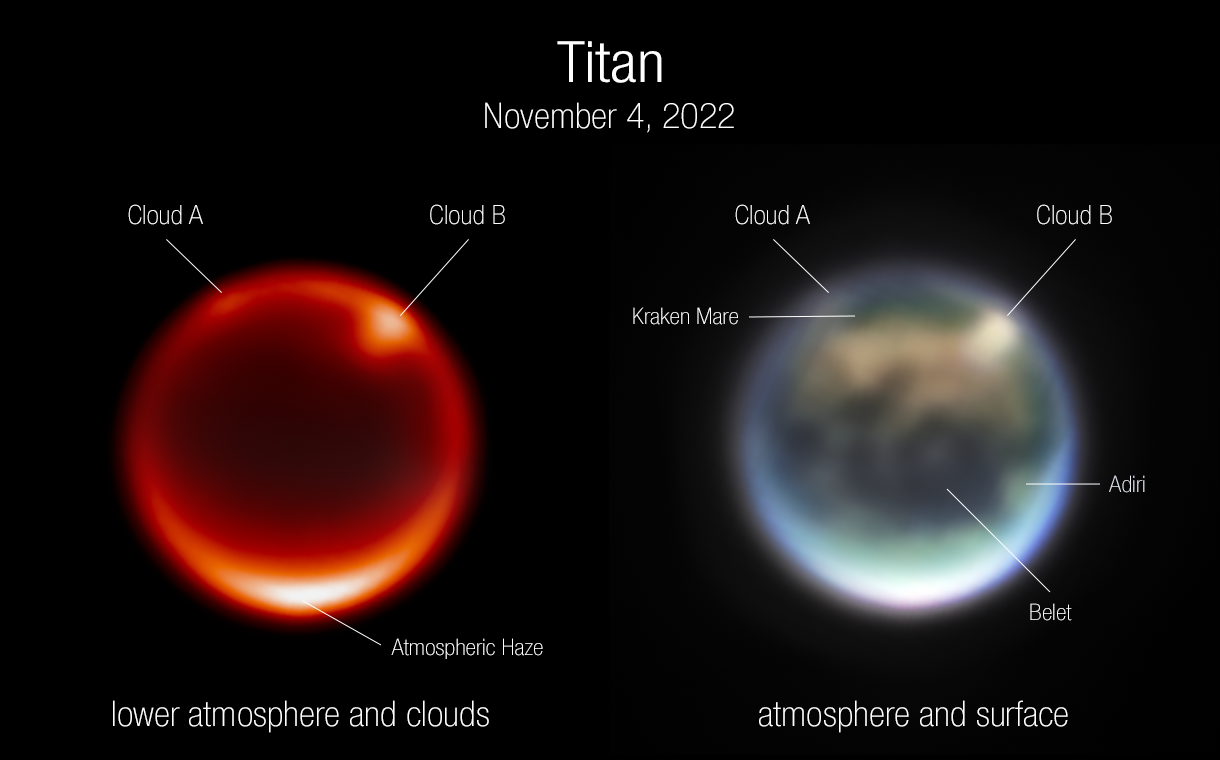
Clouds on Titan observed by the James Webb Space Telescope's NIRCam instrument on November 4, 2022

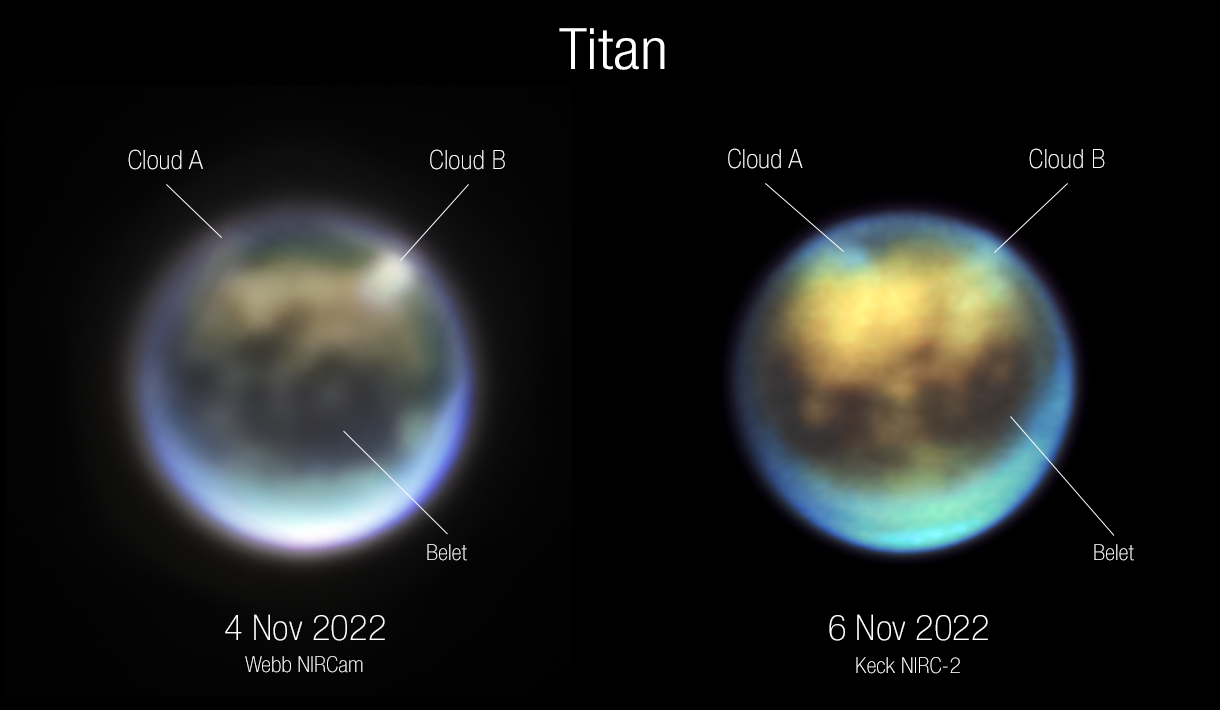
Clouds on Titan observed by NIRCam (left) and the W. M. Keck Observatory's NIRC-2 (right) instrument on November 4 and 6, 2022

Similar to Earth's hydrological cycle, Titan has a methane cycle. Lakes of methane and ethane occur across Titan's polar regions, while methane condenses into clouds in the atmosphere and precipitates onto the surface. Liquid methane then flows into lakes, where some evaporates and returns to the atmosphere as methane vapor, restarting the cycle. However, because methane is lost in the thermosphere, a source must replenish the atmospheric supply.

Solar radiation should have converted all the methane in Titan's atmosphere into more complex hydrocarbons within about 50 million years, a short period compared with the age of the Solar System. This suggests that methane is replenished from a reservoir on or within Titan. Most of Titan's methane is in the atmosphere, where it is transported through the cold trap at the tropopause. Methane circulation therefore influences the atmosphere's radiation balance and the chemistry of its other layers. If Titan has a methane reservoir, the methane cycle could remain stable over geological timescales.

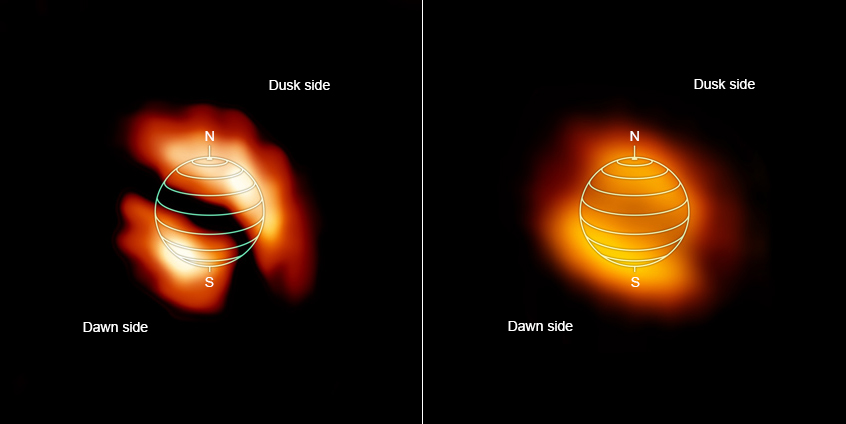
Maps of trace organic gases in Titan's atmosphere: hydrogen isocyanide (HNC, left) and cyanoacetylene (HC_{3}N, right)

The composition of Titan's atmosphere also provides clues about the origin of its methane. Titan's atmosphere contains more than 1,000 times as much methane as carbon monoxide, which appears to rule out a significant contribution from cometary impacts because comets contain more carbon monoxide than methane. The possibility that Titan acquired its atmosphere from the primordial Saturnian nebula during its formation also appears unlikely, because such an atmosphere would be expected to have a composition more similar to that of the solar nebula, including substantial amounts of hydrogen and neon. Several hypotheses propose that methane originated within Titan and was released through cryovolcanic eruptions.

Another possible source is methane clathrates. These compounds consist of gas molecules trapped within a lattice of water ice, forming a cage-like structure. Methane clathrates may exist beneath Titan's icy surface and may have formed early in the moon's history. Their dissociation could release methane into the atmosphere and replenish the supply.

On December 1, 2022, astronomers reported observations from the James Webb Space Telescope of clouds, likely composed of methane, moving across Titan.

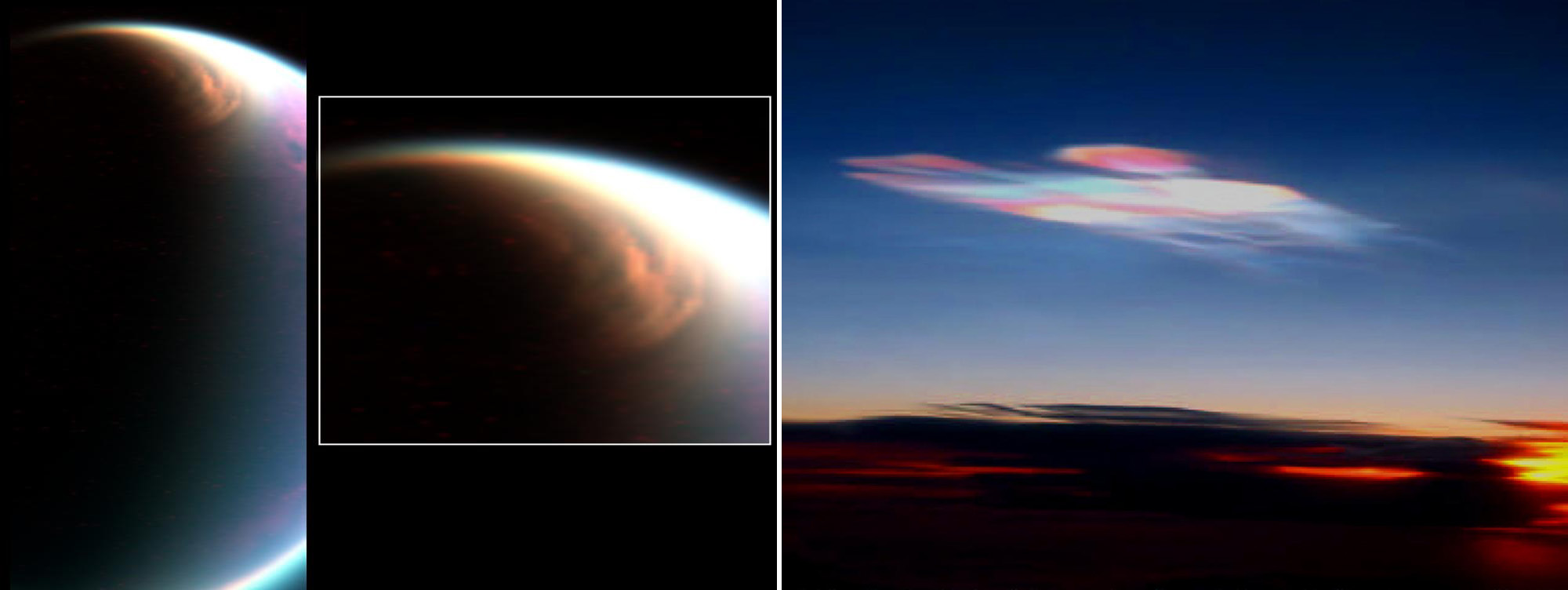
Polar methane clouds on Titan (left) compared with polar stratospheric clouds on Earth (right)

== Sky appearance ==
Simulated sunset on Titan at visible and infrared wavelengths, based on a radiative-transfer model of haze scattering

Saturn setting behind Titan, as observed by the Cassini spacecraft at infrared wavelengths

From the surface, sky brightness and viewing conditions on Titan are expected to differ substantially from those on Earth and Mars because of Titan's greater distance from the Sun (about 10 AU) and its complex atmospheric haze layers. Radiative transfer models have been used to simulate conditions on a typical sunny day at Titan's surface.

In visible light, Titan's daytime sky would appear dark orange and relatively uniform in all directions because of strong Mie scattering by high-altitude haze layers. Model calculations indicate that the daytime sky is about 100–1,000 times dimmer than an afternoon sky on Earth, comparable to conditions under thick smog or dense smoke. Sunsets are expected to be relatively inconspicuous: the Sun would disappear at a zenith angle of approximately 50 degrees (half-way between the zenith and horizon), without a distinct change in color. The sky would then gradually darken until astronomical dusk. However, the surface could remain as bright as Earth's full Moon for up to one Earth day after sunset.

In near-infrared wavelengths, Titan's sunsets would resemble those on Mars or in a dusty desert. Mie scattering has less influence at longer infrared wavelengths, allowing greater variation in sky brightness and color. During the day, the Sun would have a visible corona that would change from white to red over the course of the afternoon. Afternoon sky brightness would be about 100 times lower than on Earth. As evening approached, the Sun would disappear close to the horizon. Titan's atmospheric optical depth is lowest at a wavelength of 5 μm. At this wavelength, atmospheric refraction could allow the Sun to remain visible after it had passed below the horizon. As in images of Martian sunsets taken by Mars rovers, a fan-shaped corona could develop above the Sun because of scattering by high-altitude haze.

Saturn would appear nearly fixed in Titan's sky because Titan is tidally locked to Saturn. However, Saturn would shift by about 3 degrees from east to west over a Titan year because of Titan's orbital eccentricity, producing an effect analogous to Earth's analemma. Sunlight reflected from Saturn, known as Saturnshine, is about 1,000 times weaker than the solar radiation reaching Titan's surface. Although Saturn would appear several times larger than the Moon does in Earth's sky, its disk would be obscured by the brighter Sun during the day. Saturn could become visible at night only at a wavelength of 5 μm, owing to Titan's low atmospheric optical depth at that wavelength and strong 5 μm emission from Saturn's nightside.

In visible light, Saturn would make the sky on Titan's Saturn-facing side slightly brighter, similar to an overcast night on Earth illuminated by a full Moon. Saturn's rings would not be visible because Titan's orbital plane is closely aligned with the plane of Saturn's rings. Saturn would also exhibit phases similar to those of Venus as seen from Earth, causing its reflected light to illuminate part of Titan's surface at night except during eclipses.

From outer space, Cassini images at wavelengths ranging from the near infrared to the ultraviolet showed that Titan's twilight periods, with phase angles greater than 150 degrees, are brighter than its daytime surface. This phenomenon has not been observed on any other planetary body with a thick atmosphere. Titan's unusually bright twilight is attributed to the combination of an atmosphere extending hundreds of kilometers above the surface and strong forward Mie scattering by atmospheric haze. Radiative transfer models have not yet reproduced this effect.

== Evolution ==
The persistence of Titan's dense atmosphere is enigmatic because the atmospheres of the structurally similar Jovian moons Ganymede and Callisto are negligible. Although the difference remains poorly understood, data from recent missions have provided constraints on the evolution of Titan's atmosphere.

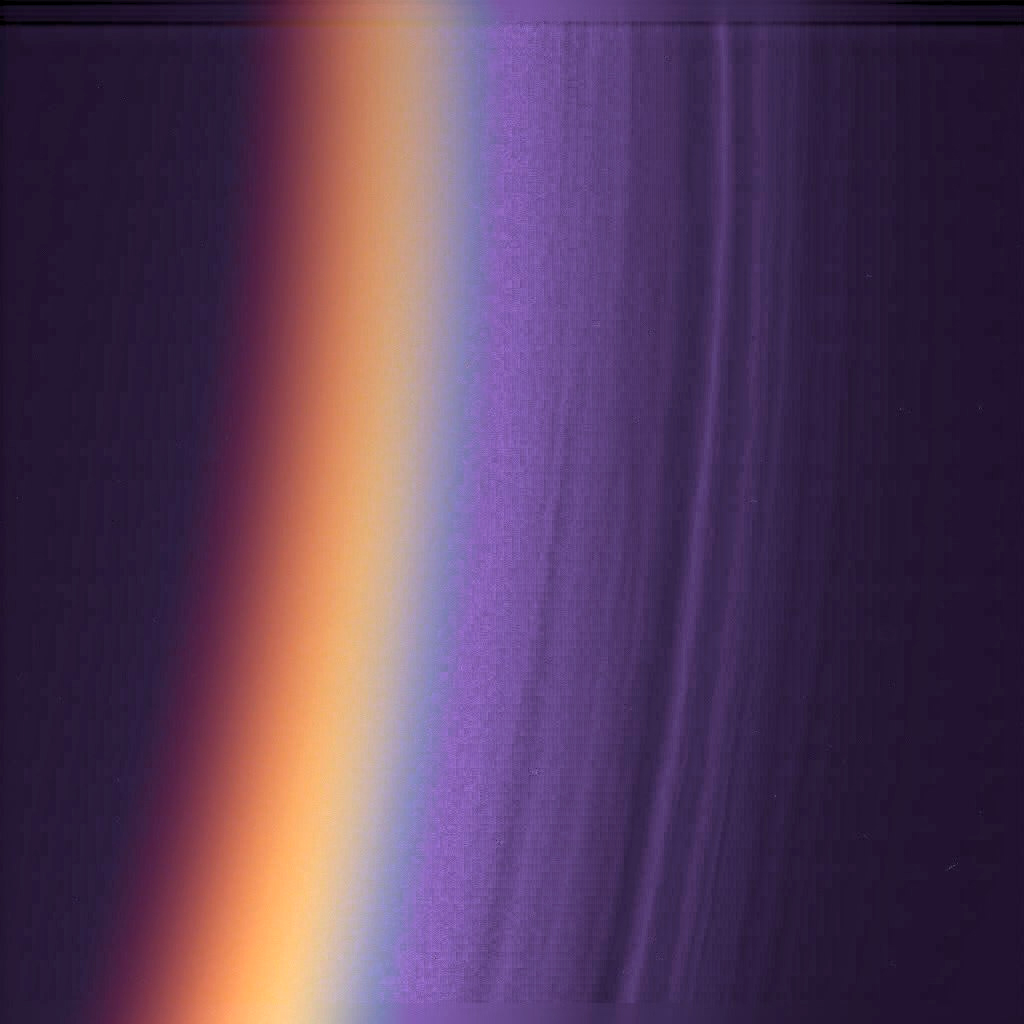
Layers of Titan's atmosphere, imaged by the Cassini spacecraft

At Saturn's distance from the Sun, solar radiation and solar-wind flux are sufficiently weak that elements and compounds that are volatile on the terrestrial planets tend to accumulate in all three phases of matter. Titan's surface temperature is also low, at about 94 K (−179.2 °C; −290.5 °F). Consequently, substances that can become atmospheric constituents account for a much larger fraction of Titan's mass than of Earth's. Current models suggest that only about 50% of Titan's mass consists of silicates, with most of the remainder consisting of water ice and ammonia hydrates (NH_{3}·H_{2}O). Ammonia (NH_{3}), which may have been the original source of Titan's atmospheric nitrogen (N_{2}), may account for as much as 8% of the mass of its ammonia hydrates. Titan is probably differentiated into layers, and the liquid-water layer beneath ice I_{h} may be rich in ammonia.

Available evidence suggests that Titan's atmosphere has lost substantial mass, primarily through atmospheric escape driven by its low gravity and interaction with the solar wind, with photolysis also contributing to the loss. The loss of nitrogen from Titan's early atmosphere can be estimated from the ^{14}N–^{15}N isotopic ratio because the lighter ^{14}N isotope is preferentially lost from the upper atmosphere through photolysis and heating. Because Titan's original ^{14}N–^{15}N is poorly constrained, its early atmosphere may have contained between 1.5 and 100 times as much N_{2} as it does today, although the lower end of this range is more certain. Because N_{2} is the primary component of Titan's atmosphere, accounting for about 98%, the isotopic ratio suggests that much of the atmosphere has been lost over geological time. Nevertheless, Titan's surface pressure remains about 1.5 times that of Earth because Titan probably began with a substantially larger inventory of volatile compounds than Earth or Mars.

Most atmospheric loss may have occurred within 50 million of Titan's accretion, when hydrodynamic escape of light atoms could have carried away a large portion of the atmosphere. This process may have been driven by heating and photolysis caused by the early Sun's stronger output of X-ray and extreme-ultraviolet (XUV) radiation.

The difference between Titan, Callisto, and Ganymede may be related to how their nitrogen was acquired. One possibility is that Titan's N_{2} formed through the photolysis of primordial ammonia (NH_{3}), followed by degassing, rather than through the release of N_{2} from accreted clathrates. If N_{2} had been released from clathrates, the inert primordial isotopes ^{36}Ar and ^{38}Ar would also be expected in Titan's atmosphere, but neither has been detected in significant quantities. Their low abundance also suggests that the temperature of about 40 K (−233.2 °C; −387.7 °F) required to trap N_{2} and these argon isotopes in clathrates was not reached in the Saturnian subnebula. Instead, temperatures may have exceeded 75 K (−198.2 °C; −324.7 °F), limiting the accumulation of ammonia hydrates. Temperatures would have been even higher in the Jovian subnebula because of Jupiter's greater gravitational energy release, greater mass, and closer distance to the Sun. This may have greatly reduced the amount of ammonia accreted by Callisto and Ganymede. Their resulting N_{2} atmospheres may have been too thin to survive atmospheric erosion as effectively as Titan's.

An alternative explanation is that cometary impacts release more energy on Callisto and Ganymede than on Titan because Jupiter's stronger gravitational field accelerates incoming comets to higher velocities. Such impacts could erode the atmospheres of Callisto and Ganymede, whereas cometary material could contribute to Titan's atmosphere. However, the deuterium-to-hydrogen (D/H) ratio of Titan's atmosphere is (2.3±0.5)×10^{−4}, nearly 1.5 times lower than the ratio measured in comets. This difference suggests that cometary material is unlikely to be the primary source of Titan's atmosphere. Titan's atmosphere also contains more than 1,000 times as much methane as carbon monoxide. This further argues against a major cometary contribution because comets generally contain more carbon monoxide than methane.

== See also ==
- Atmosphere of Saturn
- Colonization of Titan
- Geology of Titan
- Life on Titan
