= Life on Venus =

Scientific assessments on the microbial habitability of Venus

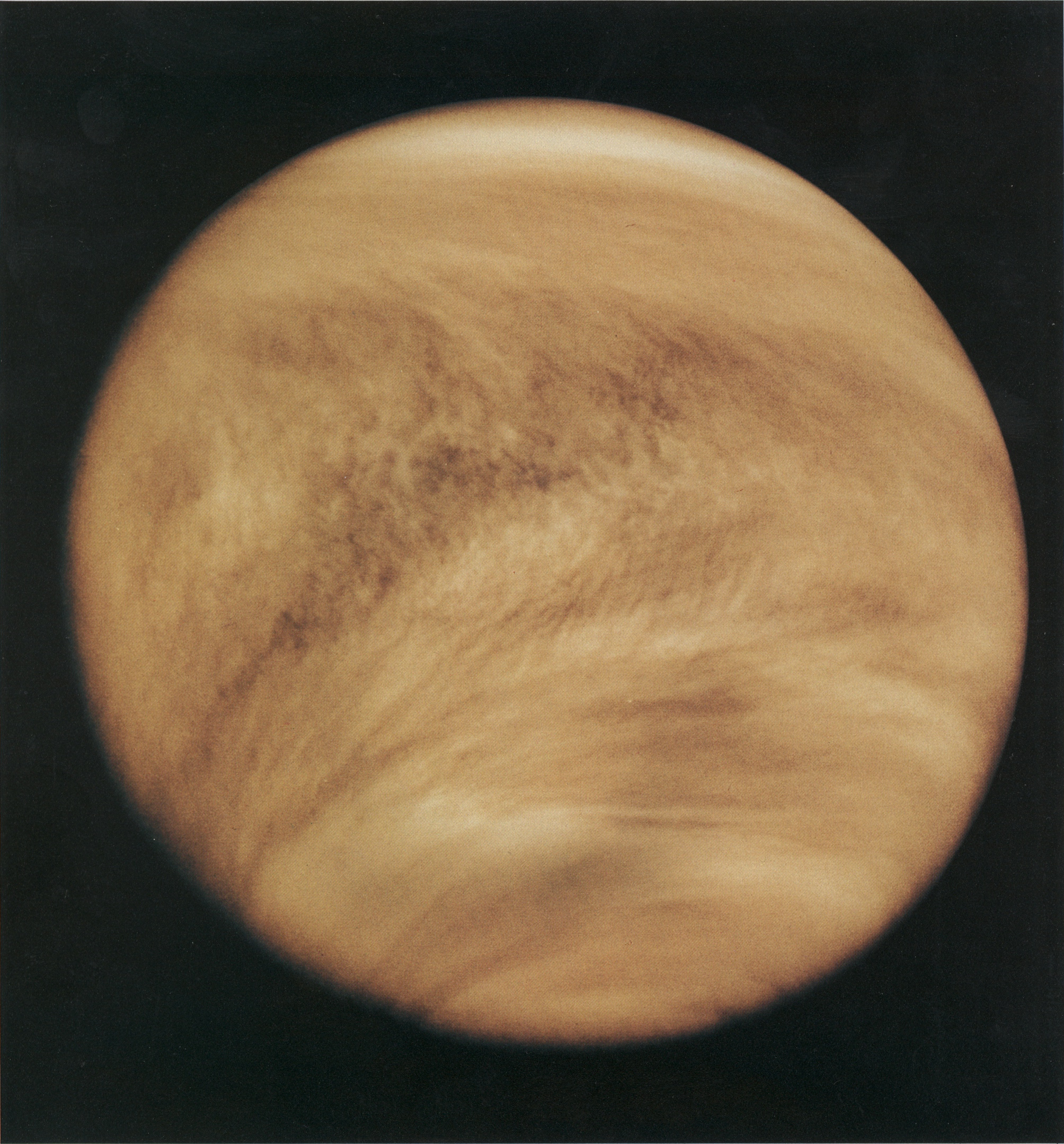
The atmosphere of Venus as viewed in ultraviolet by the Pioneer Venus Orbiter in 1979. The cause of the dark streaks in the clouds is not yet known.

The possibility of life on Venus is a subject of interest in astrobiology due to Venus's proximity and similarities to Earth. To date, no definitive evidence has been found of past or present life there. In the early 1960s, studies conducted via spacecraft demonstrated that the current Venusian environment is extreme compared to Earth's. Studies continue to question whether life could have existed on the planet's surface before a runaway greenhouse effect took hold, and whether a relict biosphere could persist high in the modern Venusian atmosphere.

With extreme surface temperatures reaching nearly 735 K (462 °C; 863 °F) and an atmospheric pressure 92 times that of Earth, the conditions on Venus make water-based life as we know it impossible on the surface of the planet. However, a few scientists have speculated that thermoacidophilic extremophile microorganisms might exist in the temperate, acidic upper layers of the Venusian atmosphere. In September 2020, research was published that reported the presence of phosphine in the planet's atmosphere, a potential biosignature. However, doubts have been cast on these observations.

As of 8 February 2021, an updated status of studies considering the possible detection of lifeforms on Venus (via phosphine) and Mars (via methane) was reported, though whether these gases are present is still unclear. On 2 June 2021, NASA announced two new related missions to Venus: DAVINCI and VERITAS.

== Surface conditions ==
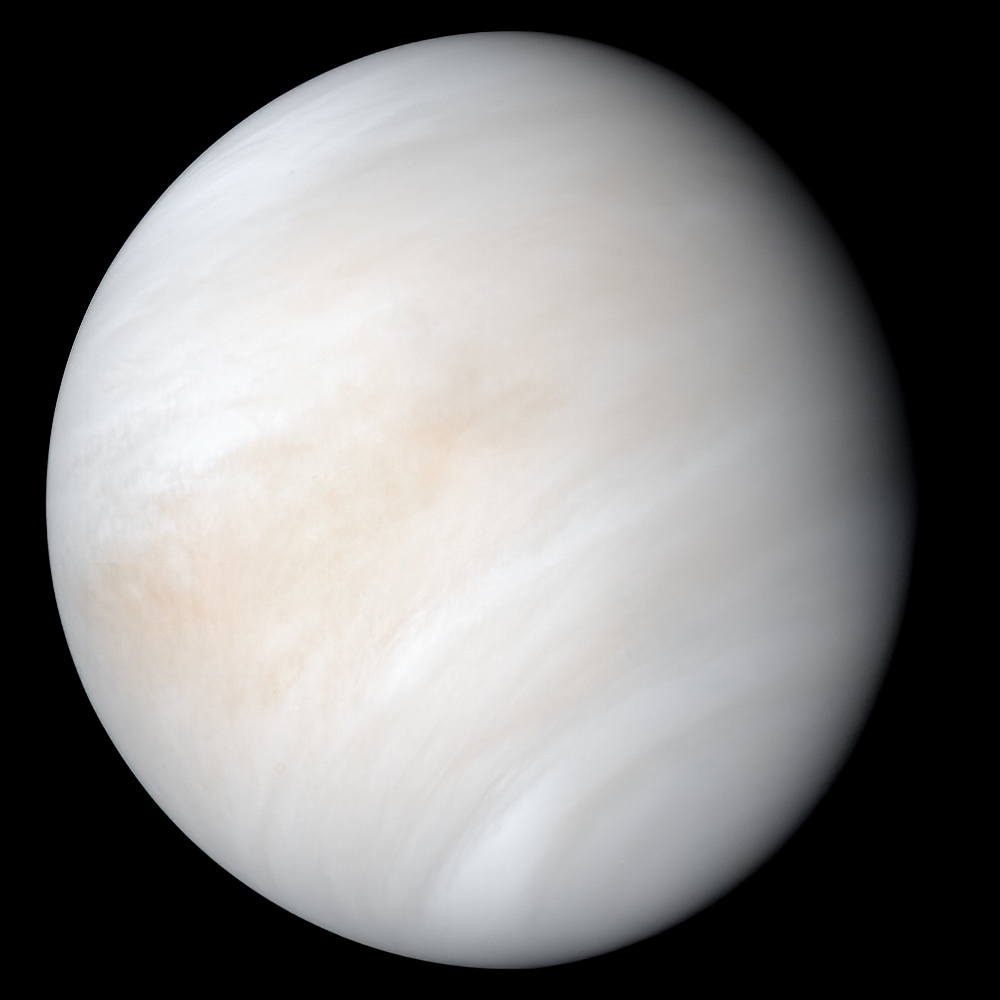
Venus as photographed by Mariner 10

Because Venus is completely covered in clouds, human knowledge of surface conditions was largely speculative until the space probe era. Until the mid-20th century, the surface environment of Venus was believed to be similar to Earth, hence it was widely believed that Venus could harbor life. In 1870, the British astronomer Richard A. Proctor said the existence of life on Venus was impossible near its equator, but possible near its poles.

Microwave observations published by C. Mayer et al. in 1958 indicated a high-temperature source (600 K). Strangely, millimetre-band observations made by A. D. Kuzmin indicated much lower temperatures. Two competing theories explained the unusual radio spectrum, one suggesting the high temperatures originated in the ionosphere, and another suggesting a hot planetary surface.

In 1962, Mariner 2, the first successful mission to Venus, measured the planet's temperature for the first time, and found it to be "about 500 degrees Celsius (900 degrees Fahrenheit)." Since then, increasingly clear evidence from various space probes showed Venus has an extreme climate, with a greenhouse effect generating a constant temperature of about 500 °C (932 °F) on the surface. The atmosphere contains sulfuric acid clouds. In 1968, NASA reported that air pressure on the Venusian surface was 75 to 100 times that of Earth. This was later revised to 92 bars, almost 100 times that of Earth and similar to that of more than 1,000 m (3,300 ft) deep in Earth's oceans. In such an environment, and given the hostile characteristics of the Venusian weather, life as we know it is highly unlikely to occur.

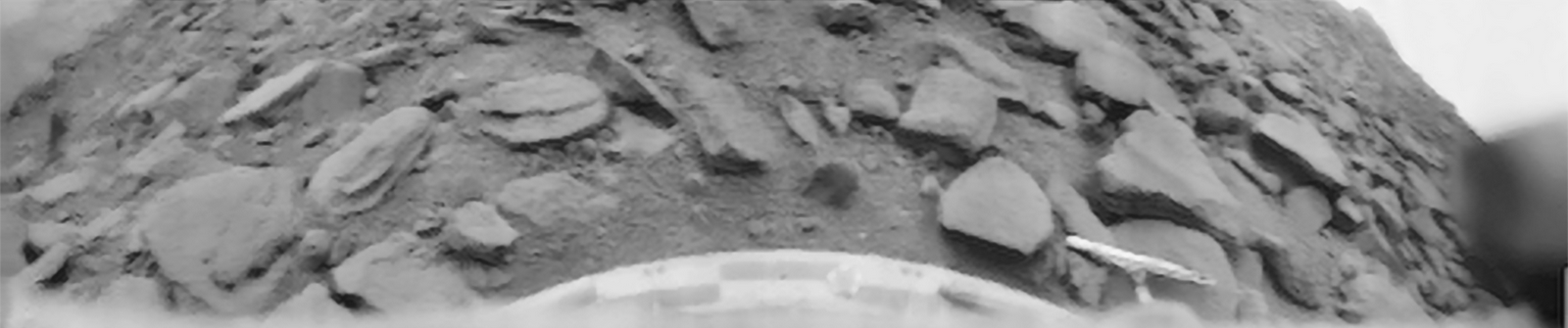
Venera 9 returned the first image from the surface of another planet in 1975.

== Past habitability potential ==
Scientists have speculated that if liquid water existed on its surface before the runaway greenhouse effect heated the planet, microbial life may have formed on Venus, but it may no longer exist. Assuming the process that delivered water to Earth was common to all the planets near the habitable zone, it has been estimated that liquid water could have existed on its surface for up to 600 million years during and shortly after the Late Heavy Bombardment, which could be enough time for simple life to form, but this figure can vary from as little as a few million years to as much as a few billion. A study published in September 2019 concluded that Venus may have had surface water and a habitable condition for around 3 billion years and may have been in this condition until 700 to 750 million years ago. If correct, this would have been an ample amount of time for the formation of life, and for microbial life to evolve to become aerial.

Since then, there have been more studies and climate models, with different conclusions. For example, a study from 2023 concluded that only hypothetical habitable eras that ended prior to 3 billion years ago are consistent with Ar, O_{2}, H_{2}O, and CO concentrations in Venus’s modern atmosphere. In addition, a study from 2024 found that Venusian volcanic gases have at most a 6% water mole fraction, which is substantially drier than terrestrial magmas degassed at similar conditions, indicating that Venus has never been liquid-water habitable.

There has been very little analysis of Venusian surface material, so it is possible that evidence of past life, if it ever existed, could be found with a probe capable of enduring Venus's current extreme surface conditions. However, the resurfacing of the planet in the past 500 million years means that it is unlikely that ancient surface rocks remain, especially those containing the mineral tremolite which, theoretically, could have encased some biosignatures.

Studies reported on 26 October 2023 suggest Venus, for the first time, may have had plate tectonics during ancient times, and, as a result, may have had a more habitable environment, and possibly one capable of life forms. However, because dry Venusian eruptions suggest that Venus never had oceans on its surface, Venus has likely been a inhospitable world for its entire history.

=== Suggested panspermia events ===
It has been speculated that life on Venus may have come to Earth through lithopanspermia, via the ejection of icy bolides that facilitated the preservation of multicellular life on long interplanetary voyages. "Current models indicate that Venus may have been habitable. Complex life may have evolved on the highly irradiated Venus, and transferred to Earth on asteroids. This model fits the pattern of pulses of highly developed life appearing, diversifying and going extinct with astonishing rapidity through the Cambrian and Ordovician periods, and also explains the extraordinary genetic variety which appeared over this period." This theory, however, is a fringe one, and is seen as being unlikely.

=== Cataclysmic events ===
Between 700 and 750 million years ago, a near-global resurfacing event triggered the release of carbon dioxide from rock on the planet, which transformed its climate. In addition, according to a study from researchers at the University of California, Riverside, Venus would be able to support life if Jupiter had not altered its orbit around the Sun.

== Present habitability of its atmosphere ==
=== Atmospheric conditions ===
Although there is little possibility of existing life near the surface of Venus, the altitudes about 50 km (31 mi) above the surface have a mild temperature, and hence there are still some opinions in favor of such a possibility in the atmosphere of Venus. The idea was first brought forward by German physicist Heinz Haber in 1950. In September 1967, Carl Sagan and Harold Morowitz published an analysis of the issue of life on Venus in the journal Nature.

In the analysis of mission data from the Venera, Pioneer Venus and Magellan missions, it was discovered that carbonyl sulfide, hydrogen sulfide and sulfur dioxide were present together in the upper atmosphere. Venera also detected large amounts of toxic chlorine just below the Venusian cloud cover. Carbonyl sulfide is difficult to produce inorganically, but it can be produced by volcanism. Sulfuric acid is produced in the upper atmosphere by the Sun's photochemical action on carbon dioxide, sulfur dioxide, and water vapor. The re-analysis of Pioneer Venus data in 2020 has found part of chlorine and all of hydrogen sulfide spectral features are instead phosphine-related, meaning lower than thought concentration of chlorine and non-detection of hydrogen sulfide.

Solar radiation constrains the atmospheric habitable zone to between 51 km (65 °C) and 62 km (−20 °C) altitude, within the acidic clouds. It has been speculated that clouds in the atmosphere of Venus could contain chemicals that can initiate forms of biological activity and have zones where photophysical and chemical conditions allow for Earth-like phototrophy.

=== Potential biomarkers ===
It has been speculated that any hypothetical microorganisms inhabiting the atmosphere, if present, could employ ultraviolet light (UV) emitted by the Sun as an energy source, which could be an explanation for the dark lines (called "unknown UV absorber") observed in the UV photographs of Venus. The existence of this "unknown UV absorber" prompted Carl Sagan to publish an article in 1963 proposing the hypothesis of microorganisms in the upper atmosphere as the agent absorbing the UV light.

In August 2019, astronomers reported a newly discovered long-term pattern of UV light absorbance and albedo changes in the atmosphere of Venus and its weather, that is caused by "unknown absorbers" that may include unknown chemicals or even large colonies of microorganisms high up in the atmosphere.

In January 2020, astronomers reported evidence that suggests Venus is currently (within 2.5 million years from present) volcanically active, and the residue from such activity may be a potential source of nutrients for possible microorganisms in the Venusian atmosphere.

In 2021, it was suggested the color of "unknown UV absorber" match that of "red oil", a known substance comprising a mix of organic carbon compounds dissolved in concentrated sulfuric acid.

==== Phosphine ====
Research published in September 2020 indicated the detection of phosphine (PH_{3}) in Venus's atmosphere by Atacama Large Millimeter Array (ALMA) telescope that was not linked to any known abiotic method of production present or possible under Venusian conditions. However, the claimed detection of phosphine was disputed by several subsequent studies. A molecule like phosphine is not expected to persist in the Venusian atmosphere since, under the ultraviolet radiation, it will eventually react with water and carbon dioxide. PH_{3} is associated with anaerobic ecosystems on Earth, and may indicate life on anoxic planets. Related studies suggested that the initially claimed concentration of phosphine (20 ppb) in the clouds of Venus indicated a "plausible amount of life," and further, that the typical predicted biomass densities were "several orders of magnitude lower than the average biomass density of Earth's aerial biosphere." As of 2019, no known abiotic process generates phosphine gas on terrestrial planets (as opposed to gas giants) in appreciable quantities. The phosphine can be generated by geological process of weathering olivine lavas containing inorganic phosphides, but this process requires an ongoing and massive volcanic activity. Therefore, detectable amounts of phosphine could indicate life. In July 2021, a volcanic origin was proposed for phosphine, by extrusion from the mantle.

In a statement published on October 5, 2020, on the website of the International Astronomical Union's commission F3 on astrobiology, the authors of the September 2020 paper about phosphine were accused of unethical behaviour and criticized for being unscientific and misleading the public. Members of that commission have since distanced themselves from the IAU statement, claiming that it had been published without their knowledge or approval. The statement was removed from the IAU website shortly thereafter. The IAU's media contact Lars Lindberg Christensen stated that IAU did not agree with the content of the letter, and that it had been published by a group within the F3 commission, not IAU itself.

By late October 2020, the review of data processing of the data collected by both ALMA used in original publication of September 2020, and later James Clerk Maxwell Telescope (JCMT) data, has revealed background calibration errors resulting in multiple spurious lines, including the spectral feature of phosphine. Re-analysis of data with a proper subtraction of background either does not result in the detection of the phosphine or detects it with concentration of 1ppb, 20 times below original estimate.

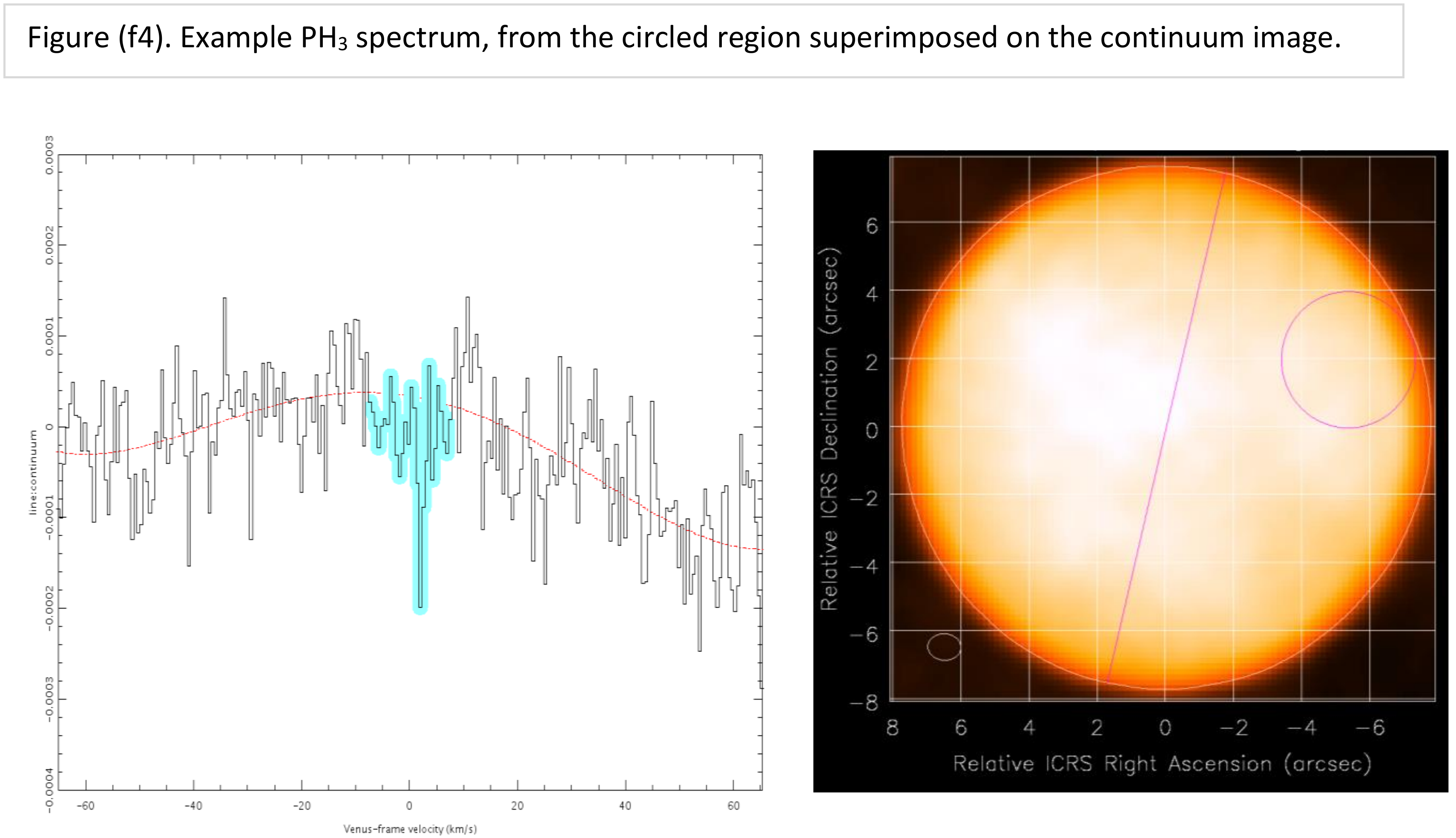
Example PH_{3} spectrum, from the circled region superimposed on the continuum image based on a re-analysis of the re-processed data.

On 16 November 2020, ALMA staff released a corrected version of the data used by the scientists of the original study published on 14 September. On the same day, authors of this study published a re-analysis as a preprint using the new data that concludes the planet-averaged PH_{3} abundance to be ~7 times lower than what they detected with data of the previous ALMA processing, to likely vary by location and to be reconcilable with the JCMT detection of ~20 times this abundance if it varies substantially in time. They also respond to points raised in a critical study by Villanueva et al. that challenged their conclusions and find that so far the presence of no other compound can explain the data. The authors reported that more advanced processing of the JCMT data was ongoing.

===== Other measurements of phosphine =====
Re-analysis of the in situ data gathered by Pioneer Venus Multiprobe in 1978 has also revealed the presence of phosphine and its dissociation products in the atmosphere of Venus. In 2021, a further analysis detected trace amounts of ethane, hydrogen sulfide, nitrite, nitrate, hydrogen cyanide, and possibly ammonia.

The phosphine signal was also detected in data collected using the JCMT, though much weaker than that found using ALMA.

In October 2020, a reanalysis of archived infrared spectrum measurement in 2015 did not reveal any phosphine in the Venusian atmosphere, placing an upper limit of phosphine volume concentration 5 parts per billion (a quarter of value measured in radio band in 2020). However, the wavelength used in these observations (10 microns) would only have detected phosphine at the very top of the clouds of the atmosphere of Venus.

BepiColombo, launched in 2018 to study Mercury, flew by Venus on October 15, 2020, and on August 10, 2021. Johannes Benkhoff, project scientist, believed BepiColombo's MERTIS (Mercury Radiometer and Thermal Infrared Spectrometer) could possibly detect phosphine, but "we do not know if our instrument is sensitive enough".

In 2022, observations of Venus using the SOFIA airborne infrared telescope failed to detect phosphine, with an upper limit on the concentration of 0.8 ppb announced for Venusian altitudes 75–110 km. A subsequent reanalysis of the SOFIA data using nonstandard calibration techniques resulted in a phosphine detection at the concentration level ~ 1 ppb,. If present, phosphine appears to be more abundant in pre-morning parts of the Venusian atmosphere.

In 2024, the existence of phosphine on Venus was further corroborated with new observations by the JCMT-Venus programme.

===== Planned measurements of phosphine levels =====
ALMA restarted 17 March 2021 after a year-long shutdown in response to the COVID-19 pandemic and may enable further observations that could provide insights for the ongoing investigation.

Despite controversies, NASA is in the beginning stages of sending a future mission to Venus. The Venus Emissivity, Radio Science, InSAR, Topography, and Spectroscopy mission (VERITAS) would carry radar to view through the clouds to get new images of the surface, of much higher quality than those last photographed thirty-one years ago. The other, Deep Atmosphere Venus Investigation of Noble gases, Chemistry, and Imaging Plus (DAVINCI+) would actually go through the atmosphere, sampling the air as it descends, to hopefully detect the phosphine. In June 2021, NASA announced DAVINCI+ and VERITAS would be selected from four mission concepts picked in February 2020 as part of the NASA's Discovery 2019 competition for launch in the 2028–2030 time frame.

There is also an ongoing long-term monitoring campaign with JCMT to study phosphine and other molecules in Venus's atmosphere.

===== Confusion between phosphine and sulfur dioxide lines =====
According to new research announced in January 2021, the spectral line at 266.94 GHz attributed to phosphine in the clouds of Venus was more likely to have been produced by sulfur dioxide in the mesosphere. That claim was refuted in April 2021 for being inconsistent with the available data. The detection of PH_{3} in the Venusian atmosphere with ALMA was recovered to ~7 ppb. By August 2021 it was found the suspected contamination by sulfur dioxide was contributing only 10% to the tentative signal in phosphine spectral line band in ALMA spectra taken in 2019, and about 50% in ALMA spectra taken in 2017.

== Speculative biochemistry of Venusian life ==
Conventional water-based biochemistry was claimed to be impossible in Venusian conditions. In June 2021, calculations of water activity levels in Venusian clouds based on data from space probes showed these to be two magnitudes too low at the examined places for any known extremophile bacteria to survive. Alternative calculations based on the estimation of energy costs of obtaining hydrogen in Venus conditions compared to Earth conditions indicate only minor (6.5%) additional energy expenditure during Venusian photosynthesis of glucose.

In August 2021, it was suggested that even saturated hydrocarbons are unstable in ultra-acid conditions of Venusian clouds, making cellular membranes of Venusian life concepts problematic. Instead, it was proposed that Venusian "life" may be based on self-replicating molecular components of "red oil" – a known class of substances consisting of a mixture of polycyclic carbon compounds dissolved in concentrated sulfuric acid. Conversely, in September 2024 it was reported what while short-chain fatty acids are unstable in concentrated sulfuric acid, it is possible to construct their acid-stable analogs capable of bilayer membrane formation by replacing carboxylic groups with sulfate, amine or phosphate groups. Also, 19 of the 20 protein-making amino acids (with the exception of tryptophan) and all nucleic acids are stable under Venusian cloud conditions.

In December 2021, it was suggested Venusian life – as the chemically most plausible cause – may photochemically produce ammonia from available chemicals, resulting in life-bearing droplets becoming a slurry of ammonium sulfite with a less acidic pH of 1. These droplets would deplete sulfur dioxide in upper cloud layers as they settle down, explaining the observed distribution of sulfur dioxide in the atmosphere of Venus, and may make the clouds no more acidic than some extreme Earth environments that harbor life.

== Speculative life cycles of Venusian life ==
The hypothesis paper in 2020 has suggested the microbial life of Venus may have a two-stage life cycle. The metabolically active part of such a cycle would have to happen within cloud droplets to avoid a fatal loss of liquid. After such droplets grow large enough to sink under the force of gravity, organisms would fall with them into hotter lower layers and desiccate, becoming small and light enough to be raised again to the habitable layer by gravity waves at a timescale of approximately a year.

The hypothesis paper in 2021 has criticized the concept above, pointing to the large stagnancy of lower haze layers in Venus making return from the haze layer to relatively habitable clouds problematic even for small particles. Instead, an in-cloud evolution model was proposed where organisms are evolving to become maximally absorptive (dark) for the given amount of biomass and the darker, solar-heated areas of cloud are kept afloat by thermal updrafts initiated by organisms itself. Alternatively, microorganisms can be kept aloft by negative photophoresis effect.

== Habitability of Venus for humans ==
While the surface of Venus is very inhospitable to humans, conditions at altitudes of 50 km above the surface have been identified to be not only hospitable for indigenous but also for human life, more so than anywhere else in the Solar System other than Earth. Conditions, from atmospheric pressure, gravity, and temperature to radiation, but except chemical, are all very much like conditions on Earth at surface level. Because of this prospect, floating habitats for humans at such altitudes have been suggested for humans going to Venus.

== See also ==
- Colonization of Venus – Engineering the global environment of Venus to make it suitable for humans
- Proposed missions to Venus
- Terraforming of Venus

Possible life on other bodies of the Solar System

- Life on Enceladus
- Life on Europa
- Life on Mars
- Life on Titan
