= Life on Titan =

Scientific assessments on the microbial habitability of Titan

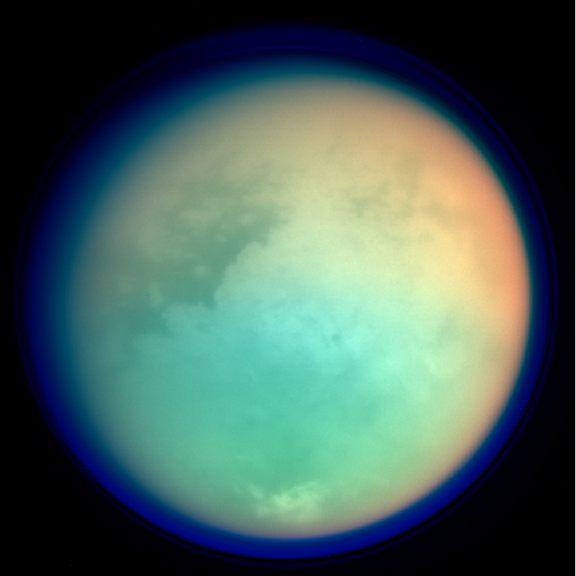
Multi-spectral view of Titan

Whether there is life on Titan, the largest moon of Saturn, is currently an open question and a topic of scientific assessment and research. Titan is far colder than Earth, but of all the places in the Solar System, Titan is the only place besides Earth known to have surface liquids today, in the form of rivers, lakes, and seas on its surface. Its thick atmosphere is chemically active and rich in carbon compounds. On the surface there are small and large bodies of both liquid methane and ethane, and it is likely that there is a layer of liquid water under its ice shell. Some scientists speculate that these liquid mixes may provide prebiotic chemistry for living cells different from those on Earth.

In June 2010, scientists analyzing data from the Cassini–Huygens mission reported anomalies in the atmosphere near the surface which could be consistent with the presence of methane-producing organisms, but may alternatively be due to non-living chemical or meteorological processes. The Cassini–Huygens mission was not equipped to look directly for micro-organisms or to provide a thorough inventory of complex organic compounds.

== Chemistry ==
Titan's consideration as an environment for the study of prebiotic chemistry or potentially exotic life stems in large part due to the diversity of the organic chemistry that occurs in its atmosphere, driven by photochemical reactions in its outer layers. The following chemicals have been detected in Titan's upper atmosphere by Cassini's mass spectrometer:

Study	Magee, 1050 km	Cui, 1050 km	Cui, 1077 km	Waite et al., 1000–1045 km
Density (cm^{−3})	(3.18±0.71) × 10^{9}	(4.84±0.01) × 10^{9}	(2.27±0.01) × 10^{9}	(3.19, 7.66) × 10^{9}
Proportions of different species
Nitrogen	(96.3±0.44)%	(97.8±0.2)%	(97.4±0.5)%	(95.5, 97.5)%
^{14}N^{15}N	(1.08±0.06)%			
Methane	(2.17±0.44)%	(1.78±0.01)%	(2.20±0.01)%	(1.32, 2.42)%
^{13}CH_{4}	(2.52±0.46) × 10^{−4}			
Hydrogen	(3.38±0.23) × 10^{−3}	(3.72±0.01) × 10^{−3}	(3.90±0.01) × 10^{−3}	
Acetylene	(3.42±0.14) × 10^{−4}	(1.68±0.01) × 10^{−4}	(1.57±0.01) × 10^{−4}	(1.02, 3.20) × 10^{−4}
Ethylene	(3.91±0.23) × 10^{−4}	(5.04±0.04) × 10^{−4}	(4.62±0.04) × 10^{−4}	(0.72, 1.02) × 10^{−3}
Ethane	(4.57±0.74) × 10^{−5}	(4.05±0.19) × 10^{−5}	(2.68±0.19) × 10^{−5}	(0.78, 1.50) × 10^{−5}
Hydrogen cyanide	(2.44±0.10) × 10^{−4}			
^{40}Ar	(1.26±0.05) × 10^{−5}	(1.25±0.02) × 10^{−5}	(1.10±0.03) × 10^{−5}	
Propyne	(9.20±0.46) × 10^{−6}	(9.02±0.22) × 10^{−6}	(6.31±0.24) × 10^{−6}	(0.55, 1.31) × 10^{−5}
Propene	(2.33±0.18) × 10^{−6}			(0.69, 3.59) × 10^{−4}
Propane	(2.87±0.26) × 10^{−6}	<1.84 × 10^{−6}	<2.16e-6(3.90±0.01) × 10^{−6}	
Diacetylene	(5.55±0.25) × 10^{−6}	(4.92±0.10) × 10^{−6}	(2.46±0.10) × 10^{−6}	(1.90, 6.55) × 10^{−6}
Cyanogen	(2.14±0.12) × 10^{−6}	(1.70±0.07) × 10^{−6}	(1.45±0.09) × 10^{−6}	(1.74, 6.07) × 10^{−6}
Cyanoacetylene	(1.54±0.09) × 10^{−6}	(1.43±0.06) × 10^{−6}	<8.27 × 10^{−7}	
Acrylonitrile	(4.39±0.51) × 10^{−7}	<4.00 × 10^{−7}	<5.71 × 10^{−7}	
Propanenitrile	(2.87±0.49) × 10^{−7}			
Benzene	(2.50±0.12) × 10^{−6}	(2.42±0.05) × 10^{−6}	(3.90±0.01) × 10^{−7}	(5.5, 7.5) × 10^{−3}
Toluene	(2.51±0.95) × 10^{−8}	<8.73 × 10^{−8}	(3.90±0.01) × 10^{−7}	(0.83, 5.60) × 10^{−6}

As mass spectrometry identifies the atomic mass of a compound but not its structure, additional research is required to identify the exact compound that has been detected. Where the compounds have been identified in the literature, their chemical formula has been replaced by their name above. The figures in Magee (2009) involve corrections for high pressure background. Other compounds believed to be indicated by the data and associated models include ammonia, polyynes, amines, ethylenimine, deuterium hydride, allene, 1,3 butadiene and any number of more complex chemicals in lower concentrations, as well as carbon dioxide and limited quantities of water vapour.

== Surface temperature ==
Due to its distance from the Sun, Titan is much colder than Earth. Its surface temperature is about 94 K (−179 °C, or −290 °F). At these temperatures, water ice—if present—does not melt, evaporate or sublimate, but remains solid. Because of the extreme cold and also because of lack of carbon dioxide (CO_{2}) in the atmosphere, scientists such as Jonathan Lunine have viewed Titan less as a likely habitat for extraterrestrial life, than as an experiment for examining hypotheses on the conditions that prevailed prior to the appearance of life on Earth. Even though the usual surface temperature on Titan is not compatible with liquid water, calculations by Lunine and others suggest that meteor strikes could create occasional "impact oases"—craters in which liquid water might persist for hundreds of years or longer, which would enable water-based organic chemistry.

However, Lunine does not rule out life in an environment of liquid methane and ethane, and has written about what discovery of such a life form (even if very primitive) would imply about the prevalence of life in the universe.

=== Past hypothesis about the temperature ===
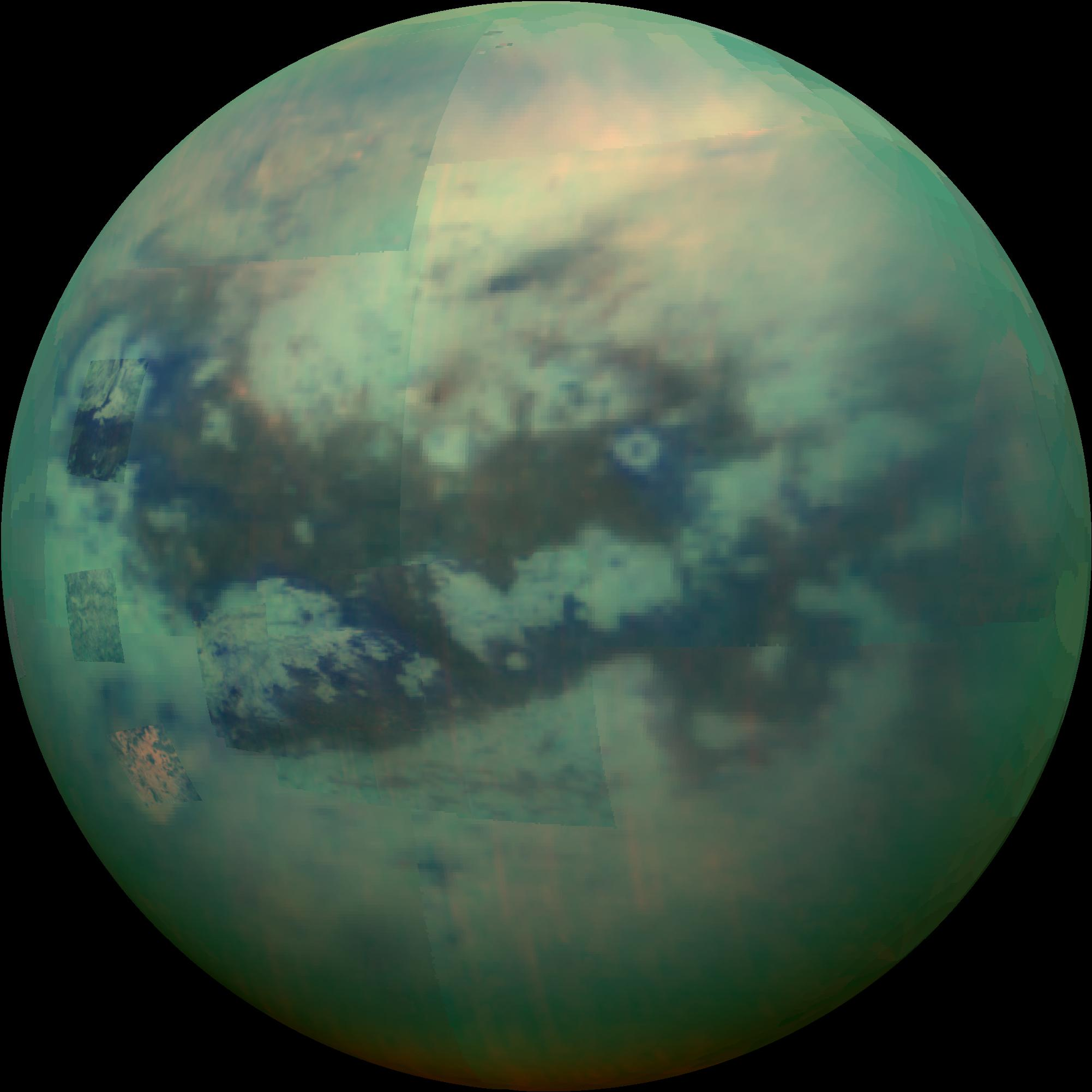
Titan – infrared view (November 13, 2015).

In the 1970s, astronomers found unexpectedly high levels of infrared emissions from Titan. One possible explanation for this was the surface was warmer than expected, due to a greenhouse effect. Some estimates of the surface temperature even approached temperatures in the cooler regions of Earth. There was, however, another possible explanation for the infrared emissions: Titan's surface was very cold, but the upper atmosphere was heated due to absorption of ultraviolet light by molecules such as ethane, ethylene and acetylene.

In September 1979, Pioneer 11, the first space probe to conduct fly-by observations of Saturn and its moons, sent data showing Titan's surface to be extremely cold by Earth standards, and much below the temperatures generally associated with planetary habitability.

=== Future temperature ===
Titan may become warmer in the future. Five to six billion years from now, as the Sun becomes a red giant, surface temperatures could rise to ~200 K (−70 °C), high enough for stable oceans of a water–ammonia mixture to exist on its surface. As the Sun's ultraviolet output decreases, the haze in Titan's upper atmosphere will be depleted, lessening the anti-greenhouse effect on its surface and enabling the greenhouse effect created by atmospheric methane to play a far greater role. These conditions together could create an environment agreeable to exotic forms of life, and will persist for several hundred million years. This was sufficient time for simple life to evolve on Earth, although the presence of ammonia on Titan could cause the same chemical reactions to proceed more slowly.

== Absence of surface liquid water ==
The lack of liquid water on Titan's surface was cited by NASA astrobiologist Andrew Pohorille in 2009 as an argument against life there. Pohorille considers that water is important not only as the solvent used by "the only life we know" but also because its chemical properties are "uniquely suited to promote self-organization of organic matter". He has questioned whether prospects for finding life on Titan's surface are sufficient to justify the expense of a mission that would look for it.

== Possible subsurface liquid water ==
Laboratory simulations have led to the suggestion that enough organic material exists on Titan to start a chemical evolution analogous to what is thought to have started life on Earth. While the analogy assumes the presence of liquid water for longer periods than is currently observable, several hypotheses suggest that liquid water from an impact could be preserved under a frozen isolation layer. It has also been proposed that ammonia oceans could exist deep below the surface; one model suggests an ammonia–water solution as much as 200 km deep beneath a water ice crust, conditions that, "while extreme by terrestrial standards, are such that life could indeed survive". Heat transfer between the interior and upper layers would be critical in sustaining any sub-surface oceanic life. Detection of microbial life on Titan would depend on its biogenic effects. For example, the atmospheric methane and nitrogen could be examined for biogenic origin.

Data published in 2012 obtained from NASA's Cassini spacecraft, have strengthened evidence that Titan likely harbors a layer of liquid water under its ice shell.

== Formation of complex molecules ==
Titan is the only known natural satellite (moon) in the Solar System that has a fully developed atmosphere that consists of more than trace gases. Titan's atmosphere is thick, chemically active, and is known to be rich in organic compounds; this has led to speculation about whether chemical precursors of life may have been generated there. The atmosphere also contains hydrogen gas, which is cycling through the atmosphere and the surface environment, and which living things comparable to Earth methanogens could combine with some of the organic compounds (such as acetylene) to obtain energy.

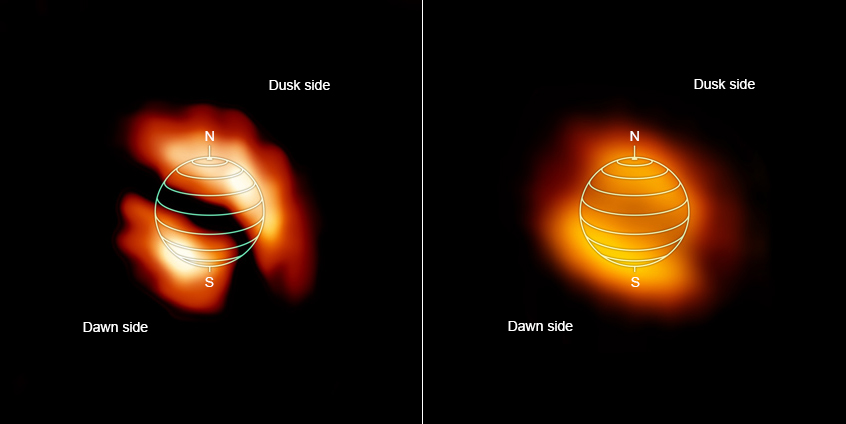
Trace organic gases in Titan's atmosphere—HNC (left) and HC_{3}N (right).

The Miller–Urey experiment and several following experiments have shown that with an atmosphere similar to that of Titan and the addition of UV radiation, complex molecules and polymer substances like tholins can be generated. The reaction starts with dissociation of nitrogen and methane, forming hydrogen cyanide and acetylene. Further reactions have been studied extensively.

In October 2010, Sarah Hörst of the University of Arizona reported finding the five nucleotide bases—building blocks of DNA and RNA—among the many compounds produced when energy was applied to a combination of gases like those in Titan's atmosphere. Hörst also found amino acids, the building blocks of protein. She said it was the first time nucleotide bases and amino acids had been found in such an experiment without liquid water being present.

In April 2013, NASA reported that complex organic chemicals could arise on Titan based on studies simulating the atmosphere of Titan. In June 2013, polycyclic aromatic hydrocarbons (PAHs) were detected in the upper atmosphere of Titan.

A team of researchers led by Martin Rahm suggested in 2016 that polyimine could readily function as a building block in Titan's conditions. Titan's atmosphere produces significant quantities of hydrogen cyanide, which readily polymerize into forms which can capture light energy in Titan's surface conditions. As of yet, the answer to what happens with Titan's cyanide is unknown; while it is rich in the upper atmosphere where it is created, it is depleted at the surface, suggesting that there is some sort of reaction consuming it.

In July 2017, Cassini scientists positively identified the presence of carbon chain anions in Titan's upper atmosphere which appeared to be involved in the production of large complex organics. These highly reactive molecules were previously known to contribute to building complex organics in the Interstellar Medium, therefore highlighting a possibly universal stepping stone to producing complex organic material.

In July 2017, scientists reported that acrylonitrile (C_{2}H_{3}CN), a chemical possibly essential for life by being related to cell membrane and vesicle structure formation, had been found on Titan.

In October 2018, researchers reported low-temperature chemical pathways from simple organic compounds to complex polycyclic aromatic hydrocarbon (PAH) chemicals. Such chemical pathways may help explain the presence of PAHs in the low-temperature atmosphere of Titan, and may be significant pathways, in terms of the PAH world hypothesis, in producing precursors to biochemicals related to life as we know it.

== Hypotheses ==
=== Hydrocarbons as solvents ===
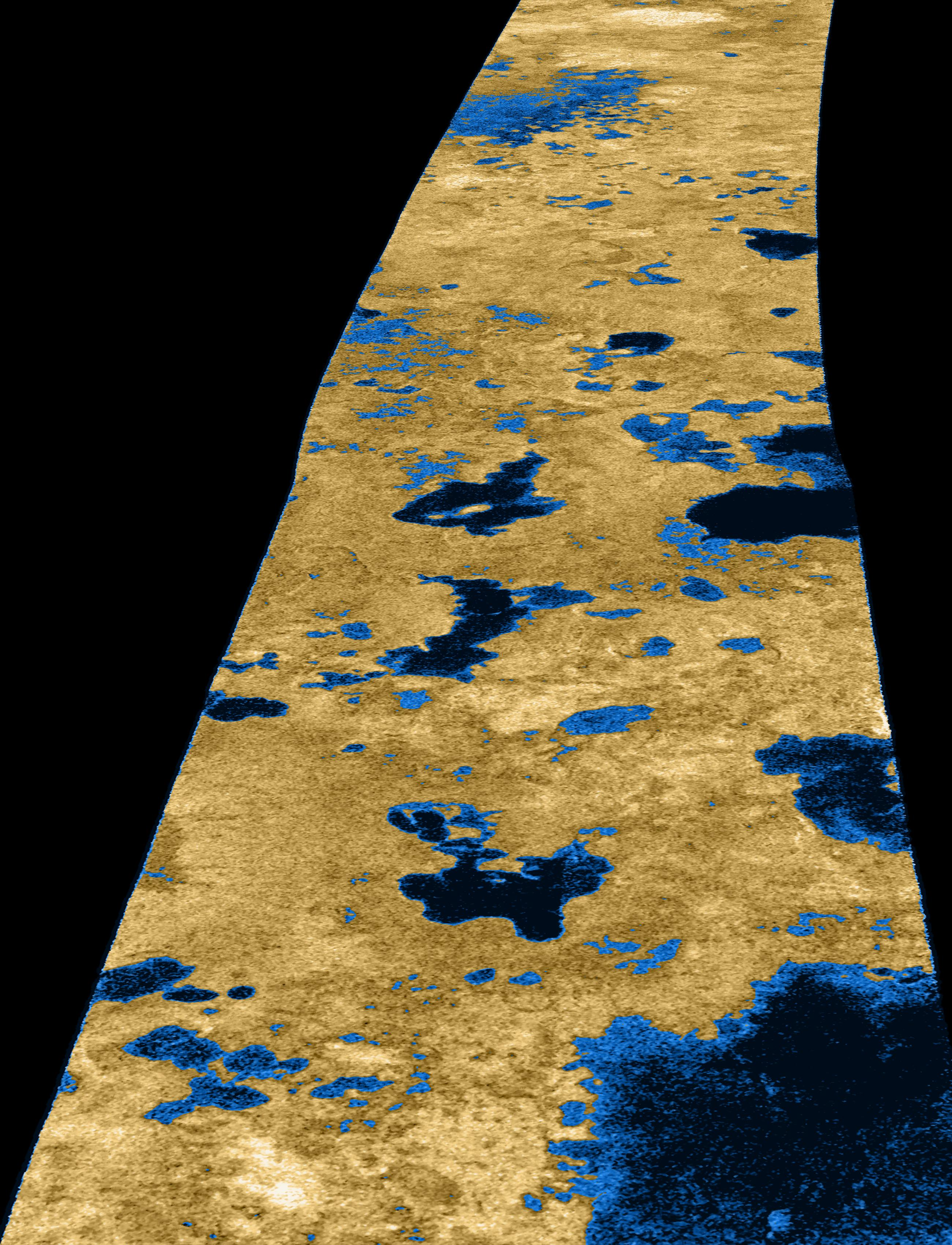
Hydrocarbon lakes on Titan. (False-color Cassini radar image from 2006)

Although all living things on Earth (including methanogens) use liquid water as a solvent, it is conceivable that life on Titan might instead use a liquid hydrocarbon, such as methane or ethane. Water is a stronger solvent than hydrocarbons; however, water is more chemically reactive, and can break down large organic molecules through hydrolysis. A life-form whose solvent was a hydrocarbon would not face the risk of its biomolecules being destroyed in this way.

Titan appears to have lakes of liquid ethane or liquid methane on its surface, as well as rivers and seas, which some scientific models suggest could support hypothetical non-water-based life. It has been speculated that life could exist in the liquid methane and ethane that form rivers and lakes on Titan's surface, just as organisms on Earth live in water. Such hypothetical creatures would take in H_{2} in place of O_{2}, react it with acetylene instead of glucose, and produce methane instead of carbon dioxide. By comparison, some methanogens on Earth obtain energy by reacting hydrogen with carbon dioxide, producing methane and water.

In 2005, astrobiologists Christopher McKay and Heather Smith predicted that if methanogenic life is consuming atmospheric hydrogen in sufficient volume, it will have a measurable effect on the mixing ratio in the troposphere of Titan. The effects predicted included a level of acetylene much lower than otherwise expected, as well as a reduction in the concentration of hydrogen itself.

Evidence consistent with these predictions was reported in June 2010 by Darrell Strobel of Johns Hopkins University, who analysed measurements of hydrogen concentration in the upper and lower atmosphere. Strobel found that the hydrogen concentration in the upper atmosphere is so much larger than near the surface that the physics of diffusion leads to hydrogen flowing downwards at a rate of roughly 10^{25} molecules per second. Near the surface the downward-flowing hydrogen apparently disappears. Another paper released the same month showed very low levels of acetylene on Titan's surface.

Chris McKay agreed with Strobel that presence of life, as suggested in McKay's 2005 article, is a possible explanation for the findings about hydrogen and acetylene, but also cautioned that other explanations are currently more likely: namely the possibility that the results are due to human error, to a meteorological process, or to the presence of some mineral catalyst enabling hydrogen and acetylene to react chemically. He noted that such a catalyst, one effective at −178 °C (95 K), is presently unknown and would in itself be a startling discovery, though less startling than discovery of an extraterrestrial life form.

The June 2010 findings gave rise to considerable media interest, including a report in the British newspaper, the Telegraph, which spoke of clues to the existence of "primitive aliens".

=== Cell membranes ===
A hypothetical cell membrane capable of functioning in liquid methane was modeled in February 2015. The proposed chemical base for these membranes is acrylonitrile, which has been detected on Titan. Called an "azotosome" ('nitrogen body'), formed from "azoto", Greek for nitrogen, and "soma", Greek for body, it lacks the phosphorus and oxygen found in phospholipids on Earth but contains nitrogen. Despite the very different chemical structure and external environment, its properties are surprisingly similar, including autoformation of sheets, flexibility, stability, and other properties.

According to computer simulation in 2020 by the Rahm group, azotosomes could not form under the conditions in Titan lakes due to thermodynamic barriers. In 2025, a new mechanism to overcome these barriers was proposed by astrobiologists Christian Mayer and Conor Nixon based on interaction between small mist droplets and the surface of methane lakes. However, a March 2026 study suggested that such azotosomes would be unstable, although it did not rule out temporary or transiently stable azotosomes. At present, azotosome formation remains speculative without laboratory demonstration of their existence.

An analysis of ALMA data, completed in 2017, confirmed substantial amounts of acrylonitrile in Titan's atmosphere.

=== Comparative habitability ===
In order to assess the likelihood of finding any sort of life on various planets and moons, Dirk Schulze-Makuch and other scientists have developed a planetary habitability index which takes into account factors including characteristics of the surface and atmosphere, availability of energy, solvents and organic compounds. Using this index, based on data available in late 2011, the model suggests that Titan has the highest current habitability rating of any known world, other than Earth.

=== Titan as a test case ===
While the Cassini–Huygens mission was not equipped to provide evidence for biosignatures or complex organics, it showed an environment on Titan that is similar, in some ways, to ones theorized for the primordial Earth. Scientists think that the atmosphere of early Earth was similar in composition to the current atmosphere on Titan, with the important exception of a lack of water vapor on Titan. Many hypotheses have developed that attempt to bridge the step from chemical to biological evolution.

Titan is presented as a test case for the relation between chemical reactivity and life, in a 2007 report on life's limiting conditions prepared by a committee of scientists under the United States National Research Council. The committee, chaired by John Baross, considered that "if life is an intrinsic property of chemical reactivity, life should exist on Titan. Indeed, for life not to exist on Titan, we would have to argue that life is not an intrinsic property of the reactivity of carbon-containing molecules under conditions where they are stable..."

David Grinspoon, one of the scientists who in 2005 proposed that hypothetical organisms on Titan might use hydrogen and acetylene as an energy source, has mentioned the Gaia hypothesis in the context of discussion about Titan life. He suggests that, just as Earth's environment and its organisms have evolved together, the same thing is likely to have happened on other worlds with life on them. In Grinspoon's view, worlds that are "geologically and meteorologically alive are much more likely to be biologically alive as well".

=== Panspermia or independent origin ===
An alternate explanation for life's hypothetical existence on Titan has been proposed: if life were to be found on Titan, it could have originated from Earth in a process called panspermia. It is theorized that large asteroid and cometary impacts on Earth's surface have caused hundreds of millions of fragments of microbe-laden rock to escape Earth's gravity. Calculations indicate that a number of these would encounter many of the bodies in the Solar System, including Titan. On the other hand, Jonathan Lunine has argued that any living things in Titan's cryogenic hydrocarbon lakes would need to be so different chemically from Earth life that it would not be possible for one to be the ancestor of the other. In Lunine's view, presence of organisms in Titan's lakes would mean a second, independent origin of life within the Solar System, implying that life has a high probability of emerging on habitable worlds throughout the cosmos.

== Planned and proposed missions ==
The proposed Titan Mare Explorer mission, a Discovery-class lander that would splash down in a lake, "would have the possibility of detecting life", according to astronomer Chris Impey of the University of Arizona.

The planned Dragonfly rotorcraft mission is intended to land on solid ground and relocate many times. Dragonfly will be New Frontiers program Mission #4. Its instruments will study how far prebiotic chemistry may have progressed. Dragonfly will carry equipment to study the chemical composition of Titan's surface, and to sample the lower atmosphere for possible biosignatures, including hydrogen concentrations.

== See also ==
- Lakes of Titan – Hydrocarbon lakes on Titan, a moon of Saturn
- Life on Mars – Assessments of possible life on Mars
- Life on Venus – Scientific assessments on the microbial habitability of Venus
