= Anti-greenhouse effect =

Atmospheric phenomenon causing planetary cooling

The anti-greenhouse effect is a natural phenomenon that occurs when radiant energy from a star (sun) is absorbed or scattered by the upper atmosphere of an orbiting (typically planetary-mass) celestial object, preventing that solar energy from reaching the latter's surface and resulting in a negative net heat transfer (i.e. cooling) to the surface – the opposite of a greenhouse effect. In an ideal case where the upper atmosphere absorbs all solar irradiance (heat gain) and is nearly transparent to infrared dissipation (heat loss) from the surface, the equilibrium temperature of the lower atmosphere (troposphere and stratosphere) would be reduced by 16%, which is a significant amount of surface cooling.

This anti-greenhouse effect has been discovered on Saturn's moon Titan. In Titan's stratosphere, a haze composed of organic tholin aerosols simultaneously absorbs sunlight and is nearly transparent to infrared dissipation from Titan's surface. The dynamic competition between surface warming from sunlight and surface cooling from infrared heat escape is marked by a thermodynamic equilibrium where the greenhouse effect warms Titan by 21 K while the anti-greenhouse effect cools Titan by 9 K, so the net warming is 12 K (= 21 K - 9 K).

It has been suggested that Earth potentially had a similar photochemical haze during the Archean eon, causing an anti-greenhouse effect that was counterbalanced by strong greenhouse effect from then-abundant atmospheric methane, and it is theorized that this haze helped to regulate and stabilize Earth's early climate on the backdrop of an evolving faint young Sun. This equilibrium was permanently disrupted at the end of the Archean by the Great Oxygenation Event, which removed most of the atmospheric methane and subsequently led to a 300-megaannum-long icehouse period known as the Huronian glaciation during the early Proterozoic eon, until global surface temperature finally re-stabilized to temperate levels during the Boring Billion. This equilibrium was disrupted again during the Cryogenian when a combination of reduced greenhouse effect due to the Neoproterozoic Oxygenation Event (which significantly reduced atmospheric carbon dioxide) and enhanced anti-greenhouse effect from volcanic sulfur aerosols led to another global ice age known as the Snowball Earth.

Other atmospheric phenomena besides tholin hazes can also act similarly to the anti-greenhouse effect, such as Earth's stratospheric ozone layer and thermosphere, ejecta particulates (especially sulfur dioxide and sulfates) from volcanic eruption plumes and impact events (which can cause volcanic winter and impact winter, respectively), nuclear fallouts (which can cause nuclear winter), and dust in Mars's upper atmosphere. Outside of the Solar System, calculations of the impact of these hazes on the thermal structure of exoplanets have also been conducted.

== Energy balance theory ==
=== Energy balance ===
Energy flows on Titan lead to both a greenhouse effect and an anti-greenhouse effect.

To understand how the anti-greenhouse effect impacts a planet or large moon with its host star as an external source of energy, an energy budget can be calculated, similar to how it is done for Earth. For each component in the system, incoming energy needs to equal outgoing energy to uphold the conservation of energy and remain at a constant temperature. If one energy contributor is larger than the other, there is an energy imbalance and the temperature of an object will change to reestablish a balance. Energy sources across the whole electromagnetic spectrum need to be accounted for when calculating the energy balance. In the case of Earth, for example, a balance is struck between incoming shortwave radiation from the Sun and outgoing longwave radiation from the surface and the atmosphere. After establishing a component's energy balance, a temperature can be derived.

=== Ideal anti-greenhouse effect ===
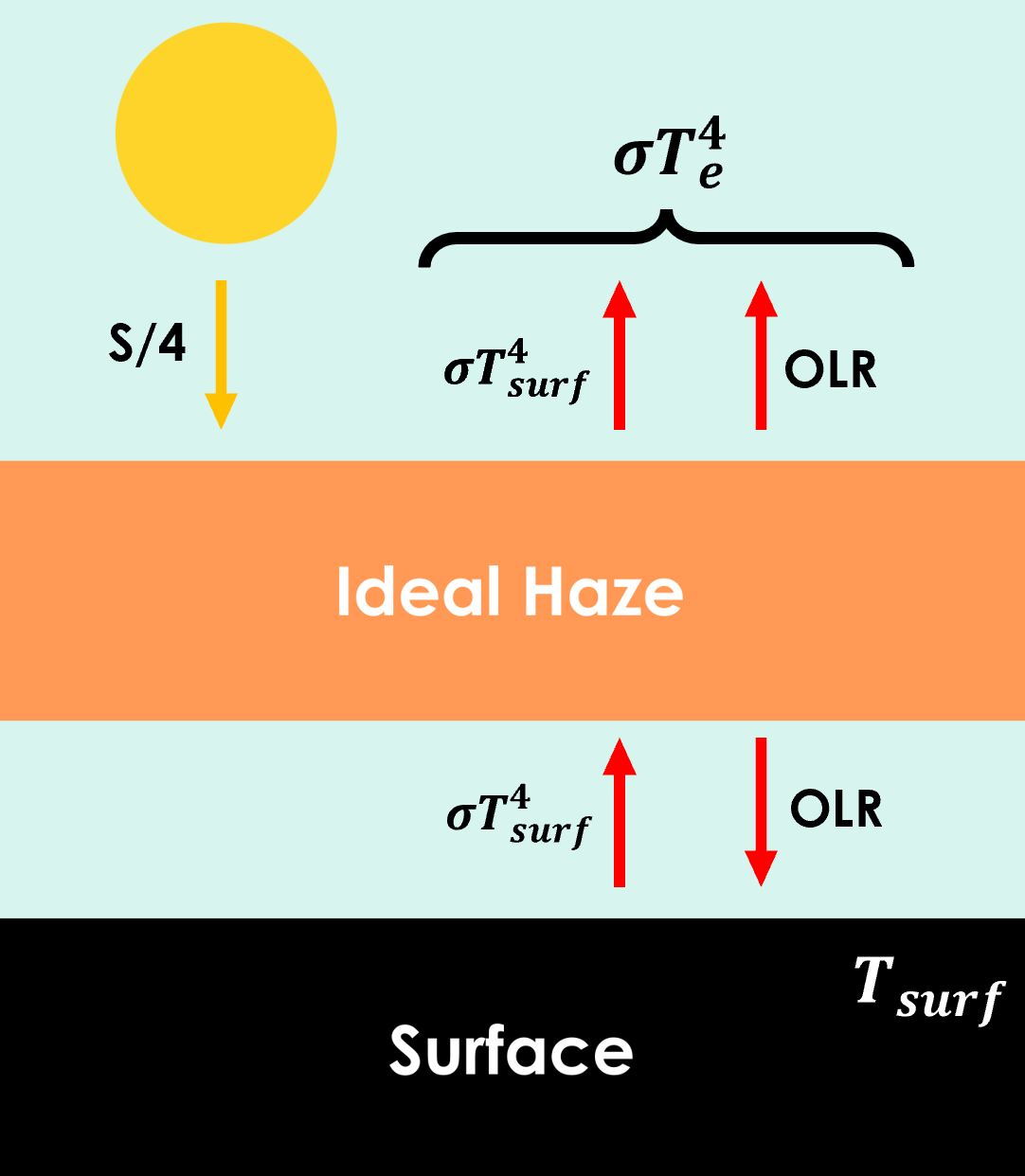
Ideal anti-greenhouse effect energy balance assuming one upper atmosphere layer and a planetary albedo of 0. See text for an explanation of symbols and abbreviations.

In the most extreme case, suppose that a planet's upper atmosphere contained a haze that absorbed all sunlight which was not reflected back to space, but at the same time was nearly transparent to infrared longwave radiation. By Kirchhoff's law, since the haze is not a good absorber of infrared radiation, the haze will also not be a good emitter of infrared radiation and will emit a small amount in this part of the spectrum both out to space and towards the planet's surface. By the Stefan–Boltzmann law, the planet emits energy directly proportional to the fourth power of surface temperature. At the surface, the energy balance is as follows,

$\sigma T_{surf}^4 = OLR$

where $\sigma$ is the Stefan–Boltzmann constant, $T_{surf}$ is the surface temperature, and $OLR$ is the outgoing longwave radiation from the haze in the upper atmosphere. Since the haze is not a good absorber of this longwave radiation, it can be assumed to all pass throughout to space. The incoming solar energy must be scaled down to account for the amount of energy that is lost by being reflected to space since it is not within the planet-atmosphere system. In the upper atmosphere, the energy balance is as follows,

$\frac{S}{4} (1-\alpha) \equiv \sigma T_{e}^4 = OLR + \sigma T_{surf}^4$

where $S$ is the incoming solar energy flux, $\alpha$ is planetary albedo (i.e., reflectivity), and $T_e$ is the effective mean radiating temperature. The incoming solar flux is divided by four to account for time and spatial averaging over the entire planet and the $1 - \alpha$ factor is the fraction of the solar energy that is absorbed by the haze. Replacing $OLR$ with $\sigma$$T_{surf}^4$ in the second equation, we have,

$\sigma T_{e}^4 = 2\sigma T_{surf}^4$

and the ratio $T_{surf}/T_e$ equals $\left ( 0.5 \right )^{1/4}$ or 0.84. This means that the surface temperature is reduced from the effective mean radiating temperature by 16%, which is a potentially significant cooling effect. This is an ideal case and represents the maximum impact the anti-greenhouse effect can have and will not be the impact for a real planet or large moon.

=== Outdated concept of anti-greenhouse effect ===
Earlier discussions in the scientific community pre-dating the current definition established by Dr. Christopher McKay in 1991 referred to the anti-greenhouse effect as a precursor to the Late Precambrian glaciation, describing it more as a carbon sequestration process. This is no longer the current usage of the term, which emphasizes surface cooling due to high-altitude absorption of solar radiation.

=== Comparison to negative greenhouse effect ===
The negative greenhouse effect is a phenomenon that can produce localized, rather than planetary, cooling. Whereas the anti-greenhouse effect involves an overall temperature inversion in the stratosphere, the negative greenhouse effect involves a localized temperature inversion in the troposphere. Both effects increase outgoing thermal emissions—locally in the case of a negative greenhouse effect and globally in the case of the anti-greenhouse effect.

== On Titan ==
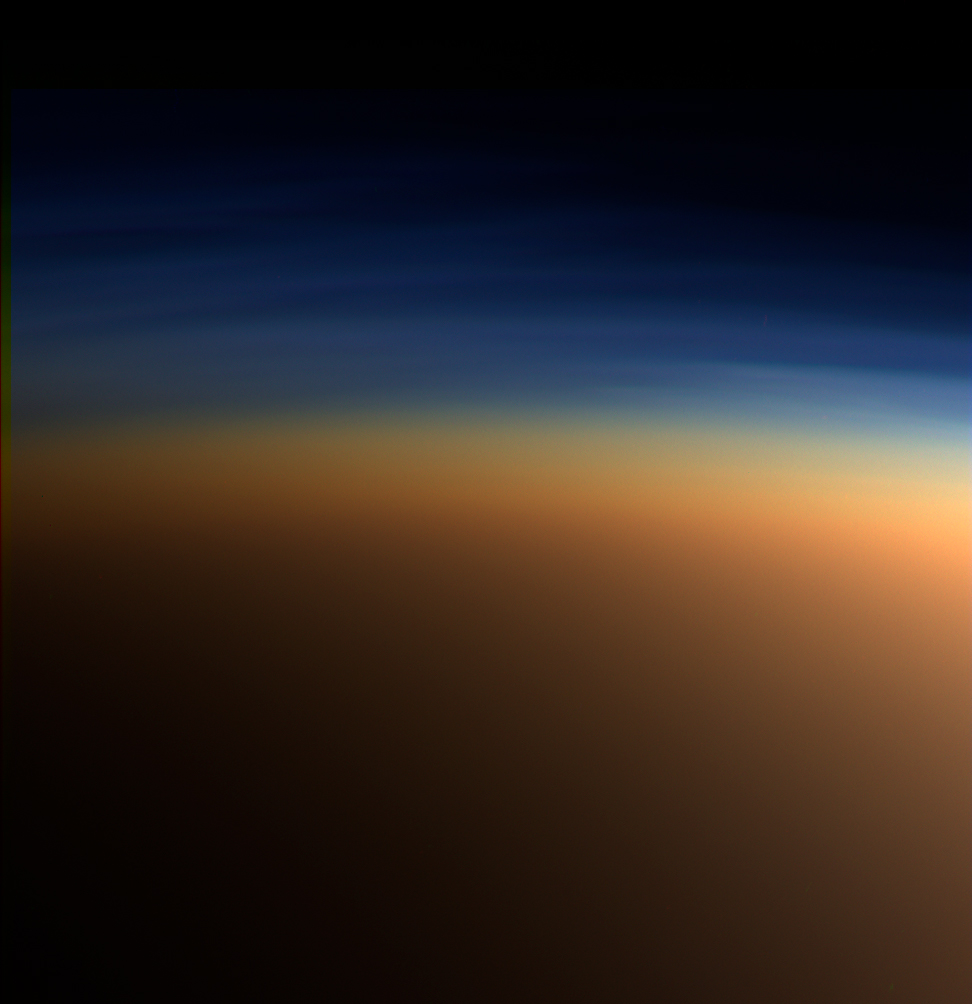
The "haze" on Titan

The organic haze in Titan's stratosphere absorbs 90% of the solar radiation reaching Titan, but is inefficient at trapping infrared radiation generated by the surface. This is due to Titan's atmospheric window occurring from roughly 16.5 to 25 micrometers. Although a large greenhouse effect does keep Titan at a much higher temperature than the thermal equilibrium, the anti-greenhouse effect due to the haze reduces the surface temperature by 9 K. Because the greenhouse effect due to other atmospheric components increases it by 21 K, the net effect is that the real surface temperature of Titan (94 K) is 12 K warmer than the effective temperature 82 K (which would be the surface temperature in the absence of any atmosphere, assuming constant albedo). In the ideal anti-greenhouse case described above, the maximum impact of the organic haze on Titan is (1-0.84) $\times$ 82 K = 13 K. This is higher than the 9 K found on Titan.

The organic haze is formed through the polymerization of methane photolysis products and nitriles, meaning the products combine into longer chains and bigger molecules. These methane-derived polymers can be made of polycyclic aromatic hydrocarbons (PAHs) and polyacetylene. The distribution of these polymers is not vertically uniform in Titan's atmosphere, however. The nitrile and polyacetylene polymers are formed in the upper atmosphere while the PAH polymers are created in the stratosphere. These polymers then aggregate to form haze particles. The opacity to sunlight of this organic haze on Titan is determined primarily by the haze production rate. If haze production increases, opacity of the haze increases, resulting in more cooling of the surface temperature. Additionally, the presence of this organic haze is the cause of the temperature inversion in Titan's stratosphere.

== On Earth ==
=== Past ===
The presence of an organic tholin haze in Earth's Archean secondary atmosphere was first suggested in 1983 and could have been responsible for an anti-greenhouse effect. This hypothesis stems from attempts at resolving the faint young Sun paradox, where a lower solar output from the early Sun must be reconciled with the existence of liquid surface water on Earth (which was a completely ocean planet with few landmasses) at that time. In order to explain how water could remain in liquid form, it has been proposed that powerful greenhouse gases such as atmospheric methane (which has a global warming potential 84 times greater than carbon dioxide) helped keep Earth's surface warm enough to prevent water from completely freezing. While one hypothesis suggests that only CO_{2} was responsible for the additional warmth, another hypothesis includes the presence of both CO_{2} and CH_{4}. One model found that methane in the postbiotic Archean could have existed at a mixing ratio of 1,000 ppm or higher, while the carbon dioxide could be as low as 5,000 ppm to still prevent Earth from freezing over, about 12 times the amount in 2022. However, at this 0.2 ratio of methane to carbon dioxide, products deriving from methane photolysis can polymerize to form long-chain molecules that aggregate into tholin particles, creating the anti-greenhouse organic haze.

The anti-greenhouse haze is formed when the CH_{4}/CO_{2} ratio exceeds roughly 0.1. It is posited that the organic haze allowed the creation of a negative feedback loop that stabilized the climate on Archean Earth against runaway greenhouse effects. If temperatures increased in Archean Earth, methane production would increase due to methanogens' possible preference for warmer temperatures (see thermophiles). Increasing temperatures would also increase carbon dioxide removal through basalt and silicate weathering (i.e. mineral carbonation) due to an assumed increase in precipitation, leading to erosion of the lithosphere and increased inorganic carbon sequestration. This would lead to an increased CH_{4}/CO_{2} ratio favoring more production of tholin haze. This increase in haze production would lead to increased opacity and albedo of the atmosphere to sunlight, decreasing the amounts of solar energy reaching the surface, and thus decreasing surface temperature, which in turn negated the initial increase in surface temperature. One estimation of the anti-greenhouse effect on Archean Earth calculated the impact to be up to about 20 K in surface cooling.

=== Present ===
In Earth's modern atmosphere, there are no longer any organic hazes in the upper atmosphere due to successive oxygenation events having removed most of the atmospheric methane, which is needed to create tholin. There are, however, still a few sources of an anti-greenhouse effect. It has been suggested that stratospheric ozone layer (which formed during Neoproterozoic) and thermosphere create a partial anti-greenhouse effect due to their low thermal opacity and high temperatures. Additionally, aerosilized ejectae like plume from volcanoes and fallout after an open-air nuclear test has been suggested to typify an anti-greenhouse effect. Also, the formation of stratospheric sulfur aerosols from sulfur dioxide-containing volcanic gas emissions has also been seen to have a cooling effect on Earth, which lasts approximately 1 to 2 years. All of these sources act to create an atmospheric temperature stratification where a hot upper layer lies above colder lower layers, which typifies the anti-greenhouse effect.

== On other planets ==
There has been discussion about a weak anti-greenhouse effect on Mars, where dust storms carry significant amount of opaque particulates into the upper atmosphere. Evidence for this effect came from Viking 1 measurements made in 1976–77 when in the aftermath of a global storm, the average daytime temperature above the ground dropped by 5 K.

Studies using computer simulations have investigated the impact of photochemical hazes on other exoplanets' thermal structure. Applying this model to hot Jupiters, scientists found that the inclusion of haze for HD 189733 b led to an expansion of the atmosphere, helping to explain an observed steep transit signature in the electromagnetic spectrum. Also, the model for HD 209458 b predicted both photochemical haze and objects like clouds.
