= Colonization of Titan =

Proposed concepts for the human colonization of Titan

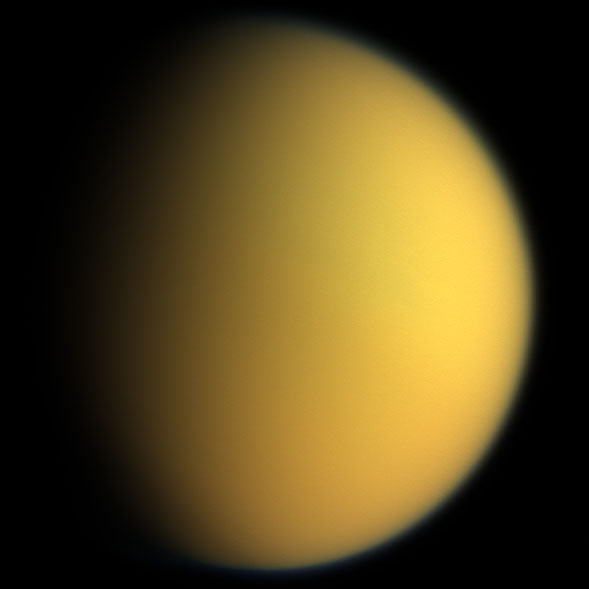
Saturn's moon Titan in natural color

Saturn's largest moon Titan is one of several candidates for possible future colonization of the outer Solar System, though protection against extreme cold is a major consideration.

According to Cassini data from 2008, Titan has hundreds of times more liquid hydrocarbons than all the known oil and natural gas reserves on Earth. These hydrocarbons rain from the sky and collect in vast deposits that form lakes and dunes. "Titan is just covered in carbon-bearing material—it's a Mega factory of organic chemicals", said Ralph Lorenz, who leads the study of Titan based on radar data from Cassini. "This vast carbon inventory is an important look into the geology and climate history of Titan." Several hundred lakes and seas have been observed, with several dozen estimated to contain more hydrocarbon liquid than Earth's oil and gas reserves. The dark dunes that run along the equator contain a volume of organics several hundred times larger than Earth's coal reserves.

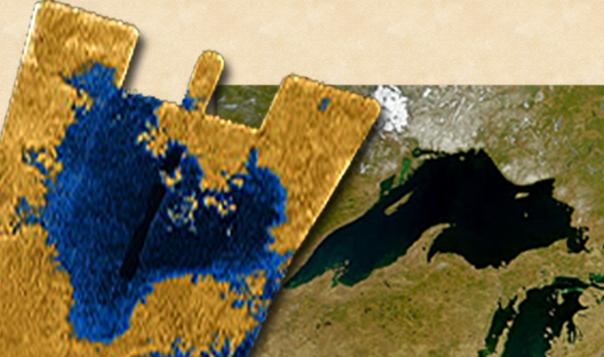
Titan 'sea' (left) compared at scale to Lake Superior (right)

Radar images obtained on July 21, 2006, appear to show lakes of liquid hydrocarbon (such as methane and ethane) in Titan's northern latitudes. This is the first discovery of currently existing lakes beyond Earth. The lakes range in size from about a kilometer in width to one hundred kilometers across.

On March 13, 2007, the Jet Propulsion Laboratory announced that it found strong evidence of seas of methane and ethane in the northern hemisphere. At least one of these is larger than any of the Great Lakes in North America.

== Suitability ==
The American aerospace engineer and author Robert Zubrin identified Saturn as the most important and valuable of the four gas giants in the Solar System, because of its relative proximity, low radiation, and excellent system of moons. He also named Titan as the most important moon on which to establish a base to develop the resources of the Saturn system.

== Habitability ==
Robert Zubrin has pointed out that Titan possesses an abundance of all the elements necessary to support life, saying "In certain ways, Titan is the most hospitable extraterrestrial world within our solar system for human colonization." The atmosphere contains plentiful nitrogen and methane. Additionally, strong evidence indicates that liquid methane exists on the surface. Evidence also indicates the presence of liquid water and ammonia under the surface, which are delivered to the surface by volcanic activity. While this water can be used to generate breathable oxygen, more is blown into Titan's atmosphere from the geysers on the icy moon of Enceladus (also a moon of Saturn), as they start as water molecules and evolve into oxygen and hydrogen. Nitrogen is ideal to add buffer gas partial pressure to breathable air (it forms about 78% of Earth's atmosphere). Nitrogen, methane and ammonia can all be used to produce fertilizer for growing food.

== Gravity ==
Titan has a surface gravity of 0.138 g, slightly less than the Moon. Managing long-term effects of low gravity on human health would therefore be a significant issue for long-term occupation of Titan, more so than on Mars. These effects are still an active field of study. They can include symptoms such as loss of bone density, loss of muscle density, and a weakened immune system. Astronauts in Earth orbit have remained in microgravity for up to a year or more at a time. Effective countermeasures for the negative effects of low gravity are well-established, particularly an aggressive regimen of daily physical exercise or weighted clothing. The variation in the negative effects of low gravity as a function of different levels of low gravity are not known, since all research in this area is restricted to humans in zero gravity. The same goes for the potential effects of low gravity on fetal and pediatric development. It has been hypothesized that children born and raised in low gravity such as on Titan would not be well adapted for life under the higher gravity of Earth.

== In situ energy resources ==
Energy resources include chemical, nuclear, wind, and hydropower (presumably using methane instead of water). Electrical power could be produced using chemical power plants adding hydrogen to acetylene (i.e. hydrogenation; oxygen is not freely available), or turbines in large methane seas such as Kraken Mare where the tidal pull of Saturn causes up to a meter of tidal change each Titan day.

== Flight ==
The very high ratio of atmospheric density to surface gravity also greatly reduces the wingspan needed for an aircraft to maintain lift, so much so that a human would be able to strap on wings and easily fly through Titan's atmosphere while wearing a sort of spacesuit that could be manufactured with today's technology. Another theoretically possible means to become airborne on Titan would be to use a hot air balloon-like vehicle filled with an Earth-like atmosphere at Earth-like temperatures (because oxygen is only slightly denser than nitrogen, the atmosphere in a habitat on Titan would be about one third as dense as the surrounding atmosphere), although such a vehicle would need a skin able to keep the extreme cold out in spite of the light weight required. Due to Titan's extremely low temperatures, heating of any flight-bound vehicle becomes a key obstacle.

== See also ==
- Titan in fiction
