= List of spacecraft powered by non-rechargeable batteries =

This is a list of spacecraft powered by non-rechargeable batteries. While most spacecraft are powered by longer-lasting power sources such as solar cells or radioisotope thermoelectric generators, which can provide power for years to decades, some have been powered by primary (non-rechargeable) electrochemical cells, which provide runtimes of minutes to months. This is typically done only on spacecraft that are planned to operate for only a short time, even if they must travel for a long time before being activated. Some spacecraft classes where this applies are atmospheric probes, short-duration landers, and technology demonstrators. Some early Earth satellites, such as the first Sputnik and Explorer satellites, also used primary batteries, before solar panels were widely adopted.

== Uncrewed ==
Examples with non-rechargeable battery power only
Year (Note: Year of battery-powered operation, if later than launch year)	Spacecraft	Role	Battery life (Note: From either launch or start of battery-powered operation to end of mission due to either battery failure or another cause. If the mission ended due to a cause other than battery failure, battery life is given as ">" (greater than) because the battery could have lasted longer.)	Type of battery	Parent	Notes
1999	Deep Space 2	Scientific landers (2)	1–3 days (planned)	Lithium–thionyl chloride	Mars Polar Lander	Impact landers for Mars, lost during EDL
2016	ExoMars Schiaparelli	Technology demonstration lander	2–8 Martian sols (planned)		ExoMars Trace Gas Orbiter	Lander for Mars, lost during EDL but considered a successful demo
1958	Explorer 1	Scientific satellite	111 days (actual)	Zinc–mercury oxide (Zn–HgO)		Earth/space science
1960	Explorer 8	Scientific satellite	54 days (actual)	Mercury		Earth science: ionospheric properties and micrometeorites
1966	Explorer 17 (AE-A)	Scientific satellite	98 days (actual)			Earth science: upper atmospheric properties
1995	Galileo Probe	Scientific atmospheric probe	>57 or 78 minutes after entry (actual, due to overheating) ≥61.4 minutes after entry, 6 hours after waking up (planned)	Lithium–sulfur dioxide Ca/CaCrO4 thermal (to fire pyrotechnics)	Galileo	Atmospheric entry into Jupiter
2004 (Note: Launched 1997)	Huygens	Scientific atmospheric probe	153 minutes or ≤3 hours (planned)	Lithium–sulfur dioxide	Cassini	Landed on Saturn's moon Titan
1959	Luna 1	Scientific lunar impactor (planned); scientific lunar flyby probe (actual)	(closest lunar approach was 34 hours after launch)	Silver–zinc, mercury oxide		Intended to crash into the Moon but missed. Performed lunar flyby instead. Now derelict in heliocentric orbit
1959	Luna 2	Scientific lunar impactor	>1 day, 14 hours, 22 minutes, 42 seconds (actual, from launch to impact)			Succeeded in impacting the Moon, where Luna 1 had failed
1966	Luna 10	Scientific lunar orbiter	219 transmissions over 460 orbits (actual)			Studied radiation, fields, particles, meteorites, gravity
1966	Luna 11	Scientific lunar orbiter	137 transmissions over 277 orbits (actual)			Lunar orbit
1976	Luna 24	Scientific lunar lander with sample return				
2018	MASCOT	Scientific rover	>17 hours (actual) <17 hours (planned)		Hayabusa2	Hopping rover that landed on asteroid 162173 Ryugu
2022	Lunar Excursion Vehicle (LEV-1)	Technology demonstration	1-14 days (planned)			Lunar surface rover, demonstration of crewed lunar vehicle's wheels
1972	Mars 2 and 3 landers	Scientific landers with tethered rovers (1 each)			Mars 2 and 3 orbiters	Rovers were ski walking type and were not deployed due to lander failures
1961	Mercury-Scout 1	Technical satellite	18.5 hours (planned)			Launch failure
1959	Pioneer 4	Scientific lunar flyby probe	3 days, 10 hours	Mercury		Derelict in heliocentric orbit
1978	Pioneer Venus Multiprobe	Scientific atmospheric probes (1 large, 3 small)	>54 minutes (Large Probe actual) >53 minutes (North Probe actual) 123 minutes (Day Probe actual) >56 minutes (Night Probe actual)	Silver–zinc (AgZn)	Pioneer Venus Bus	Atmospheric entry into Venus. Day Probe survived impact and presumably died due to battery exhaustion. There was also a solar-powered bus that entered the atmosphere along with the probes
1989	Phobos Hopper (Prop-F)	Scientific lander	3 hours (planned)		Phobos 2	Hopping lander for Phobos. Phobos 2 was lost en route to Phobos due to computer failure
1957	Sputnik	Technology demonstration satellite	22 days/326 orbits (actual)	Silver–zinc (AgZn)		Earth satellite
2006	SuitSat-1	Technical/commemorative satellite	between 2 orbits/~3 hours and 15 days (actual)		ISS	Earth satellite
1966–1969	Venera atmospheric probes	Scientific atmospheric probes	>53 minutes (Venera 5 actual) >51 minutes (Venera 6 actual)			Veneras 3–6 were atmospheric probes. Venera 3 failed upon entry. Venera 4 failed during descent due to overpressure. Veneras 5 and 6 were originally planned as landers, but changed to atmospheric probes due to learning about Venus's atmospheric pressure. Their parachutes were shrunk to increase descent speed, so as to reach crush depth before battery exhaustion
1970, 1972	Venera 7 and 8 landers	Scientific landers	58 minutes total (Venera 7 actual) (Note: Venera 7 separated from its bus after atmospheric entry, at an altitude of 60 km. The parachute failed during descent, and the lander was knocked onto its side upon landing. This caused the radio link geometry to be suboptimal, reducing received signal strength and the duration a given received signal strength could be maintained. It was a few weeks after the landing that it was discovered from analyzing recordings of the received signal that the lander had kept transmitting after landing, but the signal was received too weakly to discern at first.)50 minutes after landing (Venera 8 actual, until failure due to environmental conditions) greater than up to 127 minutes (actual)		Venera 8–14 buses	Most Venera landers' relay craft passed out of radio link range/geometry before the landers overheated or ran out of battery energy, rather than data return duration being limited by overheating as is commonly believed
1975–1982	Venera 9 to 14 landers	Scientific landers	>53 minutes after landing (Venera 9 actual) >65 minutes after landing (Venera 10 actual) >95 minutes after landing (Venera 11 actual) >110 minutes after landing (Venera 12 actual) >127 minutes after landing (Venera 13 actual) >57 minutes after landing (Venera 14 actual) 30 minutes after landing (Venera 9–12 planned) 32 minutes after landing (Venera 13 and 14 planned)		Venera 8–14 buses	Most Venera landers' relay craft passed out of radio link range/geometry before the landers overheated or ran out of battery energy, rather than data return duration being limited by overheating as is commonly believed
1985	Vega 1 and 2 landers	Scientific landers			Vega 1 and 2 buses	
1985	Vega 1 and 2 balloons	Scientific balloon aerobots	48–52 hours (expected)	Lithium	Vega 1 and 2 buses	
2022	Sora-Q Transformable Lunar Robot	Lunar rover	Two hours	Lithium	Hakuto-R Mission 1 lander	Lost with Hakuto-R's failed landing.
2024	Sora-Q Transformable Lunar Robot	Lunar rover	Two hours	Lithium	SLIM	Imaged SLIM.
2019, 2020, 2021, 2024	Deployable camera, EagleCam	Cameras	<1 day		Tianwen-1, Hayabusa2, IM-1	Imaging main spacecraft.

Examples with a supplementary power
What	Parent	Type of Battery	Secondary	Notes
Luna 9			Solar	Lunar landing (1966)
Sojourner rover	Mars Pathfinder	Lithium-thionyl chloride (LiSOCL2)	Solar	Roved Mars (1997)
Sputnik 3	-	Silver-Zinc	Solar (Experiment)	Earth satellite
Philae	Rosetta	Lithium-thionyl chloride (LiSOCl2) (900 W*h); Lithium-ion (Li-ion) (100 W*h)	Solar	Comet 67P/Churyumov–Gerasimenko (2014)
Vanguard 1		Mercury		Earth satellite (1958)

Primary power comes from a chemical battery, but a secondary system exists. For example, Luna 9 ran out of power after three days.

== Crewed ==
- Early Gemini with on silver-zinc (Ag-Zn), later hydrogen-oxygen fuel cells
- Mercury
- Apollo Lunar Module, Ag-Zn
- Soyuz 7K-T
- Vostok
- Voskhod

== See also ==
- Lists of spacecraft
- Solar panels on spacecraft
- List of passive satellites
- Batteries in space
