= Pioneer Venus Multiprobe =

NASA atmospheric mission to Venus (1978)

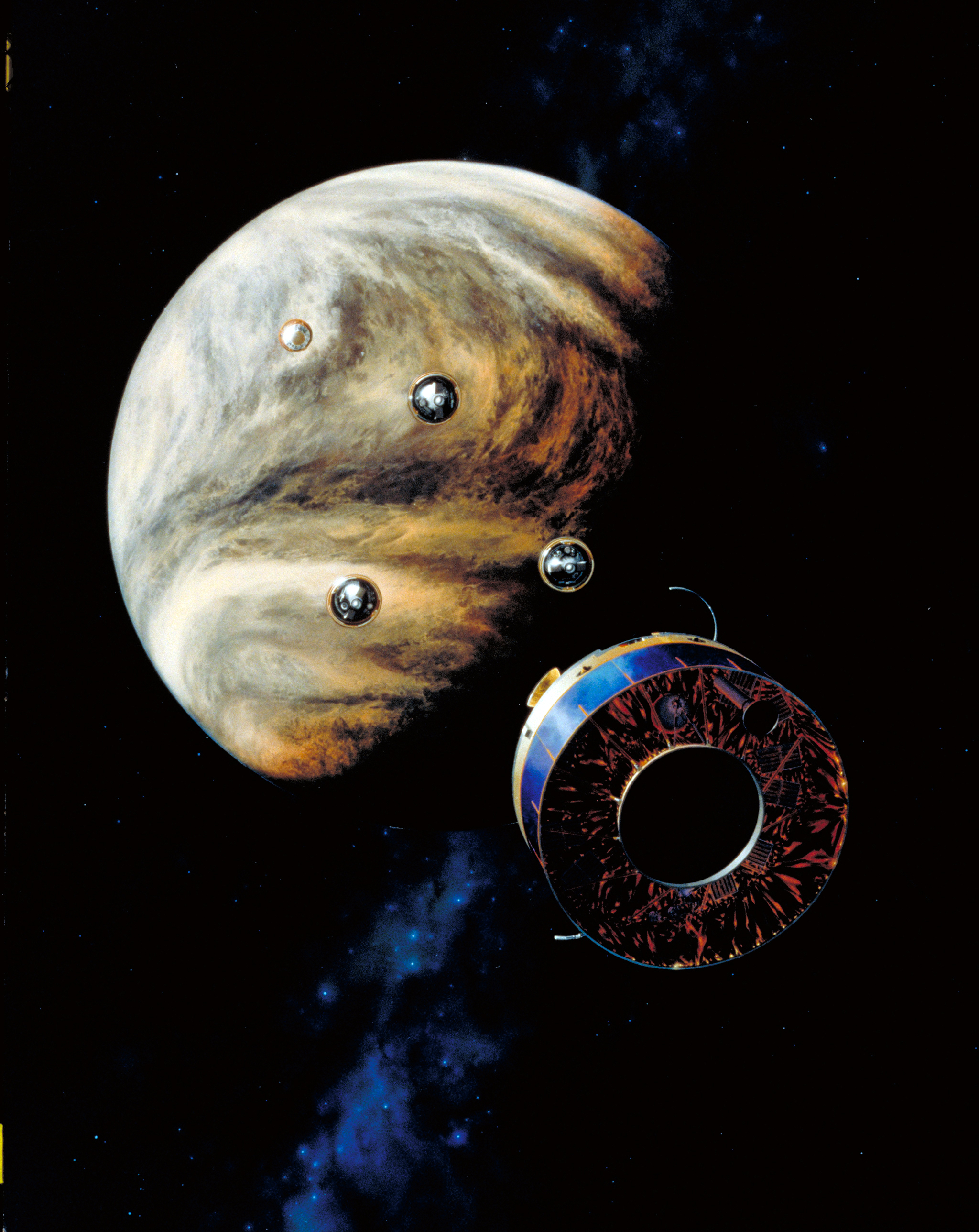
- Artist's impression of the five components of Pioneer 13 approaching Venus
- Names: Pioneer Venus 2 Pioneer 13
- Mission type: Venus atmospheric probes
- Operator: NASA / Ames
- COSPAR ID: 1978-078A
- SATCAT no.: 11001
- Website: science.nasa.gov
- Mission duration: 4 months and 1 day

Spacecraft properties
- Bus: HS-507
- Manufacturer: Hughes
- Launch mass: 904 kg (1,993 lb)
- Dry mass: 290 kg (640 lb) (bus); 315 kg (694 lb) (large probe); 3 x 90 kg (200 lb) (small probes)
- Power: 241 W

Start of mission
- Launch date: August 8, 1978, 07:33 UTC
- Rocket: Atlas SLV-3D Centaur-D1AR (AC-51)
- Launch site: Cape Canaveral LC-36A

End of mission
- Last contact: December 9, 1978, 20:22:55 UTC (main bus); December 9, 1978, 20:55:34 UTC (Day probe)

Orbital parameters
- Reference system: Heliocentric
- Semi-major axis: 0.9 astronomical units (130,000,000 km; 84,000,000 mi)
- Eccentricity: 0.19
- Perihelion altitude: 0.69 astronomical units (103,000,000 km; 64,000,000 mi)
- Aphelion altitude: 1.01 astronomical units (151,000,000 km; 94,000,000 mi)
- Inclination: 2.3 degrees
- Period: 284.0 days

Venus atmospheric probe
- Spacecraft component: Large Probe
- Atmospheric entry: December 9, 1978, 18:45:32 UTC
- Impact date: 19:39:53 UTC
- Impact site: 4.4°N 304.0°E

Venus atmospheric probe
- Spacecraft component: North Probe
- Atmospheric entry: December 9, 1978, 18:49:40 UTC
- Impact date: 19:42:40 UTC
- Impact site: 59.3°N 4.8°E

Venus atmospheric probe
- Spacecraft component: Day Probe
- Atmospheric entry: December 9, 1978, 18:52:18 UTC
- Impact date: 19:47:59 UTC
- Impact site: 31.3°S 317.0°E

Venus atmospheric probe
- Spacecraft component: Night Probe
- Atmospheric entry: December 9, 1978, 18:56:13 UTC
- Impact date: 19:52:05 UTC
- Impact site: 28.7°S 56.7°E

Venus atmospheric probe
- Spacecraft component: Main bus
- Atmospheric entry: December 9, 1978, 20:21:52 UTC

The Pioneer Venus Multiprobe, also known as Pioneer Venus 2 or Pioneer 13, was a spacecraft launched in 1978 to explore Venus as part of NASA's Pioneer program. This part of the program included a spacecraft bus which was launched from Earth. The bus carried one large and three smaller probes, which, after separating, each penetrated the Venusian atmosphere at a different location, returning data as they descended into the planet's thick atmosphere. The entries occurred on December 9, 1978.

== In context ==
There was also an orbiter launched in 1978, part of the overall Pioneer Venus project along with this entry probe mission. Whereas the probes entered the atmosphere in 1978, the Pioneer Venus Orbiter would stay in orbit throughout the 1980s and the early 1990s. The next major mission was the Magellan spacecraft, which was an orbiter capable of mapping Venus by seeing through its opaque clouds with radar.

== Spacecraft ==
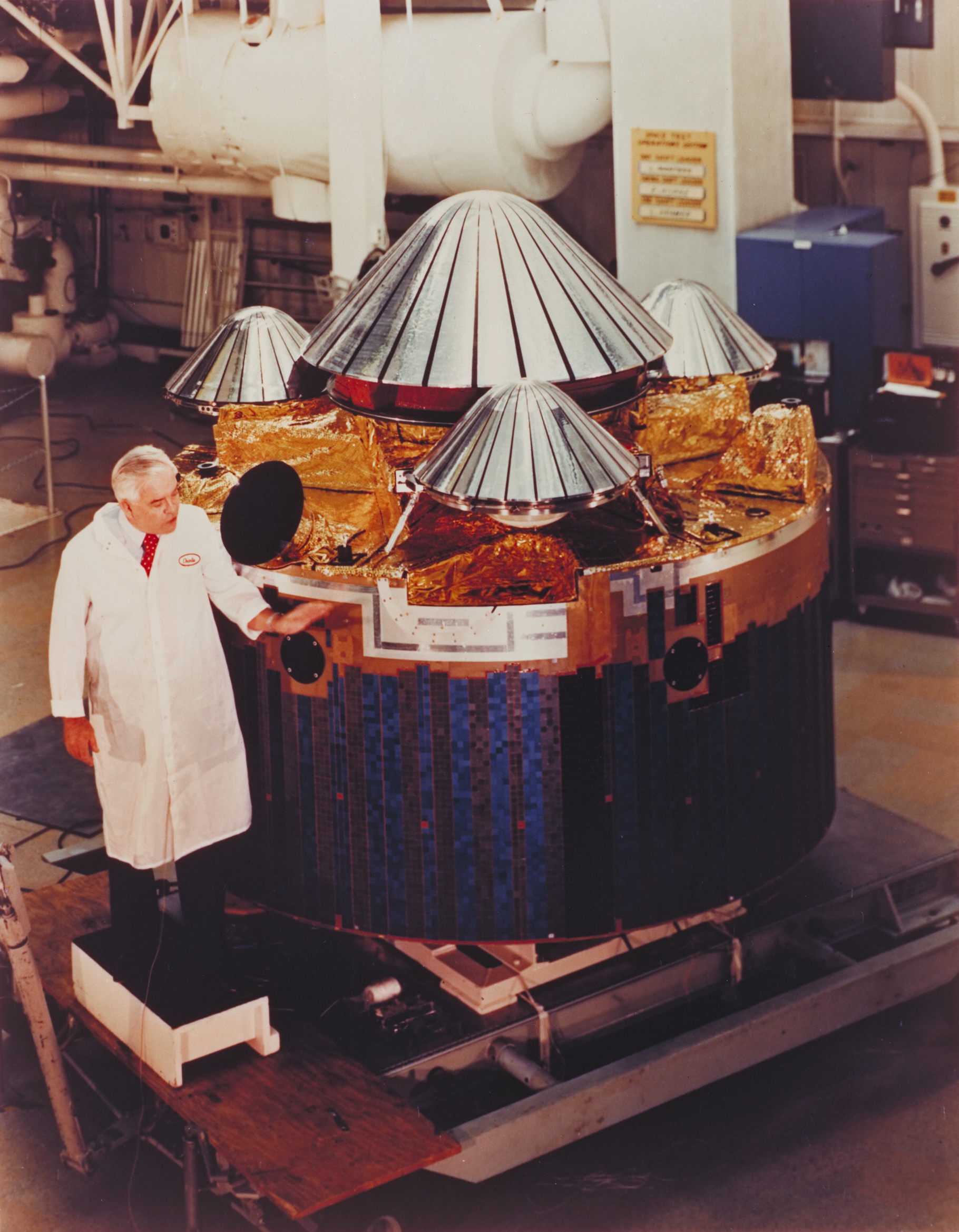
Pioneer Venus Bus with probes attached

The Pioneer Venus Multiprobe bus was constructed by the Hughes Aircraft Company, built around the HS-507 bus. It was cylindrical in shape, with a diameter of 2.5 meters (8 ft 2 in) and a mass of 290 kilograms (640 lb). Unlike the probes, which did not begin making direct measurements until they had decelerated lower in the atmosphere, the bus returned data on Venus's upper atmosphere.

The bus was targeted to enter the Venusian atmosphere at a shallow entry angle and transmit data until destruction by the heat of atmospheric friction. The objective was to study the structure and composition of the atmosphere down to the surface, the nature and composition of the clouds, the radiation field and energy exchange in the lower atmosphere, and local information on atmospheric circulation patterns. With no heat shield or parachute, the bus made upper atmospheric measurements with two instruments:

- BIMS – an ion mass spectrometer to determine the origin and long-term development of the Venusian atmosphere, the dynamics of the upper atmosphere layers, its energy balance and the effect of solar radiation and interplanetary space on those layers. This instrument had a range of 1 to 46 u, used 6 W of power and weighed 5 kilograms (11 lb).
- BNMS – a neutral mass spectrometer. This made measurements of the interaction between the solar wind and Venus, the photochemistry of the upper layers of and heat distribution in the Venusian atmosphere. It had a range of 1 to 60 u, weighed 1 kilogram (2.2 lb), and used ~1 W of power.

The spacecraft operated down to an altitude of about 110 kilometres (68 mi) before disintegrating.

== Probes ==
The spacecraft carried one large and three small atmospheric probes, designed by Senior Scientist and Program Manager Irwin Baker of Hughes Aircraft Company, to collect data as they descended into the atmosphere of Venus. The probes did not carry photographic instruments, and were not designed to survive landing—the smaller probes were not equipped with parachutes, and the larger probe's parachute was expected to detach as it neared the ground. All four probes continued transmitting data until impact; however, one survived and continued to transmit data from the surface, and another transmitted for 2 seconds after landing.

=== Large probe ===
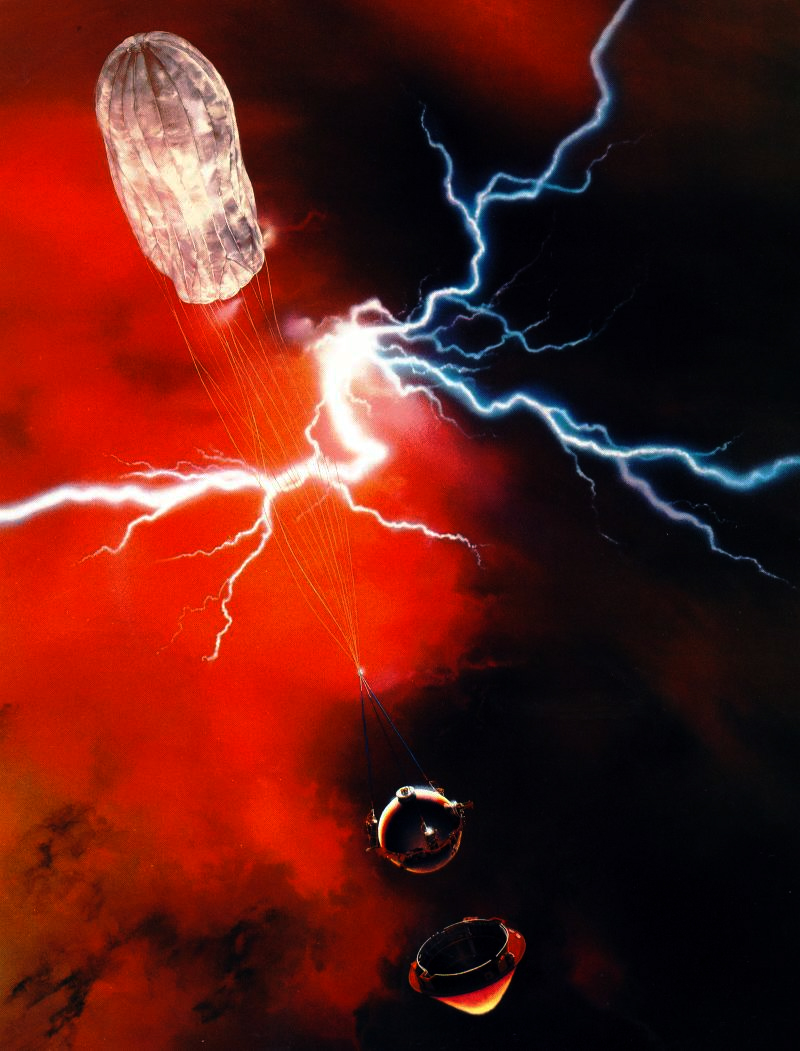
Pioneer Venus Large Probe opens its parachute (artist's rendition).

The large probe carried seven experiments, contained within a sealed spherical pressure vessel. The science experiments were:

- LNMS – neutral mass spectrometer to measure the atmospheric composition
- LGC – gas chromatograph to measure the atmospheric composition
- LSFR – solar flux radiometer to measure solar flux penetration in the atmosphere
- LIR – infrared radiometer to measure distribution of infrared radiation
- LCPS – cloud particle size spectrometer to measure particle size and shape
- LN – nephelometer to search for cloud particles
- temperature, pressure, and acceleration sensors

This pressure vessel was encased in a nose cone and aft protective cover. After deceleration from initial atmospheric entry at about 11.5 kilometers per second (7.1 mi/s) near the equator on the night side of Venus, a parachute was deployed at 67 kilometres' (42 mi) altitude. The large probe was about 150 centimeters (59 in) in diameter and the pressure vessel itself was 73.2 centimeters (28.8 in) in diameter.

=== Small probes ===
A small probe (1-antenna, 2-temperature sensor, 3-frontal protection, 4-hermetic container, 5-nephelometer, 6-radiometer)

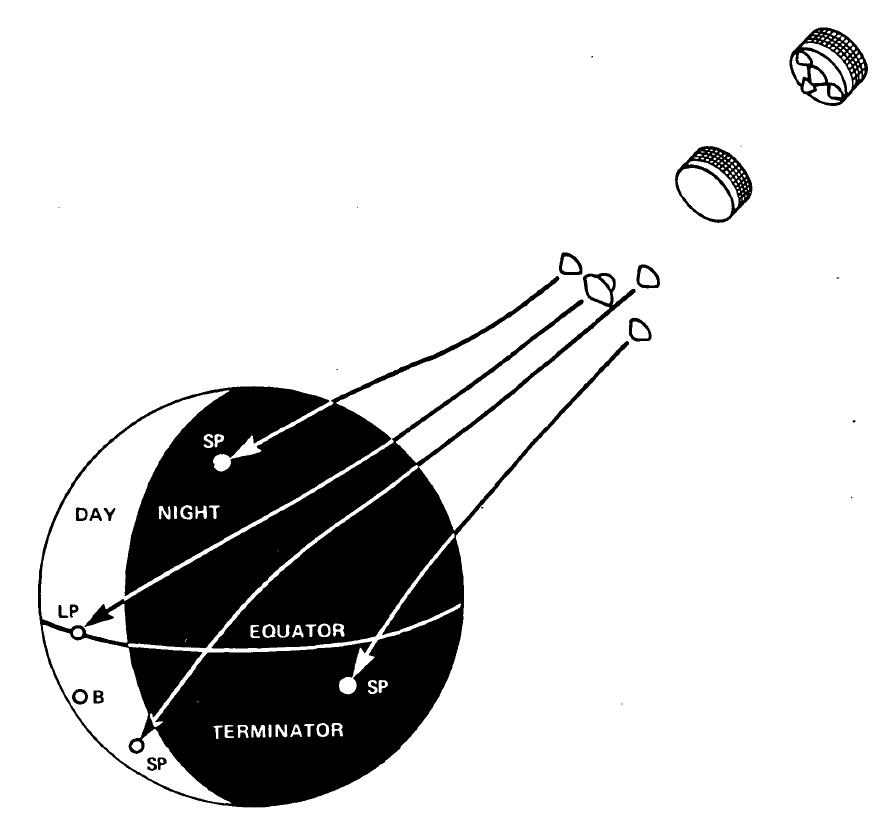
Entry of Pioneer Venus Multiprobe (comprising 1 large and 3 small probes)

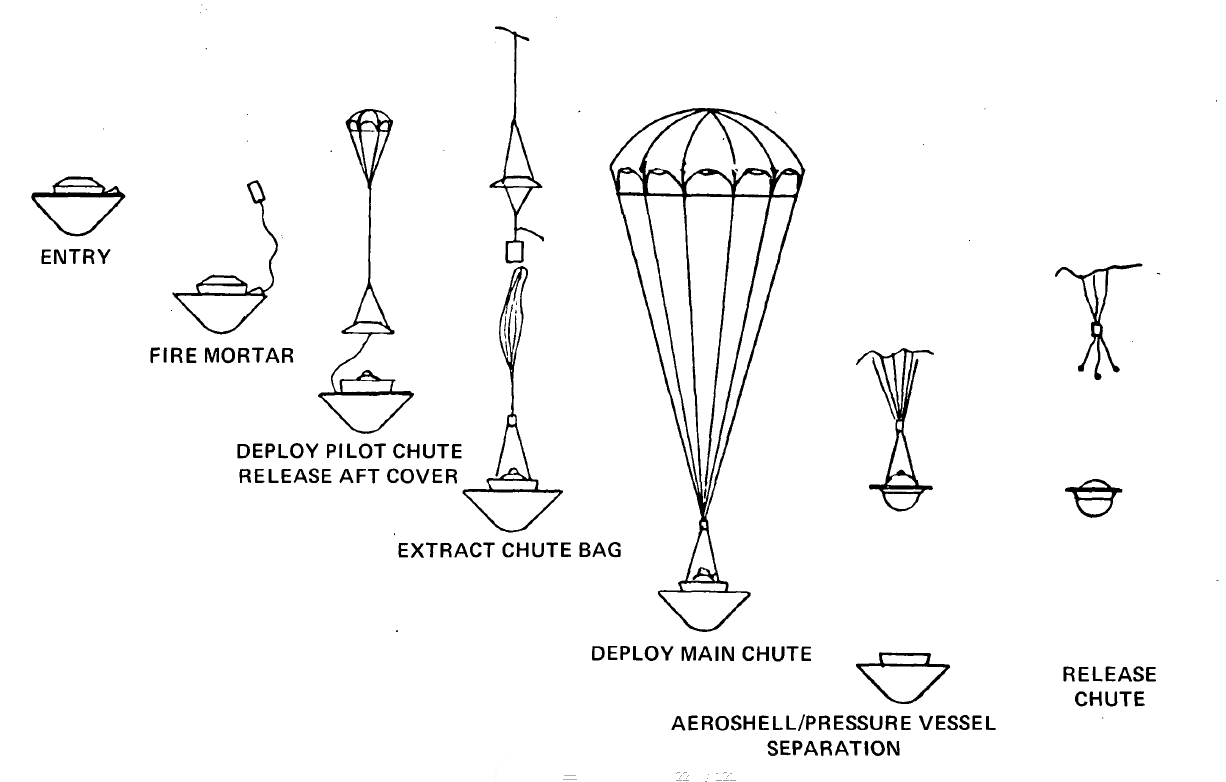
Pioneer Venus Large Probe descent sequence

Three identical small probes, around 0.8 meters (2 ft 7 in) in diameter, were deployed. These probes consisted of spherical pressure vessels surrounded by an aeroshell, but unlike the large probe, they had no parachutes and the aeroshells did not separate from the probes.

The science experiments were:

- a neutral mass spectrometer to measure the atmospheric composition
- a gas chromatograph to measure the atmospheric composition
- SNFR – solar flux radiometer to measure solar flux penetration in the atmosphere
- an infrared radiometer to measure distribution of infrared radiation
- MTUR – cloud particle size spectrometer to measure particle size and shape
- SN – nephelometer to search for cloud particles
- SAS – temperature, pressure, and acceleration sensors

The radio signals from all four probes were also used to characterize the winds, turbulence, and propagation in the atmosphere. The small probes were each targeted at different parts of the planet and were named accordingly.

- The North probe entered the atmosphere at about 60 degrees north latitude on the day side.
- The Night probe entered on the night side.
- The Day probe entered well into the day side, and was the only one of the four probes which continued to send radio signals back after impact, for over an hour.

== Launch ==
The Pioneer Venus Multiprobe was launched by an Atlas SLV-3D Centaur-D1AR rocket, which flew from Launch Complex 36A at the Cape Canaveral Air Force Station. The launch occurred at 07:33 on August 8, 1978, and deployed the Multiprobe into heliocentric orbit for its coast to Venus.

== Arrival at Venus ==
Prior to the Multiprobe reaching Venus, the four probes were deployed from the main bus. The large probe was released on November 16, 1978, and the three small probes on November 20.

All four probes and the bus reached Venus on December 9, 1978. The large probe was the first to enter the atmosphere, at 18:45:32 UTC, followed over the next 11 minutes by the other three probes. The bus entered the atmosphere at 20:21:52 UTC and returned its last signal at 20:22:55 from an altitude of 110 kilometres (68 mi).

The four probes transmitted data until they impacted the surface of Venus. The Day Probe survived the impact, returning data from the surface for 67 minutes and 37 seconds after reaching the surface.

Pioneer Venus probes and bus: atmospheric entry and impacts (all times in UT)
	Entry time (200 km)	Impact time	Loss of signal	Impact coordinates	Solar zenith angle	Local Venus time
Large Probe	18:45:32	19:39:53	19:39:53	4.4°N 304.0°E	65.7	7:38
North Probe	18:49:40	19:42:40	19:42:40	59.3°N 4.8°E	108.0	3:35
Day Probe	18:52:18	19:47:59	20:55:34	31.3°S 317.0°E	79.9	6:46
Night Probe	18:56:13	19:52:05	19:52:07	28.7°S 56.7°E	150.7	0:07
Bus	20:21:52	(signal lost at 110 km altitude)	20:22:55	37.9°S 290.9°E (estimated)	60.7	8:30

== Scientific results ==
Below an altitude of 50 kilometres (31 mi) the temperatures measured by the four probes were identical to within a few degrees, between 448 and 459 °C (838 and 858 °F) on the surface; the ground pressure, between 86.2 and 94.5 bars (8,620 and 9,450 kPa). Nephelometers identified three cloud layers with different characteristics. The most remarkable discovery was that the ratio of ^{36}argon / ^{40}argon isotopes was much higher than in the Earth's atmosphere, which seems to indicate that the genesis of the Venusian atmosphere is very different from that of Earth's. The reconstituted trajectory of the atmospheric probes determined that the wind averaged 200 meters per second (660 ft/s) in the middle cloud layer, 50 meters per second (160 ft/s) at the base of these clouds and just 1 meter per second (3.3 ft/s) on the ground. Overall data from airborne sensors confirmed and refined the data obtained by the Soviet Venera program that preceded the American mission to Venus.

== Trajectory ==
Diagram of the PVM's path to planet Venus from Earth in 1978, and this also notes the launch of the Pioneer Venus Orbiter which took place that year also.

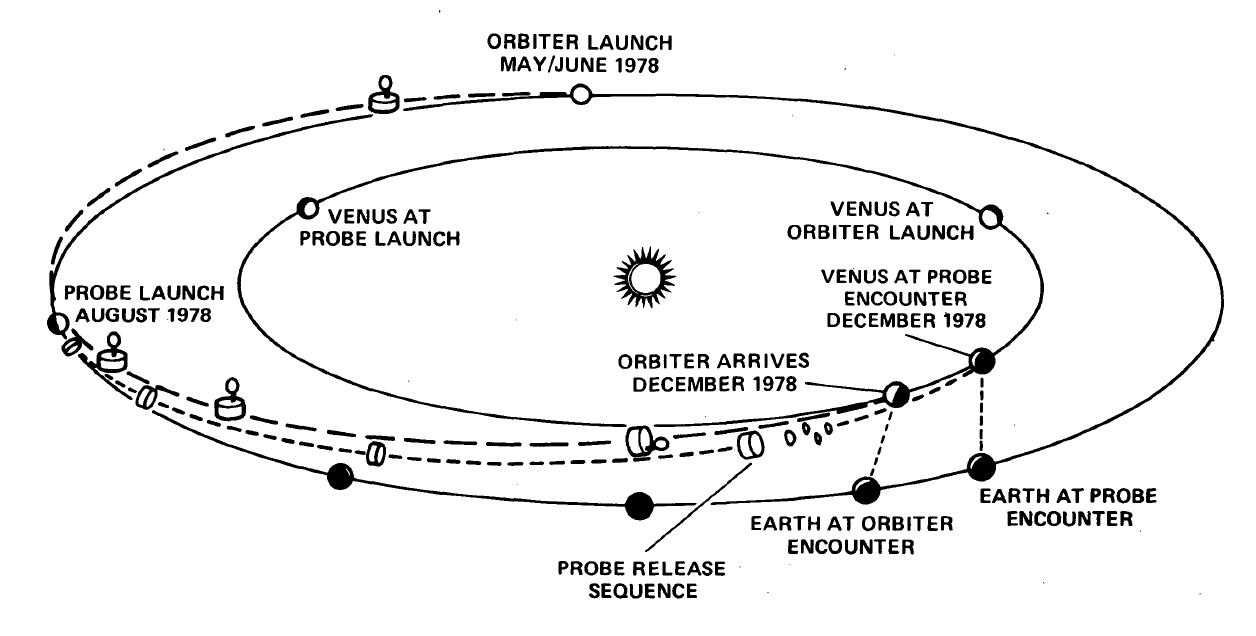
Trajectory of Pioneer Venus Multiprobe in 1978

== Graphic overview ==
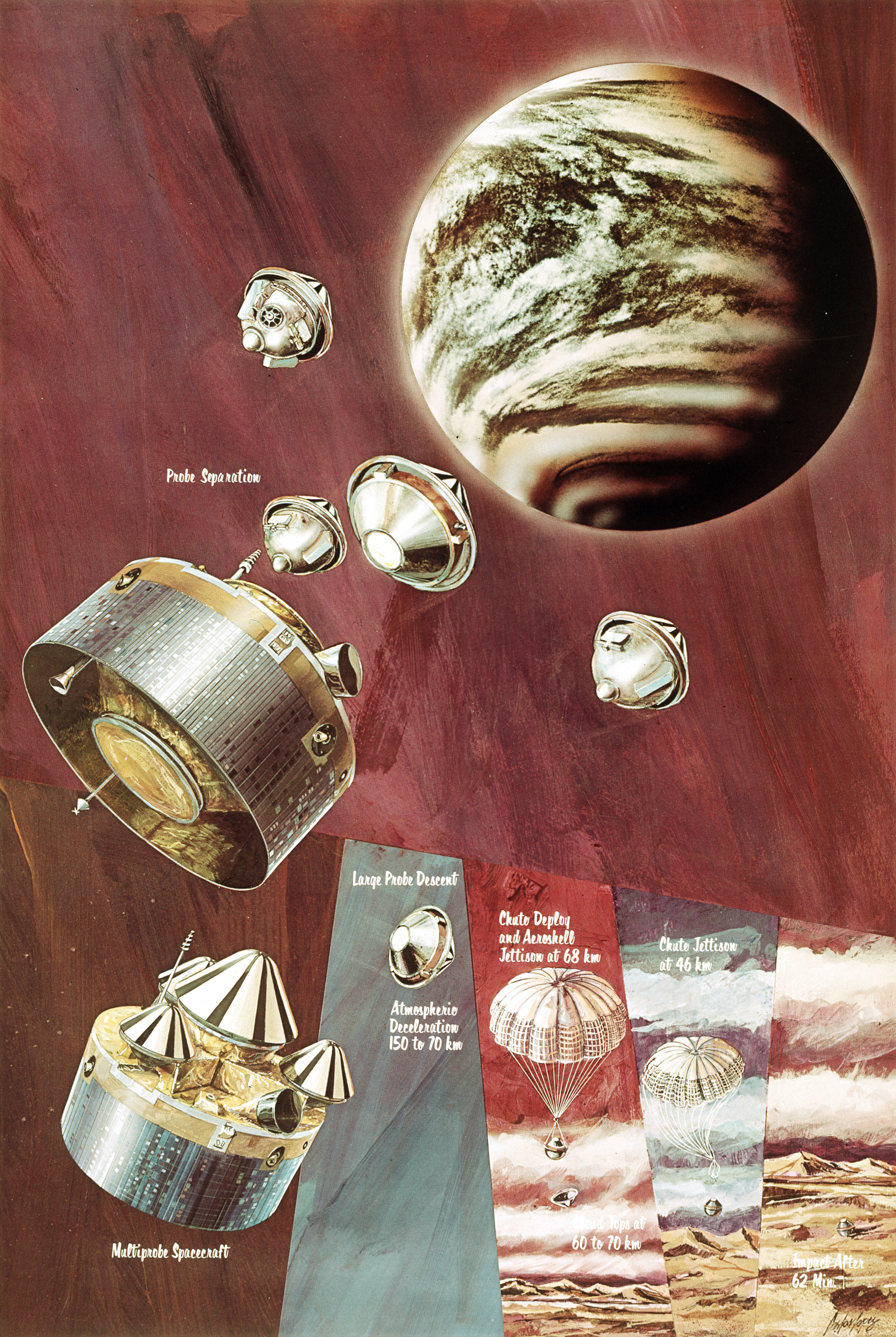
Pioneer Venus Multiprobe infographic

== See also ==
- Pioneer Venus Orbiter
- DAVINCI, upcoming Venus atmospheric probe scheduled to arrive in 2034
- List of missions to Venus
- Timeline of artificial satellites and space probes
- Galileo Probe (Jupiter atmospheric probe delivered by Galileo spacecraft)
- List of spacecraft powered by non-rechargeable batteries
