= Batteries in space =

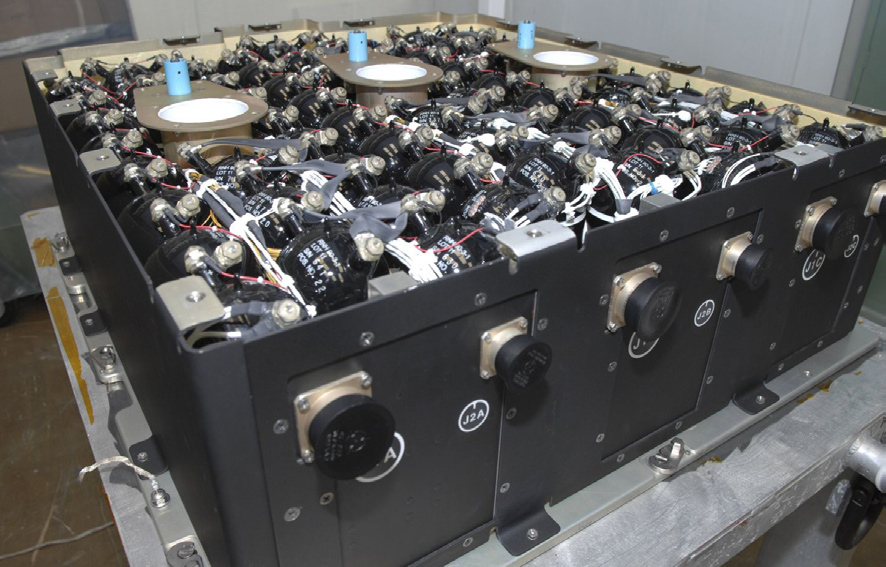
Nickel-Hydrogen batteries for Hubble

Batteries are used on spacecraft as a means of power storage. Primary batteries contain all their usable energy when assembled and can only be discharged. Secondary batteries can be recharged from some other energy source, such as solar panels or radioisotope-based power (RTG), and can deliver power during periods when the space vehicle is out of direct sunlight. Batteries generate electrical current from a chemical reaction.

Batteries for spacecraft must be sealed to operate in a vacuum. They must withstand the acceleration of launch, and vibration while attaining orbit. They must be able to operate over a wide temperature range, and must not emit gases that would corrode the space vehicle, disturb its trajectory, or contaminate instruments or life support systems. Batteries for vehicles orbiting the Earth must also resist the high ionizing radiation level above the shield of the Earth's atmosphere. Artificial satellites, such as communication satellites, require battery systems that can withstand thousands of charge and discharge cycles over the satellite's intended life.

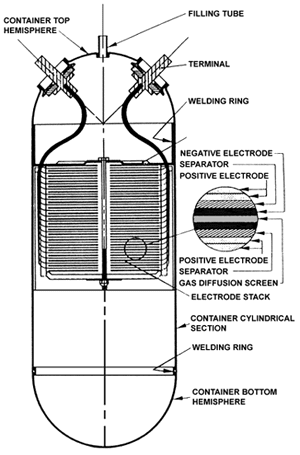
Schematic of the internal arrangement of nickel-hydrogen rechargeable battery.

Primary batteries are used for relatively short-duration tasks. Early satellites had design lives of only a few weeks or months, and could carry enough primary batteries to provide the required service life. Longer-duration tasks require a rechargeable system, where solar cells or a radioisotope generator can provide energy to recharge the battery. A satellite near the Earth will be shadowed for half of each orbit, and so requires batteries to maintain operation. Even satellites in a geosynchronous orbit experience regular "eclipse periods" of varying duration. Vehicles such as the Apollo spacecraft and the Space Shuttle required more power than could be supplied by batteries or solar panels, and so relied on hydrogen fuel cells to provide several kilowatts of power for hundreds of hours.

A reserve battery is a primary battery that keeps its chemical reactants separated until needed. This improves the standby life of the battery, since side reactions cannot occur if the electrolyte and electrodes are separated. In another form, the electrolyte is heated to become conductive during operation. Such batteries may have short service lives, but are very reliable after extended storage. They are used in missiles that have long standby time, or in space probes that require power during landing on a planet.

Betavoltaic devices are also increasingly used to power microelectronic applications in space, including NASA efforts to conduct ground-based observations of the lunar south pole with autonomous sensors powered by NanoTritium batteries.

The table below lists common battery types used in space.

Types
Battery type	Formula	Specific energy (W*hr)/kg	Notes
Hydrogen Fuel Cell	H	275	
Lithium–sulfur dioxide	LiSO2	200	
Lithium–thionyl chloride	LiSOCl2	200	
Lithium-bromine in thionyl chloride	Li-BCX		
Lithum-Iron disulfide	LiFeS2		
Nickel–cadmium	NiCd	30	
Nickel–hydrogen	NiH2	60	
Sodium-sulfur	Na-S		
Silver-cadmium	Ag-Cd		
Silver–zinc	AgZn	100	
Zinc-mercury oxide	Zn-HgO		

== See also ==
- List of spacecraft powered by non-rechargeable batteries
- Solar panels on spacecraft
- Nuclear power in space
