= Schiaparelli EDM =

Mars landing demonstration system

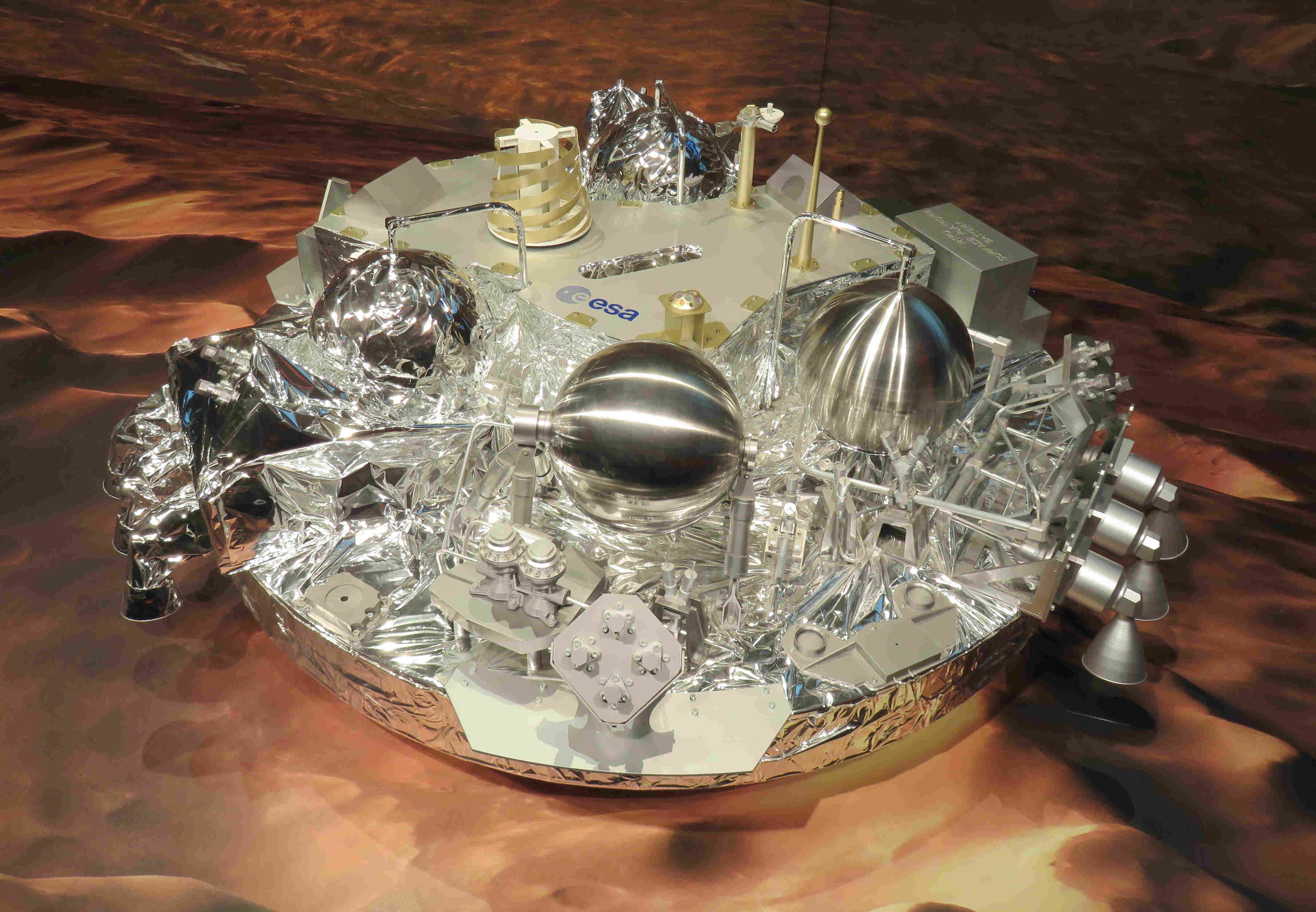
- Model of Schiaparelli lander at ESOC (2016)
- Mission type: Mars lander / technology demonstrator
- Operator: ESA · Roscosmos
- COSPAR ID: 2016-017A
- SATCAT no.: 41388
- Website: ESA mission website
- Mission duration: Planned: 2 to 8 sols (surface stay); Preceded by 3 day coast between separation and entry

Spacecraft properties
- Manufacturer: Thales Alenia Space
- Launch mass: 577 kg (1,272 lb)
- Dimensions: Diameter: 2.4 m (7.9 ft); Height: 1.8 m (5.9 ft)

Start of mission
- Launch date: 14 March 2016, 09:31 UTC
- Rocket: Proton-M/Briz-M
- Launch site: Baikonur Site 200/39
- Contractor: Khrunichev

End of mission
- Disposal: Crash-landed
- Destroyed: 19 October 2016
- Landing site: Meridiani Planum, Mars; 2.05°S 6.21°W
Instruments
- DREAMS: Dust Characterization, Risk Assessment, and Environment Analyzer on the Martian Surface
- AMELIA: Atmospheric Mars Entry and Landing Investigation and Analysis
- COMARS+: Combined Aerothermal Sensor Package
- DECA: Descent Camera
- INRRI: Passive mini retro-reflector

Schiaparelli EDM (Italian: [skjapaˈrɛlli]) was a failed Entry, Descent, and Landing Demonstrator Module (EDM) of the ExoMars programme—a joint mission of the European Space Agency (ESA) and the Russian Space Agency Roscosmos. It was built in Italy and was intended to test technology for future soft landings on the surface of Mars. It also had a limited but focused science payload that would have measured atmospheric electricity on Mars and local meteorological conditions.

Launched together with the ExoMars Trace Gas Orbiter (TGO) on 14 March 2016, Schiaparelli attempted a landing on 19 October 2016. Telemetry signals from Schiaparelli, monitored in real time by the Giant Metrewave Radio Telescope in India (and confirmed by Mars Express), were lost about one minute from the surface during the final landing stages. On 21 October 2016, NASA released an image by the Mars Reconnaissance Orbiter showing what appears to be the lander's crash site. The telemetry data accumulated and relayed by ESA's ExoMars Trace Gas Orbiter and Mars Express were used to investigate the failure modes of the landing technology employed.

== Namesake ==
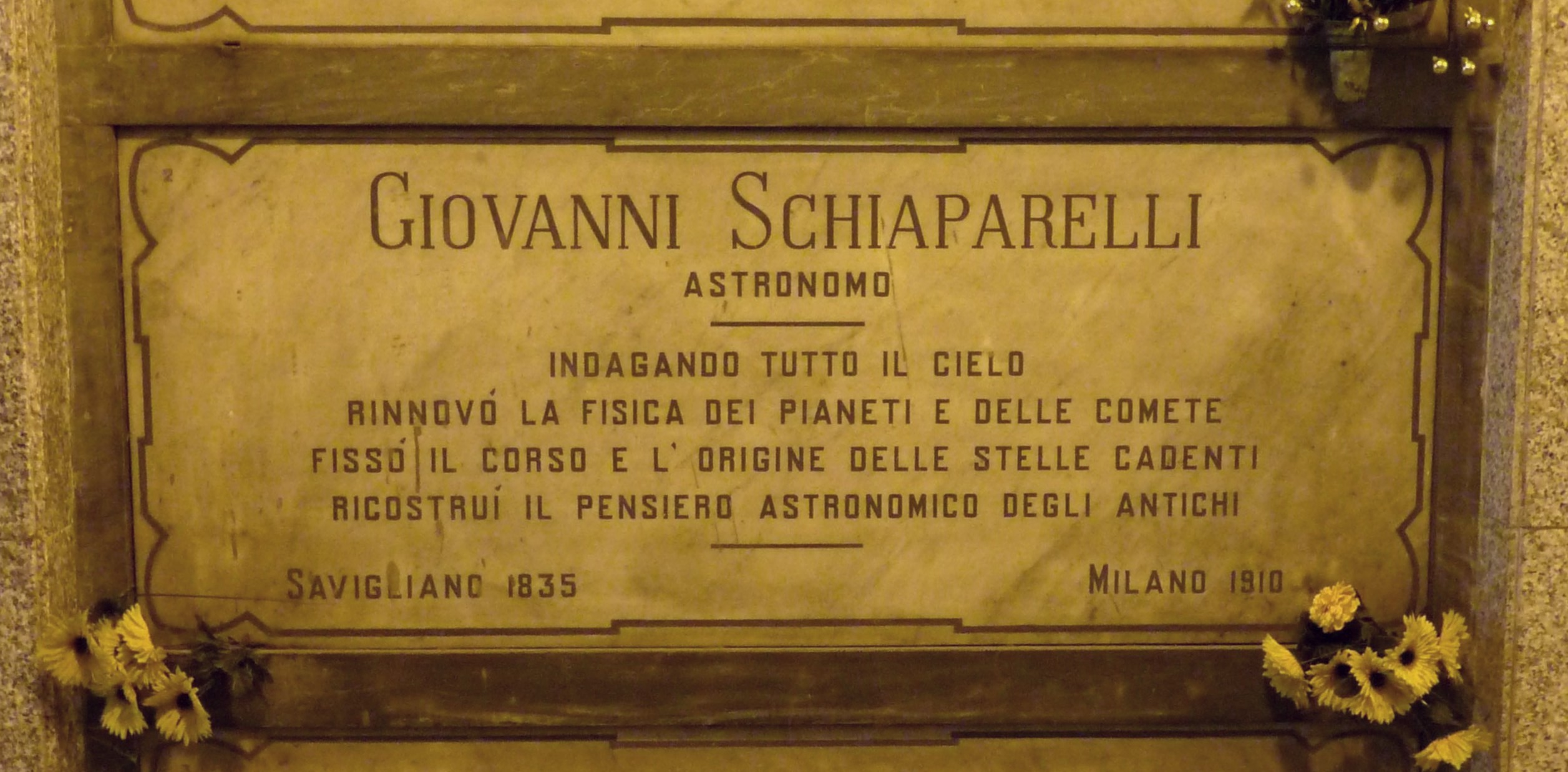
Schiaparelli's grave in Milan, Italy

The Schiaparelli Entry, Descent, and Landing Demonstrator module is named for Giovanni Schiaparelli (1835–1910), an astronomer active in the 19th century who made Mars observations. In particular, he recorded features he called canali in his native Italian. His observations of what translates as channels in English inspired many. The dark streaks on Mars are an albedo feature which is related to dust distribution; these albedo features on Mars slowly change over time, and in the last few decades have been monitored by Mars orbiters. Schiaparelli is famous for making hand-drawn maps of Mars during its 1877 oppositions with Earth with an optical refracting telescope. He was also the first astronomer to determine the relationship between comet debris and yearly meteor showers.

Other things named for Schiaparelli include the main-belt asteroid 4062 Schiaparelli, named on 15 September 1989 (M.P.C. 15090), the lunar crater Schiaparelli, the Martian crater Schiaparelli, Schiaparelli Dorsum on Mercury, and the 2016 ExoMars EDM lander.

The mission was named in November 2013; previously it was known as the Exomars Entry, descent and landing Demonstrator Module, or ExoMars EDM for short. Another name was ExoMars static lander, however some designs for what was the static lander are quite different due to various stages of design and program restructuring. Another name, especially for both orbiter and lander together is ExoMars 2016.

== Origins and development ==
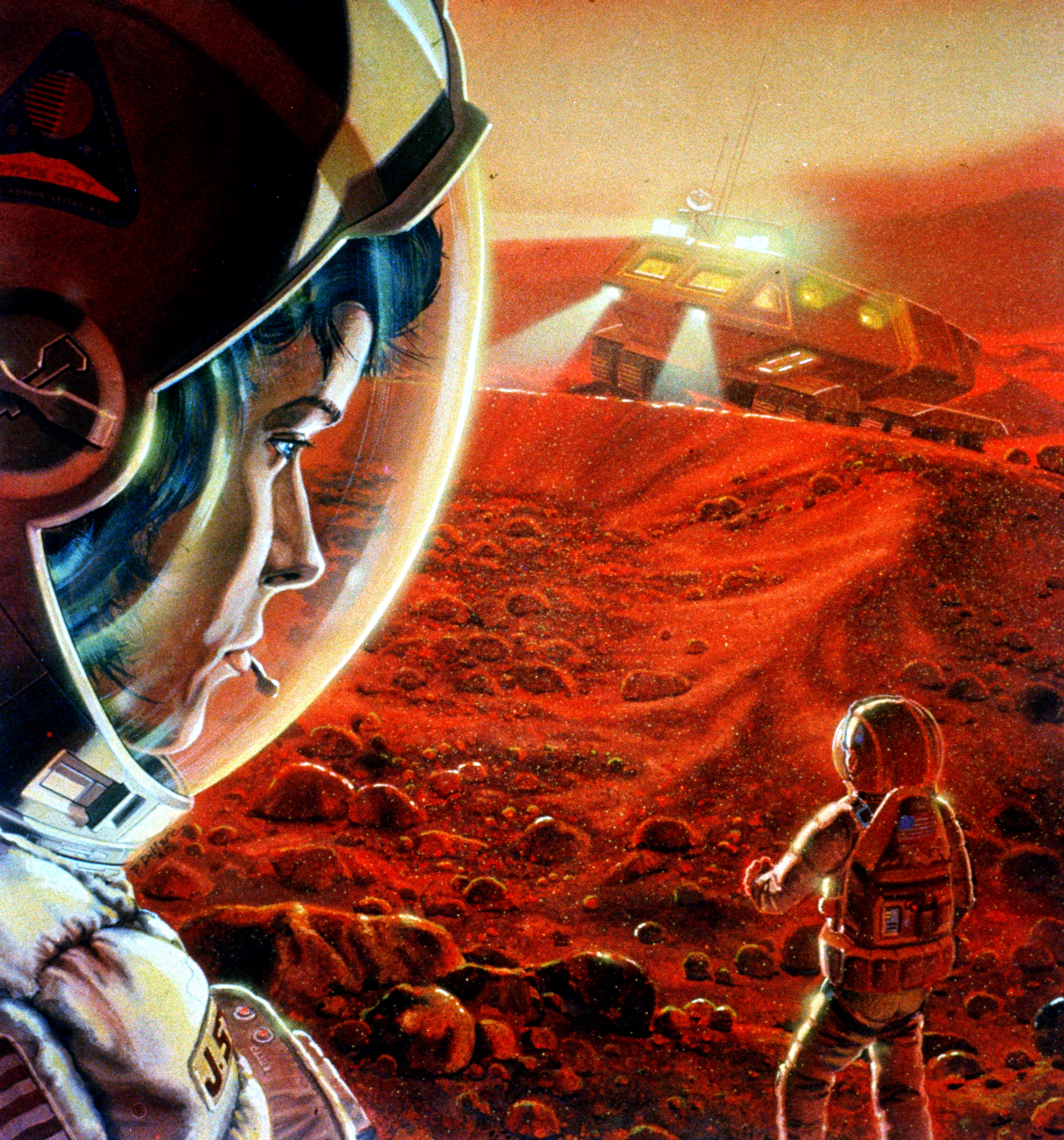
This space art, titled The Next Stop, was selected by the ESA when discussing its Aurora flagship ExoMars program, and features people enduring a Mars dust storm near a crewed Mars rover.

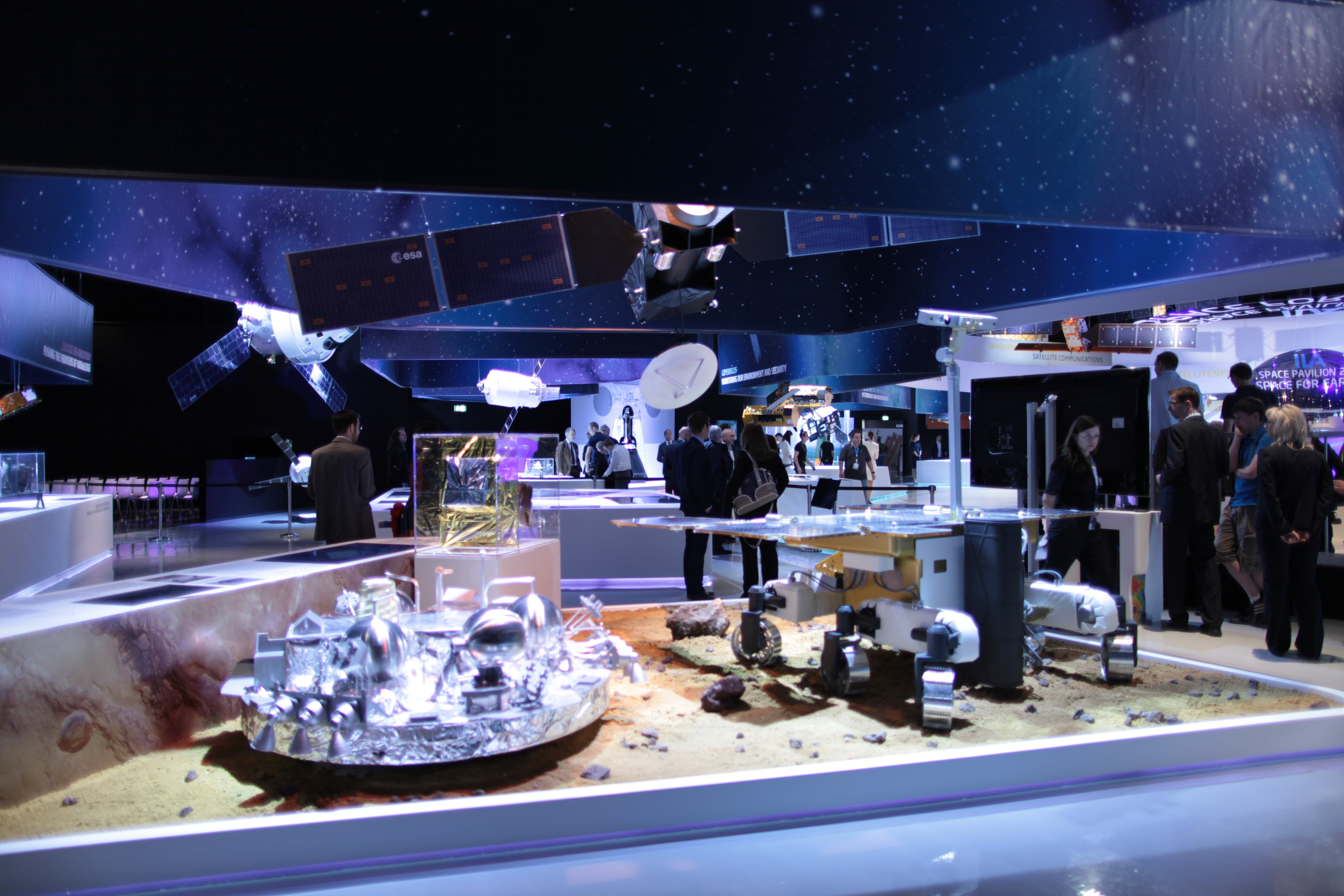
Models of Schiaparelli and the ExoMars rover at ESA ESTEC, 2014

The EDM traces itself back to the ESA Aurora programme, which has the goal of human exploration of space, and thus producing missions that are building blocks to support this goal. ExoMars originated out of this, and provides context for understanding the EDM. Schiaparelli forms an important "block" of learning how to land heavy payloads on Mars, which is vital to future crewed missions. Another "block" is the ExoMars rover, which is intended to demonstrate among other things the ability to traverse several km/miles on the surface of Mars. The Aurora program is focused on two types of the mission, one are larger flagship spacecraft and the other are smaller missions specifically meant to offload risk from the larger missions.

In 2005 the ESA council approved 650 million Euros for a Mars rover and static lander. At this time the idea was for a single launch bringing both a Mars Exploration Rover class rover and instrumented static lander to Mars with a simpler cruise stage;in this case the static lander both landed the rover and performed its own studies. However to accomplish its mission goals within the constraints of using a Soyuz rocket for launch, the rover was budgeted for just 6 kg. To enable a larger rover, the Ariane V, Atlas V, and Proton were evaluated. Rovers from 180 kg up to 600 kg were considered, and eventually the idea of test lander to offload risk from the rover lander arose, which fitted well with a two-launch strategy allowing a heavier orbiter and a heavier rover on the second launch.

Early in development, the lander was to be carried by a dedicated cruise stage called the Carrier Module. Eventually, the Trace Gas Orbiter mission was merged into ExoMars, becoming the carrier for the EDM.

== Overview ==
Although the lander crashed, the data transmitted from Schiaparelli are expected to provide ESA and Roscosmos with the technology for landing on the surface of Mars with a controlled soft landing. This technology will be used by the Rosalind Franklin rover, part of the ExoMars programme, which was due to launch in 2022. The rovers' launch has been delayed as a consequence of the Russian invasion of Ukraine. In July 2022, ESA terminated its cooperation on the project with Russia. As of May 2022, the launch of the rover is not expected to occur before 2028 due to the need for a new non-Russian landing platform.

=== Pre-launch ===
The 577 kg (1,272 lb) descent module Schiaparelli and orbiter completed testing and were integrated to a Proton-M rocket at the Baikonur cosmodrome in Baikonur in mid-January 2016. TGO and EDM arrived at Baikonur in December 2015. In February the spacecraft was mounted to the Briz-M upper stage, and in early March that was attached to the Proton rocket.

=== Liftoff ===
The launch occurred at 09:31 GMT (15:31 local time) on 14 March 2016. Four rocket burns occurred in the following 10 hours before the descent module and orbiter were released. A signal from the orbiter was received at 21:29 GMT that day, confirming that the launch was successful and the spacecraft was functioning properly. Shortly after separation from the probes, the Briz-M upper booster stage exploded a few kilometres away, without damaging the orbiter or lander.

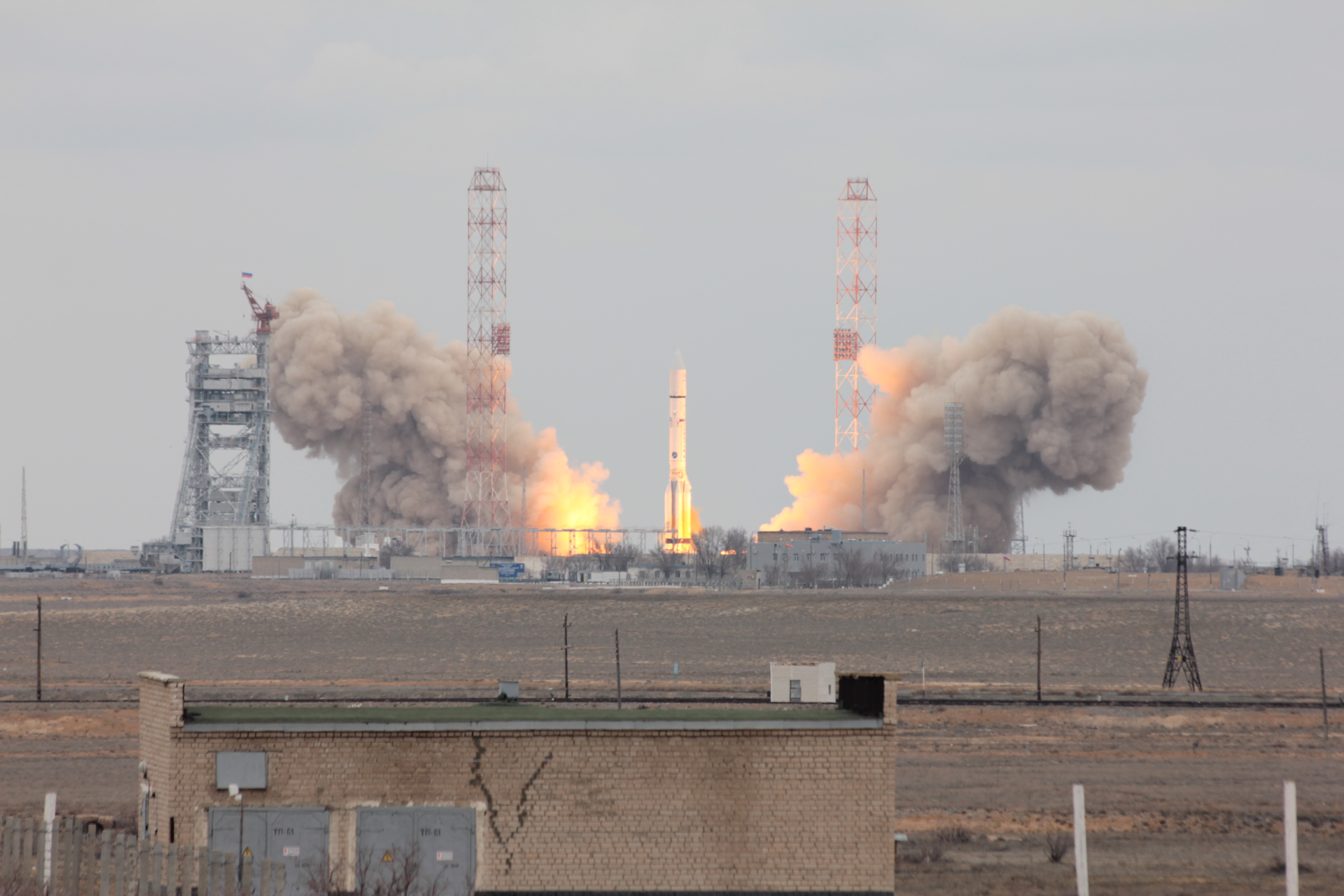
Liftoff for ExoMars 2016 carrying the Schiaparelli demonstrator

=== Cruise, separation and arrival ===
After its launch, the Trace Gas Orbiter (TGO) and EDM traveled together coasting through space towards Mars. During this time the EDM was powered from an umbilical power line to the TGO, thus preserving the EDM's limited internal batteries. A deep space manoeuvre was executed by the TGO main engine in two legs on 28 July and on 11 August in order to target the entry flight path angle and the landing site. On 14 October 2016, the TGO did a final adjustment to its trajectory before the separation of Schiaparelli. The launch mass of the two spacecraft together is 4332 kg including the 600 kg Schiaparelli module. This was the heaviest spacecraft yet sent to Mars. The journey from Earth to Mars in 2016 took about 7 months.

On 16 October 2016, the TGO and EDM separated, the orbiter heading for Mars orbit insertion and the EDM for Mars atmospheric entry. Prior to the separation, the EDM was spun up 2.5 RPM (see also spin stabilization) and then released at a velocity of about 1 km/h relative to TGO. The EDM was designed to go into a lower-power hibernation mode for about 3 days while it traveled solo to Mars. The EDM came out of hibernation about an hour and a half prior to reaching the Martian atmosphere. Meanwhile, after the separation, the TGO adjusted its trajectory for its Mars orbit insertion and by 19 October 2016 performed a 139-minute rocket engine burn to enter Mars orbit. On the same day, the Schiaparelli module arrived at Mars traveling at 21,000 km/h (13,000 mph; 5.8 km/s) and engaged in its prime task of entry, descent, and landing. After a successful atmospheric entry, the module's speed was reduced from the 5.8 km/s entry value to a few hundred m/s due to the drag force provided by the atmosphere of Mars. During this phase of the flight, a heat shield was used to protect the payload from the severe heat load. The parachute was triggered by the on-board software when the accelerometers detected a given non-gravitational acceleration value of 9 m/s^{2}, as expected. After having reached the sub-sonic regime by means of the nominally-inflated parachute, the Schiaparelli module experienced an anomaly causing the backshell and parachute release to occur earlier than expected and preventing the retrorockets from slowing the descent. The hard touch-down location, reconstructed using data from the Mars Reconnaissance Orbiter, was identified quite close to the expected landing site, about 6.4 km short-range from it. The TGO entered Mars's orbit and it underwent several months of aerobraking to adjust its speed and orbit, with science activities beginning in late 2017. The TGO will continue serving as a relay satellite for future Mars landing missions until 2022.

=== Landing site ===
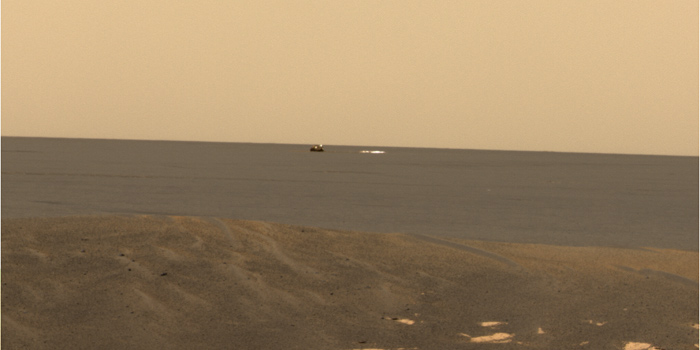
View of Meridiani Planum by the Opportunity rover in 2004, an area favored by probe landings for its smooth dunes and mostly boulder-free plains.

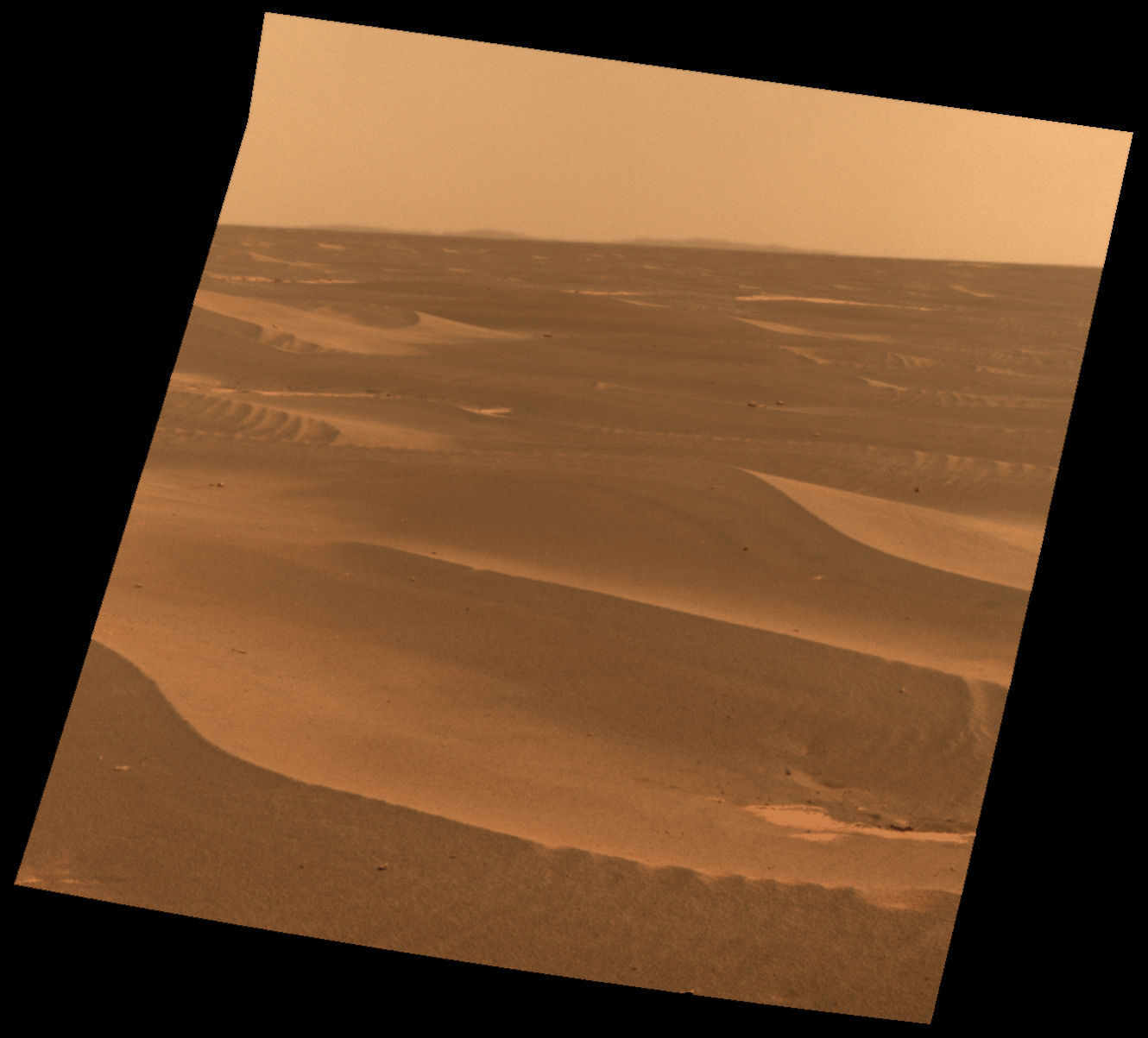
Another view of Meridiani Planum by the Opportunity rover. Bopolu crater rim is in the distance, also south of the Schiaparelli landing zone

The landing site chosen was Meridiani Planum, a Martian plain prized by Mars landers for its flat terrain and low elevation that gives a spacecraft time and distance to slow down before reaching the ground. The EDM cannot avoid obstacles during its descent, so it was important to pick a large flat area with a minimum of obstacles. The landing ellipse is about 100 km long by 15 km wide, centered at 6° west and 2° south running east–west, with the eastern edge including the Opportunity rover landing site, and near Endeavour crater where it was still operating when the EDM was launched and when it attempted to land. The Opportunity rover (MER-B) landing site is called the Challenger Memorial Station. It was also thought that the EDM would have a chance of arriving when Mars experienced its global dust storms, and thus gain knowledge about the atmosphere under these less common conditions. The site is also known to be scientifically interesting; the Opportunity rover discovered a type of iron mineral that forms in the presence of water, so it is theorized there was a significant amount of water there in the past.

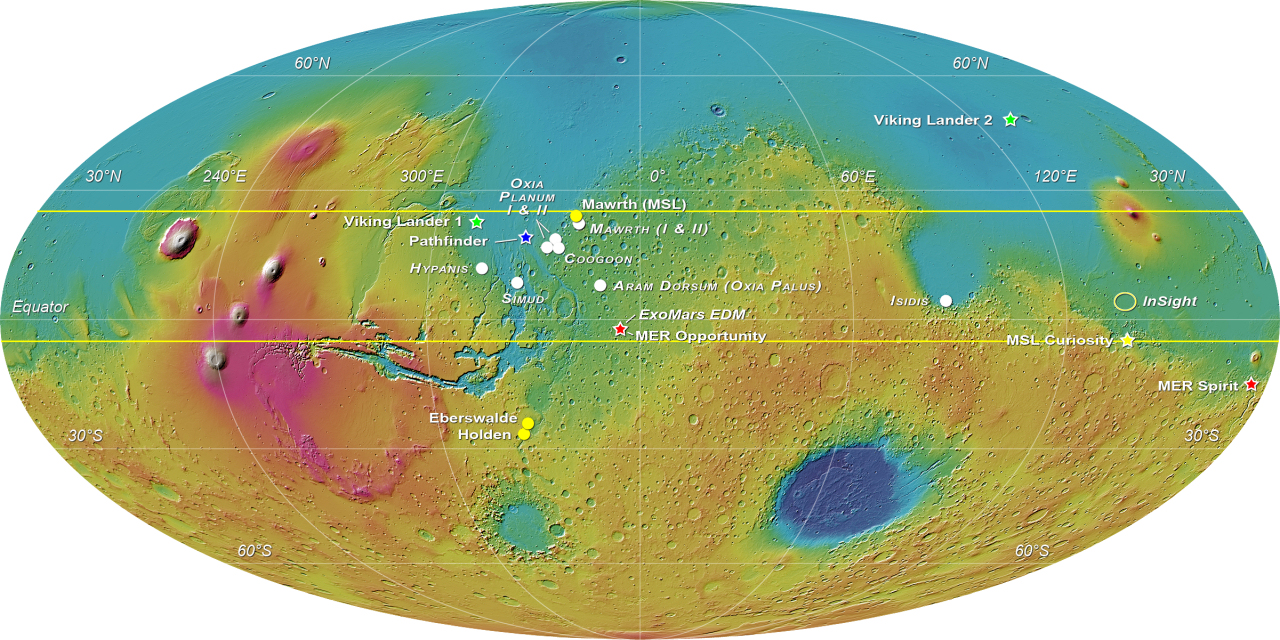
The red star denotes the planned landing site for the ExoMars Schiaparelli EDM lander: Meridiani Planum, close to where the Opportunity rover landed in 2004.

=== Dust storm goal ===
The landing was planned to take place on Meridiani Planum during the dust storm season, which would have provided a chance to characterise a dust-loaded atmosphere during entry and descent, measure the dust's static electricity charge—typically produced by charge transfer on contact between particles—and to conduct surface measurements associated with a dust-rich environment.

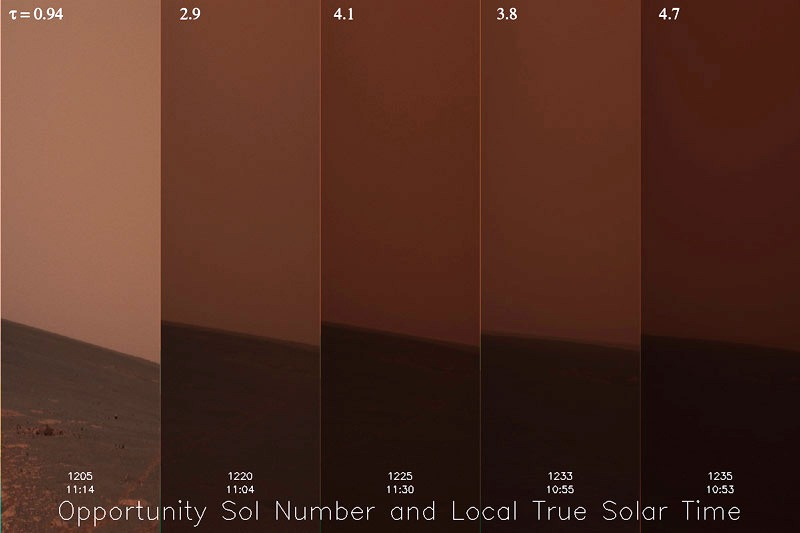
Time-lapse composite of the Martian horizon over 30 Martian days shows how much sunlight the July 2007 dust storms blocked; Tau of 4.7 indicates 99% sunlight blocked.

Global dust storms have occurred at least nine times since 1924 including 1977, 1982, 1994, 2001 and 2007; the 2007 dust storms nearly ended the functioning of the solar-powered U.S. Mars Exploration Rovers Spirit and Opportunity. Global dust storms obscured Mars when the Mariner 9 orbiter arrived there in 1971, and it took several weeks for the dust to settle down and allow for clear imaging of the surface of Mars. It was predicted that Mars global dust storms were likely to occur in the fall of 2016, but they had not started when the EDM attempted its landing. Global dust storms hit in the summer of 2018, cutting off light to the solar powered Opportunity rover which was still operating nearby to the Schiaparelli landing site.

== Entry, descent, and landing events sequence ==
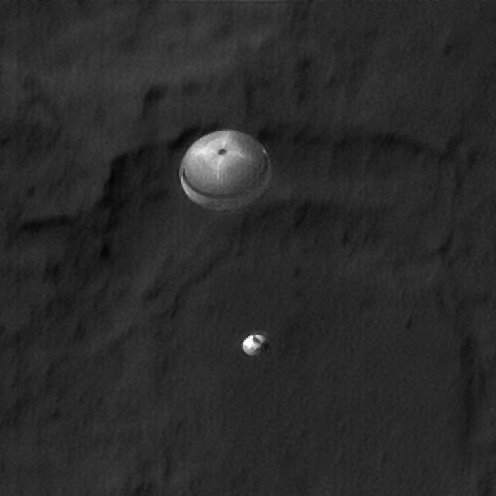
The MSL entry vehicle during the parachute phase of its descent. Schiaparelli was designed to deploy its parachute at 11 km above Mars.

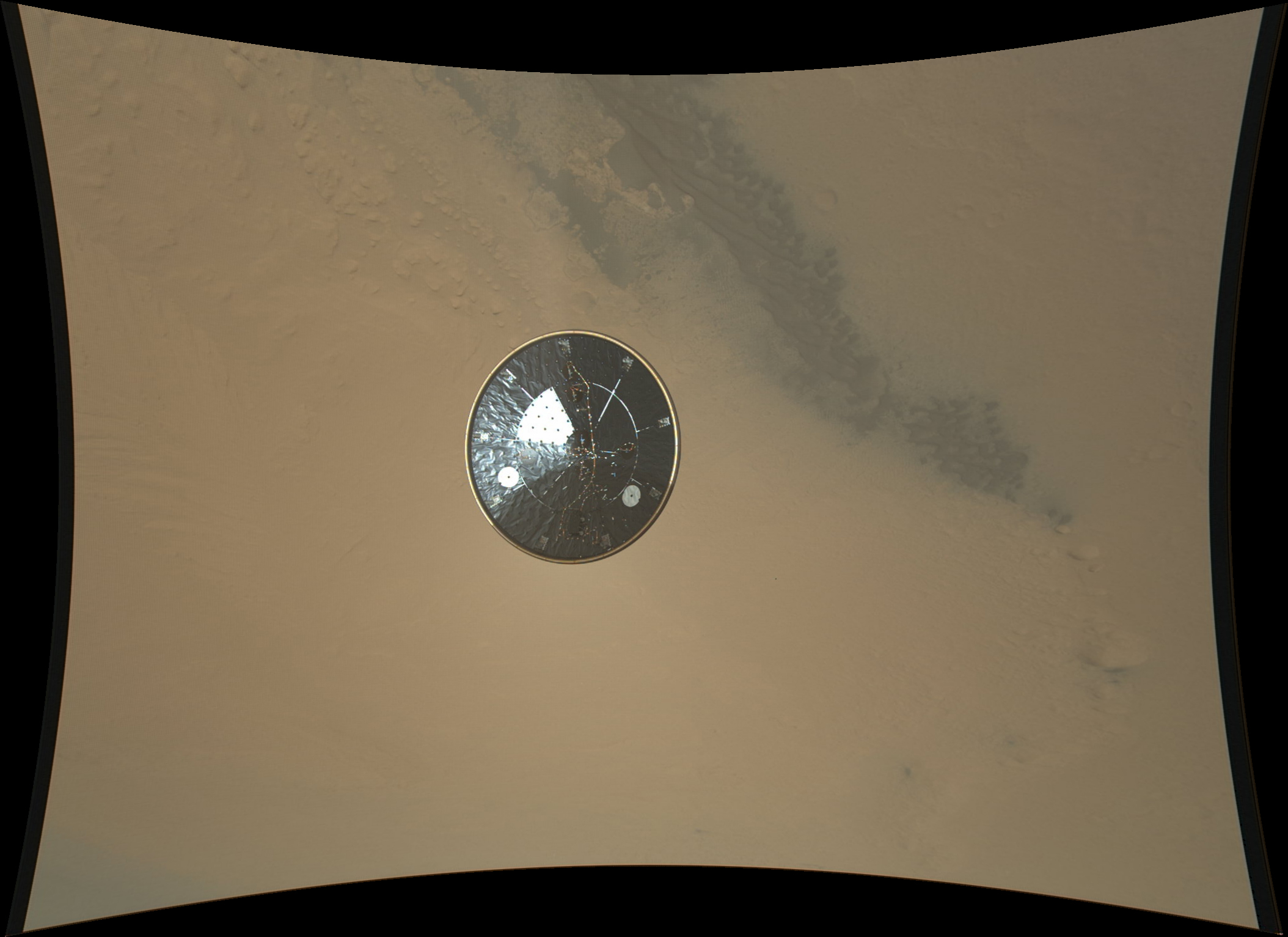
The MSL entry vehicle ejecting its heat shield over Mars. Schiaparelli was designed to eject its lower heat shield at an altitude of 7 km above Mars.

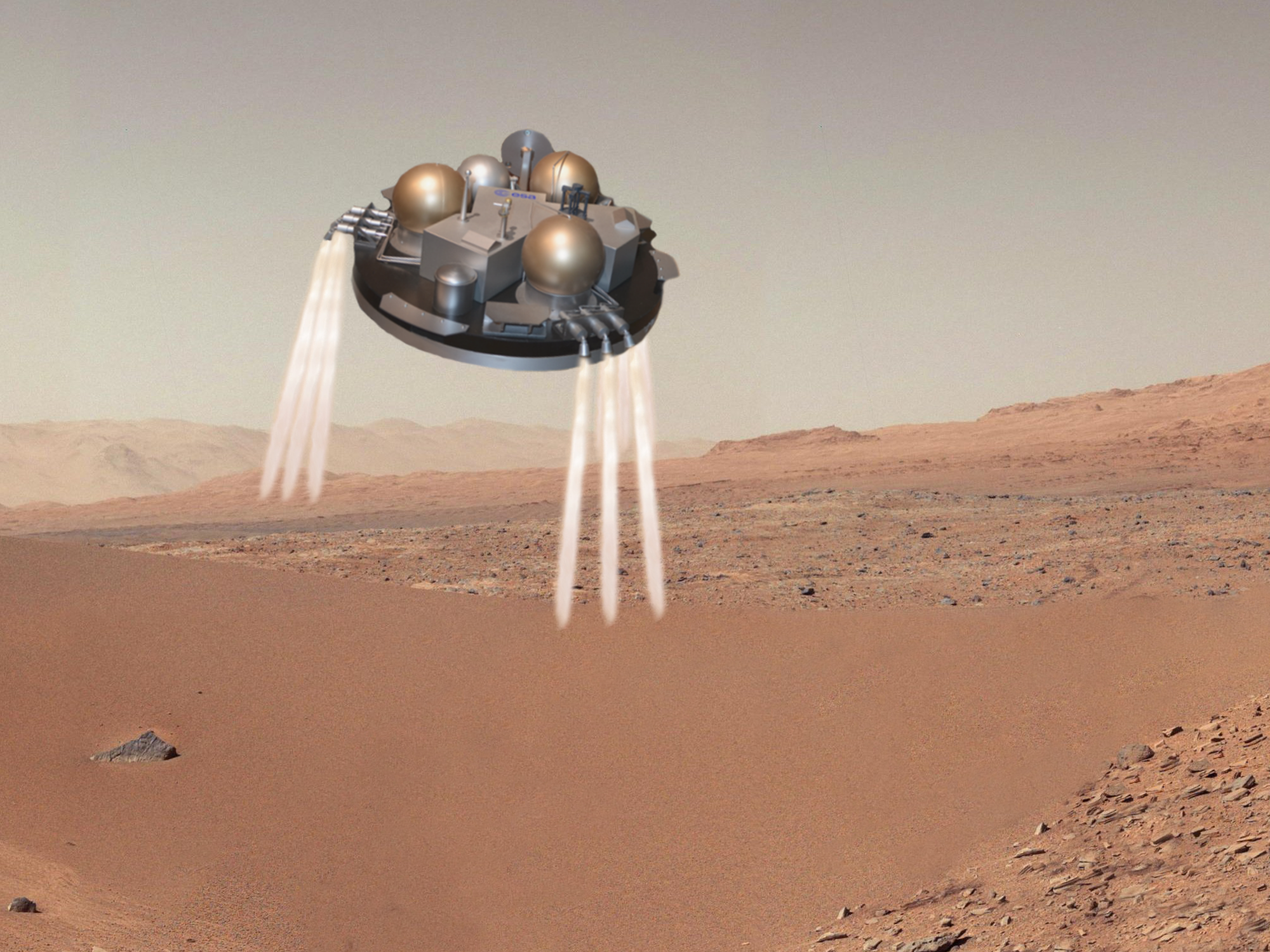
Depiction of the EDM during the rocket-assisted descent portion of its Mars landing

The Schiaparelli lander separated from the TGO orbiter on 16 October 2016, three days before arrival at Mars, and entered the atmosphere at 21,000 km/h (13,000 mph) on 19 October 2016 (see also Mars atmospheric entry). When the lander disconnected from the orbiter, it switched to internal battery power and used a low-power hibernation mode while it coasted for three days just before entering the Martian atmosphere. Schiaparelli came out of hibernation several hours before its entry, at a speed of 21,000 km/h (13,000 mph) and an altitude of 122.5 km (76.1 mi) above the surface of Mars. The heat shield was used during the plunge into the atmosphere to decelerate the lander to 1,650 km/h (1,030 mph) by the time it reached 11 km (6.8 mi) altitude. During entry the COMARS+ instrumentation the EDM operated to collect data on how heat and air flow around the entry capsule.

After slowing its initial entry through the atmosphere, the module deployed a parachute and was to complete its landing on retrorockets by using a closed-loop guidance, navigation and control system based on a Doppler radar altimeter sensor, and on-board inertial measurement units. Throughout the descent, various sensors recorded a number of atmospheric parameters and lander performance. The plan was that at 7 km (4.3 mi) in altitude the front heat shield would be jettisoned and the radar altimeter turned on, then at 1.3 km (0.81 mi) altitude above Mars the rear heat cover and parachute would be jettisoned.

The final stages of the landing were to be performed using pulse-firing liquid-fuel engines or retrorockets. About two metres above ground, the engines were designed to turn off and let the platform land on a crushable structure, designed to deform and absorb the final touchdown impact. On final landing it was designed to endure rocks about 31 cm (12 in) high, and it was hoped, but not guaranteed, that no out-sized boulders or craters would be encountered. On final contact, the lander was designed to handle slopes of up to 19 degrees and rocks up to 38 cm (15 in) in height.

The Opportunity rover was operating in the region and the two teams worked together to attempt to image the EDM on its descent, which, depending on conditions, might have been possible especially if the EDM "went long" in its landing ellipse. However, the rover's cameras had no view of the lander during its descent. It was the first time a surface probe attempted to image the landing of another vehicle from the surface of Mars. (Other spacecraft have imaged each other, especially orbiters viewing ones on the ground, and in 2005 Mars Global Surveyor imaged Mars Express in orbit around Mars.)

EDL summary (as planned):

Altitude		Speed		Event
121 km	75 mi	21,000 km/h	13,000 mph	Enter atmosphere
45 km	28 mi	19,000 km/h	12,000 mph	Peak heating
11 km	6.8 mi	1,700 km/h	1,100 mph	Parachute deployed
7 km	4.3 mi	320 km/h	200 mph	Lower heat shield eject and doppler radar activated
1.2 km	0.75 mi	240 km/h	150 mph	Upper heat shield and parachute ejected
1.1 km	0.68 mi	250 km/h	160 mph	Retro-rockets on
2 m	6.6 ft	4 km/h	2.5 mph	Retro-rockets off
0 m	0 ft	10 km/h	6.2 mph	Touch down on crumple bumper underneath spacecraft

Contact was lost with the module 50 seconds before the planned touch-down. By 21 October 2016, after studying the data, ESA said it was likely that things went wrong when the parachute released early, the engines then turned on but then turned off after too short a time.

== Crash ==
The Schiaparelli lander attempted an automated landing on 19 October 2016, but the signal was unexpectedly lost a short time before the planned landing time. ESA's Mars Express and NASA's Mars Reconnaissance Orbiter (MRO) and MAVEN continued listening for the lander's signal to no avail.

Schiaparelli transmitted about 600 megabytes of telemetry during its landing attempt, and detailed analysis found that its atmospheric entry occurred normally, with the parachute deploying at 12 km (7.5 mi) and 1,730 km/h (1,070 mph), and its heat shield releasing at 7.8 km (4.8 mi). However, the lander's inertial measurement unit, which measures rotation, became saturated (unable to take higher readings) for about one second. This saturation, coupled with data from the navigation computer, generated an altitude reading that was negative, or below ground level. This caused the premature release of the parachute and back shell. The braking thrusters then fired for about three seconds rather than the expected 30 seconds, followed by the activation of ground systems as if the vehicle had already landed. In reality, it was still at an altitude of 3.7 km (2.3 mi). The lander continued transmitting for 19 seconds after the thrusters cut off; the loss of signal occurred 50 seconds before it was supposed to land. Schiaparelli impacted the Martian surface at 300 km/h (190 mph), near terminal velocity.

MRO Context Camera images of Schiaparelli landing site; before (29 May 2016) and after (20 October 2016). The large black spot indicates the impact by the lander, and the white spot its parachute.

A day after the attempted landing, the Context Camera of NASA's MRO identified new ground markings due to the lander's impact and parachute. The crash site is about 54 km (~33.5 miles) from where the active NASA Mars rover Opportunity was at the time of the landing. On 27 October 2016, ESA released high resolution images of the crash site taken by the MRO HiRISE camera on 25 October 2016. The front heatshield, module impact site, and the rear heat-shield and parachute are identified. It is thought that the crater is about half a metre (yard) deep and it may be possible to further study this crater at a later time. On a related note, an artificially made crater was actually the goal of the THOR mission proposed under the Mars Scout program that produced Phoenix and MAVEN, the goal was sub-surface excavation. That mission was passed over, but another orbiter was able to discover naturally occurring fresh impact craters, and ice was found in them.

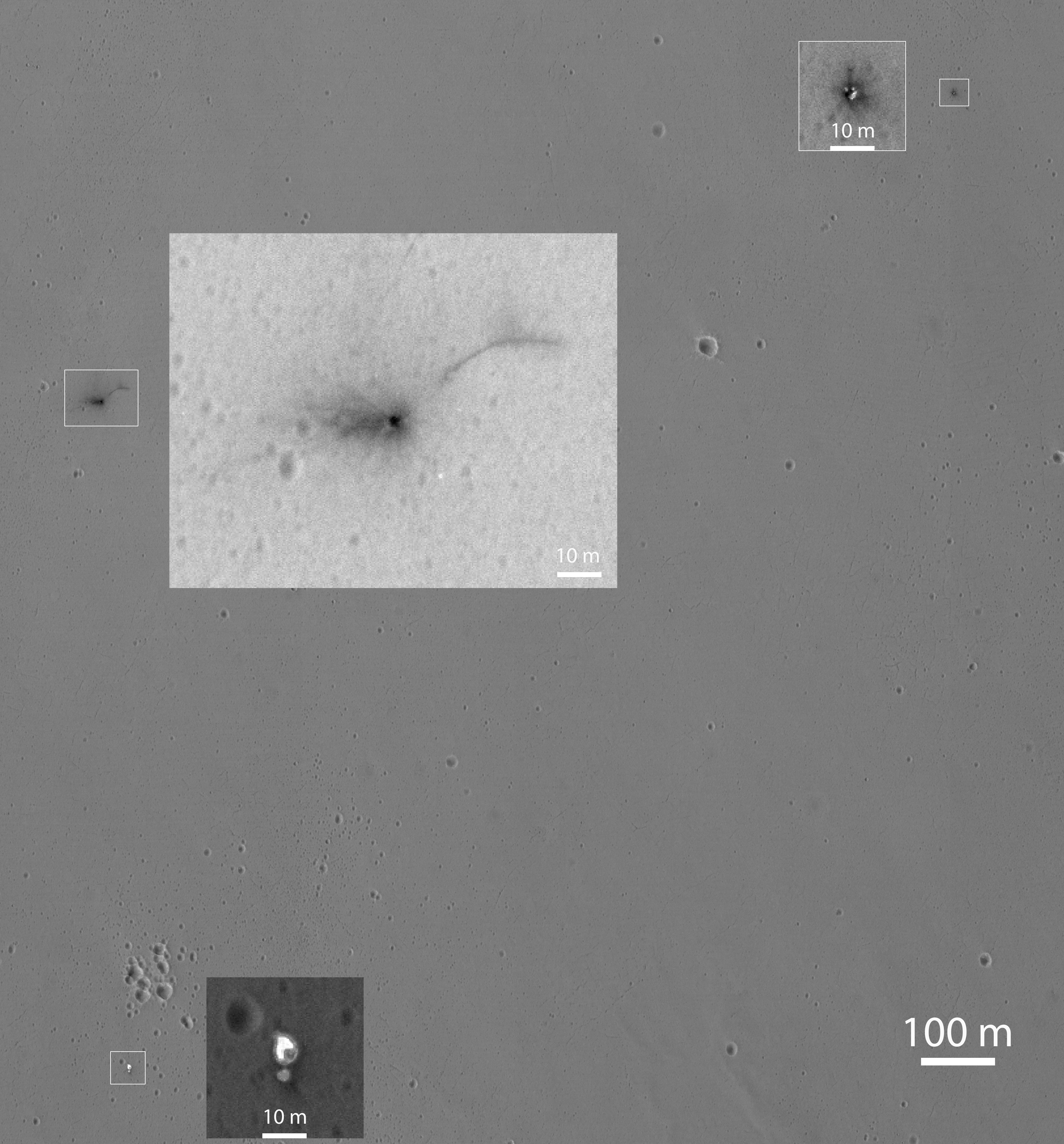
MRO HiRISE image of Schiaparelli impact area taken on 25 October 2016. Blown up in the images are areas identified as lander impact (center left), front heat shield impact (upper right), and parachute and rear heat shield (lower left)

EDL Demonstration Module
Task	Evaluation
Separation manoeuvre	Yes
Hibernation on/off	Yes
Hypersonic atmospheric entry	Yes
Parachute deployed	Yes
Heat shield ejected	Yes
Parachute and back shell ejection	Premature
Retro rockets turn on	Premature
Retro rockets turn off	Premature

Although the lander crashed, ESA officials declared Schiaparelli a success because it had fulfilled its primary function of testing the landing system for the then-planned 2020 Kazachok lander and returning telemetry data during its descent. By 20 October, the bulk of the descent data had been returned to Earth and was being analysed. Unlike the Beagle 2 lander, which was not heard from again after being released from Mars Express in 2003, the Exomars module transmitted during descent so data collected and transmitted on the way down was not lost when the spacecraft was destroyed on impact.

== Investigation into cause of the crash ==
An investigation that concluded in May 2017 identified four "root causes for the mishap [...]: Insufficient uncertainty and configuration management in the modelling of the parachute dynamics which led to expect much lower dynamics than observed in flight; Inadequate persistence time of the IMU [Inertial Measurement Unit] saturation flag and inadequate handling of IMU saturation by the GNC [Guidance Navigation and Control]; Insufficient approach to Failure Detection, Isolation and Recovery and design robustness; Mishap in management of subcontractors and acceptance of hardware."

The board of inquiry's investigation revealed that at the time that the lander deployed its parachute it began spinning unexpectedly fast. This superfast rotation briefly saturated Schiaparelli's spin-measuring instrument, which resulted in a large attitude-estimation error by the guidance, navigation and control-system software. This resulted in the computer calculating that it was below ground level, triggering the early release of the parachute and backshell, a brief firing of the thrusters for only 3 seconds instead of 30 seconds, and the activation of the on-ground system as if Schiaparelli had landed. The inquiry also determined that "[t]he mission would not have been jeopardised by the attitude knowledge error induced by IMU [Inertial Measurement Unit] saturation, if the persistence time would have been set at a lower value."

Images of module's crash site suggested that a fuel tank may have exploded in the impact. It is estimated that the lander impacted the surface at about 300 km/h (83 m/s; 190 mph). Additional imaging of the site by November further confirmed the identity of the spacecraft's parts. The additional imaging was in colour and it was noted that parachute was slightly shifted.

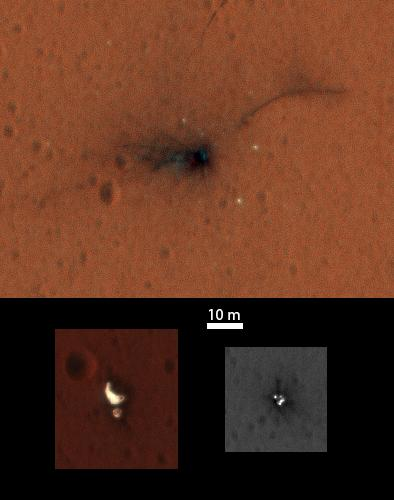
HiRISE observations of the crash site on 1 November 2016, detailing what is thought to be the main spacecraft's impact location, the lower heat shield, and upper heat shield and parachute. With this second observation, it is noted that wind seems to have shifted the parachute, and some of bright spots around the crash zone were confirmed to be from material not image noise or momentary reflections.

By taking more images using a technique called super-resolution reconstruction (SRR) the resolution can be improved, and this was done for the formerly lost Beagle 2 probe. Two other benefits to more images is that is easier to discern between image noise such as cosmic ray hits and real objects, and among bright spots high albedo objects versus momentary specular reflections. Finally, with multiple images over time, movement and changes, such as the wind blowing a parachute can be observed.

== Instrument and sensor payload ==
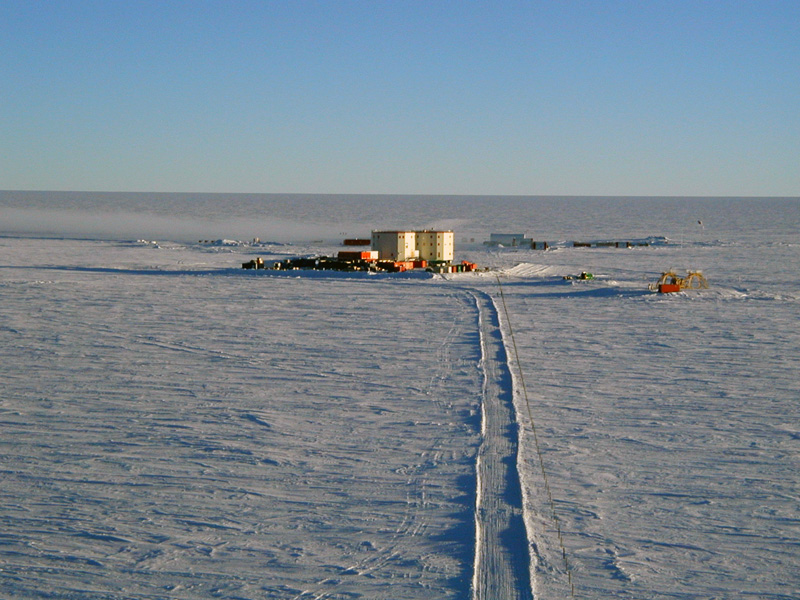
Concordia research station is another mission that supports development of an ESA human mission to Mars, supporting the Aurora Exploration Programme. Atmospheric electricity is one of the concerns for a human missions to Mars and Schiaparelli might have provided the first ever measurement of this property on Mars.

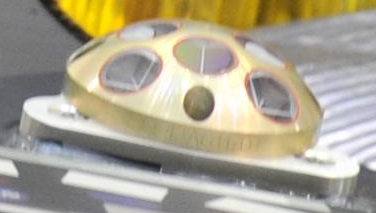
INRRI was included on the InSight Mars lander. It is seen here on InSight's deck in preparation for launch.

The primary mission goal was to test the landing systems, including the parachute, Doppler radar altimeter, hydrazine thrusters, etc. The secondary mission goal was scientific. The lander was to measure the wind speed and direction, humidity, pressure and surface temperature, and determine the transparency of the atmosphere. The surface science payload was called DREAMS, and was designed to obtain meteorological data for a few days after landing, as well as make the first measurements of atmospheric electricity on Mars.

A descent camera (DECA) was included in the payload. Its captured images were to be transmitted after landing. AMELIA, COMARS+, and DECA collected data during the entry, descent, and landing for about six minutes. Much of this data was transmitted while it was descending. Although EDL portion was designed to last literally a few minutes, and the surface observations at most a few days, one instrument, INRRI, was a passive laser retro-reflector that could be used as long as possible, even decades later, for laser range-finding of the lander.

INRRI was mounted to the top (zenith) side of the lander, to enable spacecraft above to target it. Its mass was about 25 grams, and it was contributed by the Italian Space Agency (ASI). The design used a cube corner reflector to return incoming laser light. The cubes are made of fused silica which are mounted to an aluminum support structure. INRRI was also mounted to the InSight Mars lander.

Summary of the science-technology payload

- DREAMS (Dust Characterization, Risk Assessment, and Environmental Analyser on the Martian Surface)
  - MetWind (wind detection)
  - DREAMS-H (humidity detection)
  - DREAMS-P (pressure detection)
  - MarsTem (temperature detection)
  - Solar Irradiance Sensor (transparency of the atmosphere)
  - Micro-ARES (atmospheric electricity detector)
- AMELIA (Atmospheric Mars Entry and Landing Investigation and Analysis)
- DECA (Descent Camera)
- COMARS+ (Combined Aerothermal Sensor Package)
  - Measured heat during Mars atmospheric entry.
- INRRI (INstrument for landing – Roving laser Retroreflector Investigations)
  - Compact laser retro-reflector for detecting the lander by laser-ranging

=== DREAMS ===
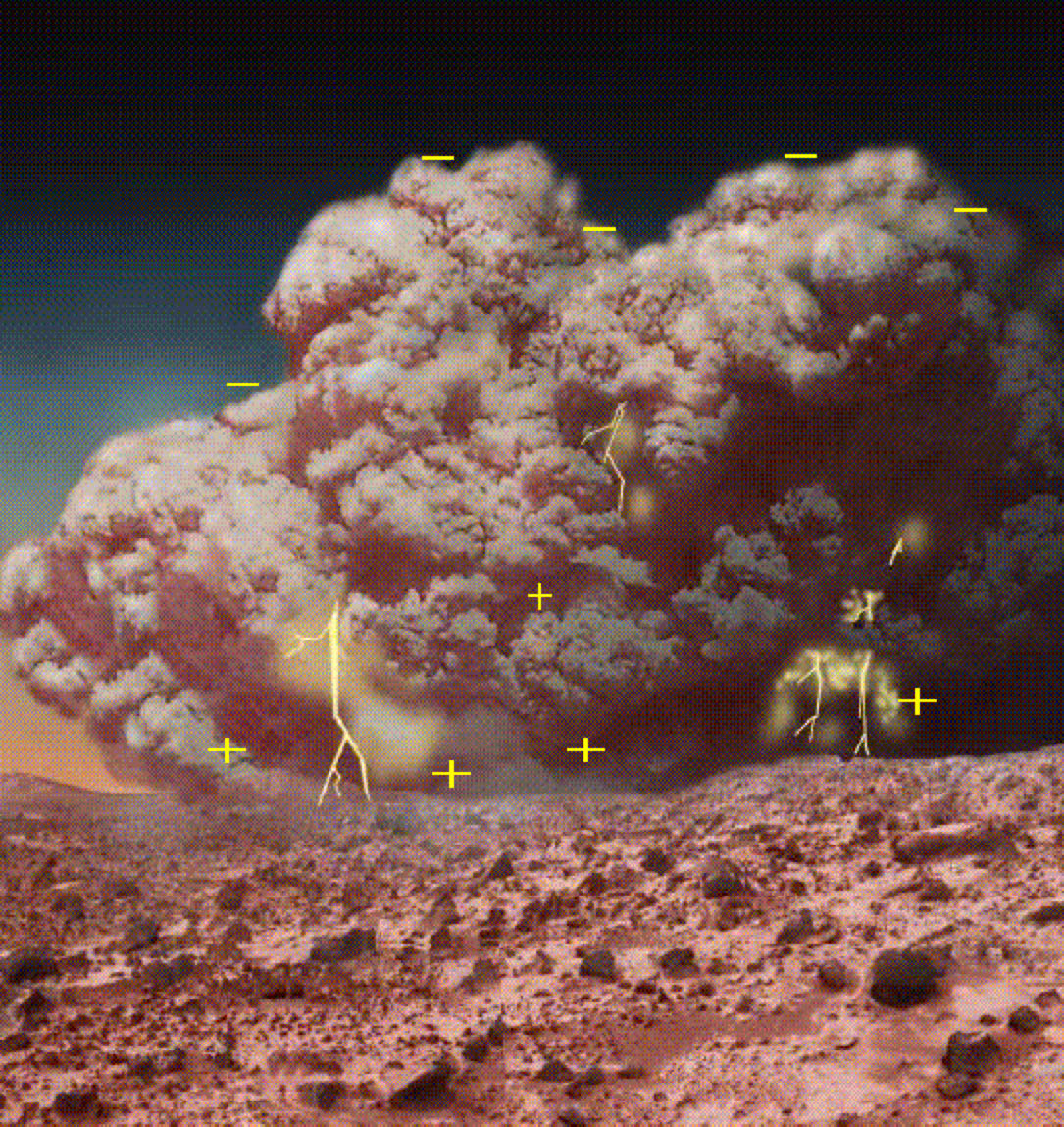
This artist's concept illustrates an electrically active dust storm on Mars, which may have produced chemicals that caused the inconclusive Viking lander life-detection experiment results. Schiaparelli was aiming to measure atmospheric electricity during the Mars dust storm season.

Animated image of a dust devil on Mars

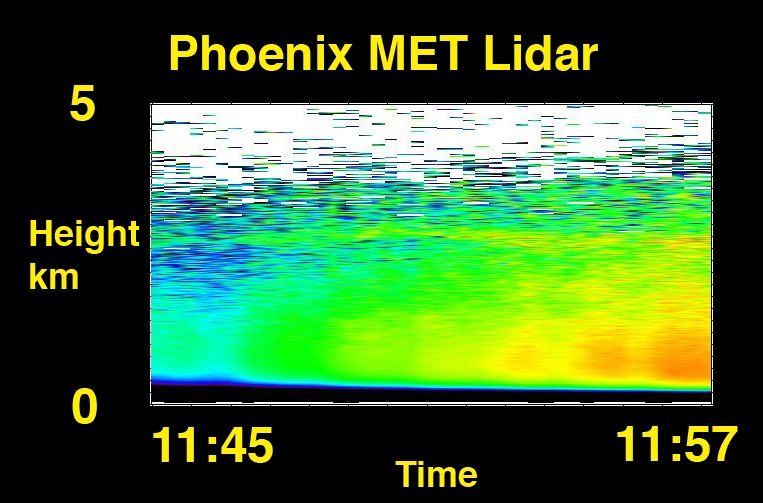
The Phoenix lander took these measurements of atmospheric dust with LIDAR in 2008

The lander's scientific payload for the surface was the meteorological DREAMS (Dust Characterization, Risk Assessment, and Environment Analyser on the Martian Surface) package, consisting of a suite of sensors to measure the wind speed and direction (MetWind), humidity (MetHumi), pressure (MetBaro), surface temperature (MarsTem), the transparency of the atmosphere (Solar Irradiance Sensor – SIS), and atmospheric electrification (Atmospheric Relaxation and Electric-field Sensor – Micro-ARES). The institutions that contributed to the DREAMS science payload include INAF and CISAS from Italy, LATMOS from France, ESTEC from the Netherlands, FMI from Finland, and INTA from Spain.

The DREAMS payload was intended to function for 2 to 8 Mars days as an environmental station for the duration of the surface mission after landing. The planned lander arrival was made to coincide with the Mars global dust storm season and collect data on a dust-loaded Mars atmosphere. DREAMS had been hoped to provide new insights into the role of electric forces on dust lifting, the mechanism that initiates dust storms. In addition, the MetHumi sensor was intended to complement MicroARES measurements with critical data about humidity, to enable scientists to better understand the dust electrification process.

Atmospheric electricity on Mars is still unmeasured, and its possible role in dust storms and atmospheric chemistry remains unknown. It has been speculated that atmospheric electricity may have played a role in the inconclusive results from the Viking lander life experiments, which were positive for metabolizing microbial life, but no organic compounds were detected by the mass spectrometer. The two favored possible explanations are reactions with hydrogen peroxide or ozone created by ultraviolet light or atmospheric electrical processes during dust storms.

DREAMS-P was a pressure sensor and DREAMS-H was for humidity; the sensors feed a single data-handling circuit board.

In addition to the surface payload, a camera called DECA (Descent Camera) on the lander operated during the descent. It was intended to deliver additional context information and exact location data in the form of images. DECA is a reflight of the Visual Monitoring Camera (VMC) of the Planck and Herschel mission.

Another surface experiment that was focused on dust was the Materials Adherence Experiment on the Mars Pathfinder lander, about twenty years prior to ExoMars.

=== Descent Camera ===
The Descent Camera (DECA) was intended to capture about 15 downward-looking views as it approached the surface of Mars. It was to begin acquiring images after the lower heat shield was ejected. This camera had a 60 degree field of view to capture greyscale images, to support technical knowledge of the descent. DECA was a flight spare of the visual monitoring camera of the Herschel Space Observatory and Plank mission that were launched together. The camera dimensions are 9 cm (3.5 in) squared, with a mass of 0.6 kg (1.3 lb). The DECA descent camera data were stored during descent and not meant to be relayed to Earth until after landing, so these images were lost in the crash. The purpose of this transfer delay was to protect the spacecraft and data from electrostatic discharges. DECA was designed and built in Belgium by Optique et Instruments de Précision (OIP).

The main goals for DECA included:

- image landing area
- measure transparency of the Martian atmosphere,
- collect data for 3-D topography of landing area

=== Preliminary results ===
Because the Schiarapelli demonstrator lander transmitted during its descent, a great deal of telemetry was successfully returned. About 600 megabytes of data, amounting to about 80% of telemetry, were relayed to Earth were used to investigate the failure modes of the landing technology employed.

== Specifications ==
Note about masses: on the Mars surface the gravity is less than on Earth, so the weight is 37% of the Earth weight.

Diameter	2.4 m (7.9 ft) with heatshield; 1.65 m (5.4 ft) without heatshield
Height	1.8 m (5.9 ft)
Mass	577 kg (1,272 lb) total; 280 kg (620 lb) lander on the surface; 45 kg (99 lb) hydrazine; 80 kg (180 lb) heat shield; 20 kg (44 lb) rear heat shield
Heat shield material	Norcoat Liège
Structure	Aluminium sandwich with carbon fiber reinforced polymer skins
Parachute	Disk-gap-band canopy, 12 m (39 ft) diameter
Propulsion	3 clusters of 3 hydrazine pulse engines, 400 N (90 lb_{f}) each; Astrium CHT-400 rocket engines
Power	Non-rechargeable battery
Communications	UHF link with the ExoMars Trace Gas Orbiter or other compatible communication systems.

This diagram compares the Trace Gas Orbiter with Schiaparelli EDM attached in its entry cone with the Mars Express orbiter.

=== Power systems ===
At one point, Roscosmos offered to contribute a 100 watt radioisotope thermoelectric generator (RTG) power source for the EDM lander to allow it to monitor the local surface environment for a full Martian year, but because of complex Russian export control procedures, it later opted for the use of a non-rechargeable electric battery with enough power for 2 to 8 sols. Solar panels were also considered when a longer mission (1–2 months) supported by a heavier, more complex, lander was under consideration. By the 2010s the focus was on executing a short-lived (a few days surface time) technology demonstration, with an emphasis on landing systems.

Schiaparelli is unusual by carrying only non-rechargeable batteries, so its active life will be limited to only a few Martian days. This is because its primary objective is to demonstrate entry, descent and landing technologies.

— ESA, 2016

=== Communication systems and network ===
Schiaparelli had a UHF radio to communicate with Mars orbiters. The lander had two antennae, one on the back shell and one on the lander. When the back shell is ejected, it can transmit from the spiral antenna on body of the lander. When an orbiter can communicate with the lander depends on where it is in its orbit, and not all orbiters could record or talk with lander because the globe of Mars blocks the line of sight to the lander. The ExoMars TGO could also communicate with it using the UHF system. The EDM "woke up" from hibernation about 90 minutes prior to landing, and transmitted continuously for 15 minutes prior to landing.

During its landing, the EDM signal was monitored at Mars by the Mars Express orbiter, and remotely by the Giant Metrewave Radio Telescope in Pune, India. Mars Express also communicates with other landers and rovers using its Melacom communication system. The Mars Reconnaissance Orbiter (MRO) overflew the landing two hours after landing, and was available to check for signals from Schiaparelli. The ExoMars TGO could also communicate with it using the UHF system.

The communication system standard at Mars is the Electra radio, in use since the arrival of the Mars Reconnaissance Orbiter in 2006. Prior to this, several orbiters used a first generation UHF relay system, including Mars Global Surveyor, Mars Odyssey, and Mars Express. Using orbiters to relay data from Mars landers and rovers is noted for its energy efficiency.

On 19 October 2016 it took 9 minutes and 47 seconds for a radio transmission to travel at roughly the speed of light from Mars to Earth. So even though the radio array at Pune listened in "real time", the entire EDL sequence, which would take about 6 minutes, had already occurred even as it was being recorded as starting to enter the atmosphere. There is a tiny bit of variation because the speed of light is slowed down by the air of Mars and Earth (see Refractive index).

=== Computing ===
The Schiaparelli lander has two main computers, one is called the Central Terminal & Power Unit (CTPU) and housed in a warm box on top, and the other computer is called the Remote Terminal & Power Unit (RTPU) and is on the underside of the lander. Overall, the CTPU handles surface operations and the RTPU handles entry and descent, and is actually destroyed on final landing with surface because it is on the underside. When the Trace Gas Orbiter and Entry Demonstrator Module are connected, the RTPU handles the interface and sends power from the orbiter to the module. When it disconnects from the orbiter, then it must run off its internal batteries. The CTPU uses a LEON central processor based on Sun Microsystems' RISC-based SPARC processor architecture, and also has RAM, PROM, and a timer. The CTPU also handles data sent to the UHF radio communication system. When the lander disconnects from the orbiter, it spends most of its time in a low-power hibernation mode while it coasts through space before entering the Martian atmosphere. The lander must coast through space for about 3 days by itself before landing, meanwhile the orbiter has to do a Mars orbit insertion. The DECA descent camera data is not downloaded to the computer for relay to Earth until after landing, and it is not transmitted during descent.

=== Parachute ===
A disk-band-gap parachute was deployed by a pyrotechnic mortar. The full-scale 12m diameter canopy was tested by Vorticity in the largest wind tunnel in the world, located at NASA Ames, as part of its development..

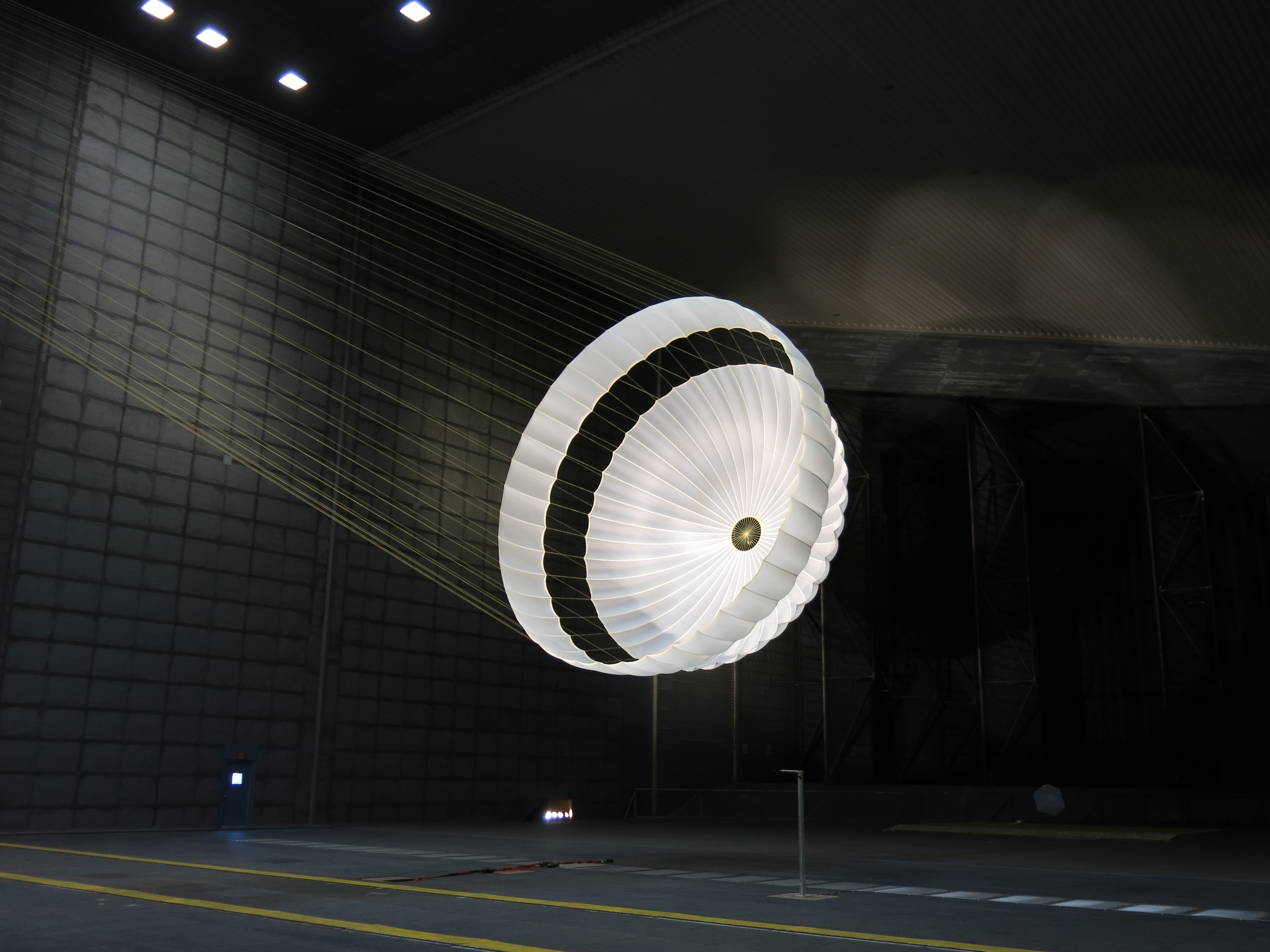
ExoMars Schiaparelli 12m DGB parachute testing conducted by Vorticity in the wind tunnel at NASA AMES

A sub-scale parachute was tested by Vorticity in Earth's atmosphere in 2011; it was ascended by balloon to 24.5 kilometers altitude and then released, and the pyrotechnic deployment systems was tested after a period of free-fall. On 19 October 2016 the parachute was successfully deployed on Mars.

In the summer of 2019, problems with the parachute for the next tranche of the project occurred during testing, despite the EDM technology test; the issues with the parachute system may delay that phase.

=== Retro-rockets ===
Schiaparelli module has 3 sets of three thrusters, nine total, that operate starting at about 1 km (half a mile) up in pulse mode, slowing the spacecraft from 70 to 4 m/s (252 to 14 km/h). Each of the nine engines is a CHT-400 rocket engine that can produce 400 Newtons of thrust. These rocket engines are fueled by three spherical 17.5 liter tanks holding hydrazine propellant. The tanks hold about 15–16 kilograms of hydrazine (about 34 pounds, 2.4 stones) of fuel per tank, or 46 kg overall (101 pounds or 7.24 stones). The propellant is pressurized by helium, held in a single tank containing 15.6 liters at a pressure of 170 bar (2465 psi). The thrusters shut down 1–2 meters/yards from the surface, after which the crumple zone underneath the lander handles the final stop. Data from a timer, doppler radar, and inertial measurement unit are merged in the lander's computers to control the operation of the thrusters.

== Impact on ExoMars ==
A possible "shutdown" moment for the next ExoMars mission was the ESA ministerial meeting in December 2016 which considered certain issues including €300 million of ExoMars funding and lessons learned from the ExoMars 2016 missions so far. One concern was the Schiaparelli crash, as this landing system was to be used for the ExoMars 2020 mission consisting of the Rosalind Franklin rover delivered by the instrumented 2020 Kazachok lander.

The ExoMars team has been praised for "putting a brave face" on what happened and being positive about the EDM's very credible return on its prime mission: data about entry, descent, and landing, despite the crash.

Another positive was the development of the demonstrator module as part of the overall grand plan for ExoMars, which meant that the landing technologies underwent a real-world test before carrying more valuable cargo.

A preliminary report on the malfunction was presented at the December 2016 ESA ministerial meeting. By December the outcome was known: ExoMars would go on being financially supported by the ESA. €436 million ($464 million) was authorized to finish the mission.

After the many challenging, difficult and rewarding moments of 2016, this is a great relief and a fine result for European space exploration, ..

— ESA ExoMars project manager

== Glossary ==
- ASI: Agenzia Spaziale Italiana
- EDL: Entry, descent and landing
- EDM: EDL Demonstrator Module
- ESA: European Space Agency
- ESTEC: European Space Research and Technology Centre
- GMT: Greenwich Mean Time
- INAF: Istituto Nazionale di Astrofisica
- NASA: National Aeronautics and Space Administration
- Roscosmos: the Russian national space programme
- TGO: Trace Gas Orbiter
- UKSA: United Kingdom Space Agency

== See also ==
- Beagle 2 – Failed Mars lander launched in 2003
- Huygens (spacecraft) – First spacecraft to land on Titan
- List of missions to Mars
- List of spacecraft powered by non-rechargeable batteries
- Mars landing – Landing of a spacecraft on the surface of Mars
- Hayabusa2 – Japanese space mission to asteroid Ryugu
- Philae (spacecraft) – Robotic European Space Agency lander that accompanied the Rosetta spacecraft
