= Pioneer Venus project =

Two NASA spacecraft sent to Venus in 1978

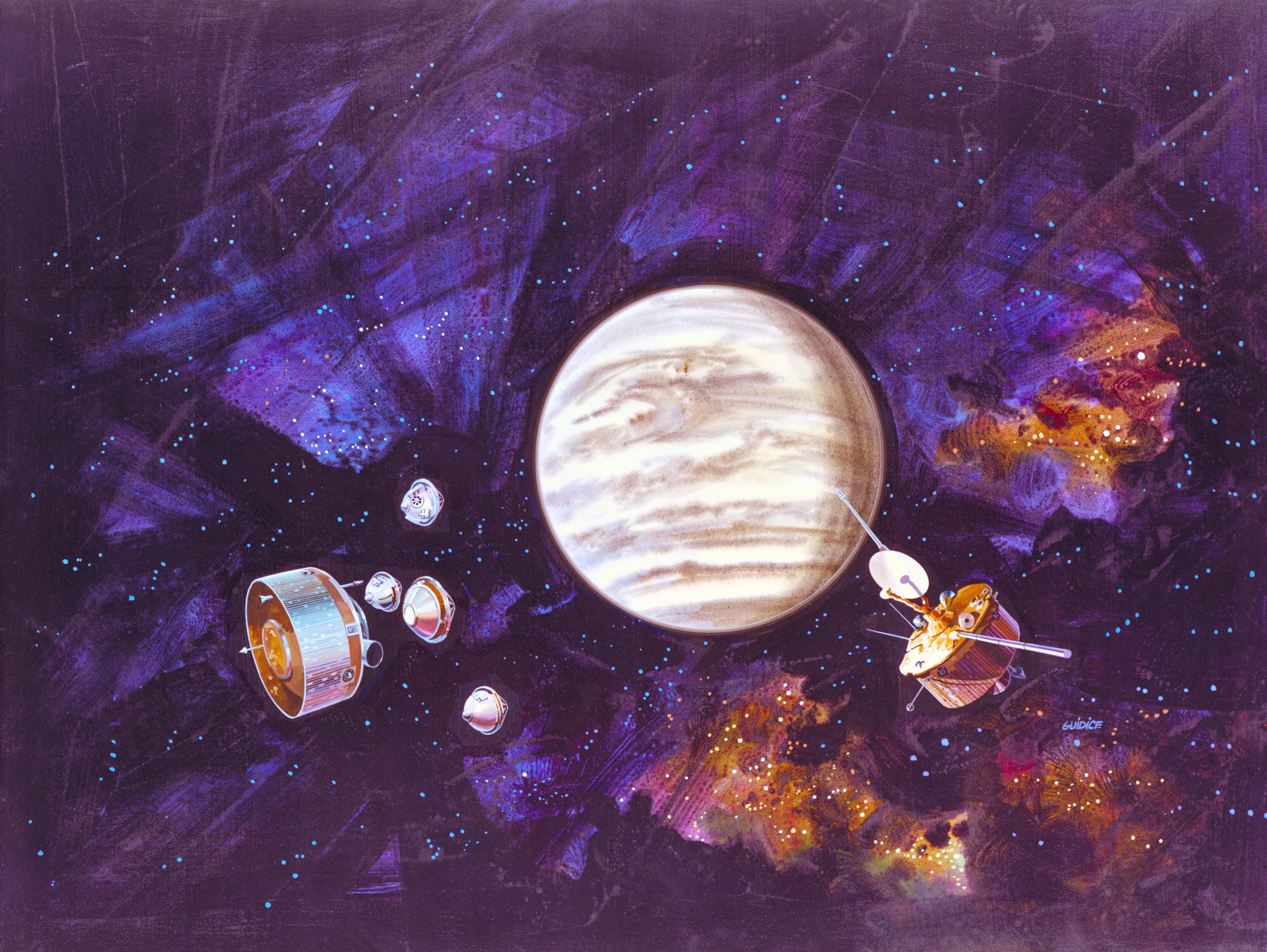
Arrival of the Pioneer Venus spacecraft at Venus

The Pioneer Venus project was part of the Pioneer program consisting of two spacecraft, the Pioneer Venus Orbiter and the Pioneer Venus Multiprobe, launched to Venus in 1978. The program was managed by NASA's Ames Research Center.

The Pioneer Venus Orbiter entered orbit around Venus on December 4, 1978, and performed observations to characterize the atmosphere and surface of Venus. It continued to transmit data until October 1992.

The Pioneer Venus Multiprobe deployed four small probes into the Venusian atmosphere on December 9, 1978. All four probes transmitted data throughout their descent to the surface. One probe survived the landing and transmitted data from the surface for over an hour.

== Overview ==
The Pioneer mission consisted of two components, launched separately: an orbiter and a multiprobe.

=== Orbiter ===
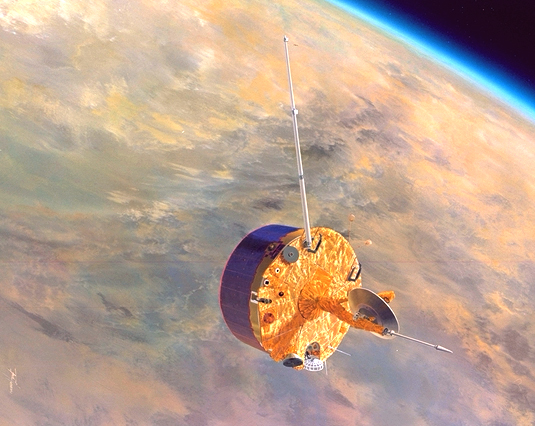
Pioneer Venus Orbiter

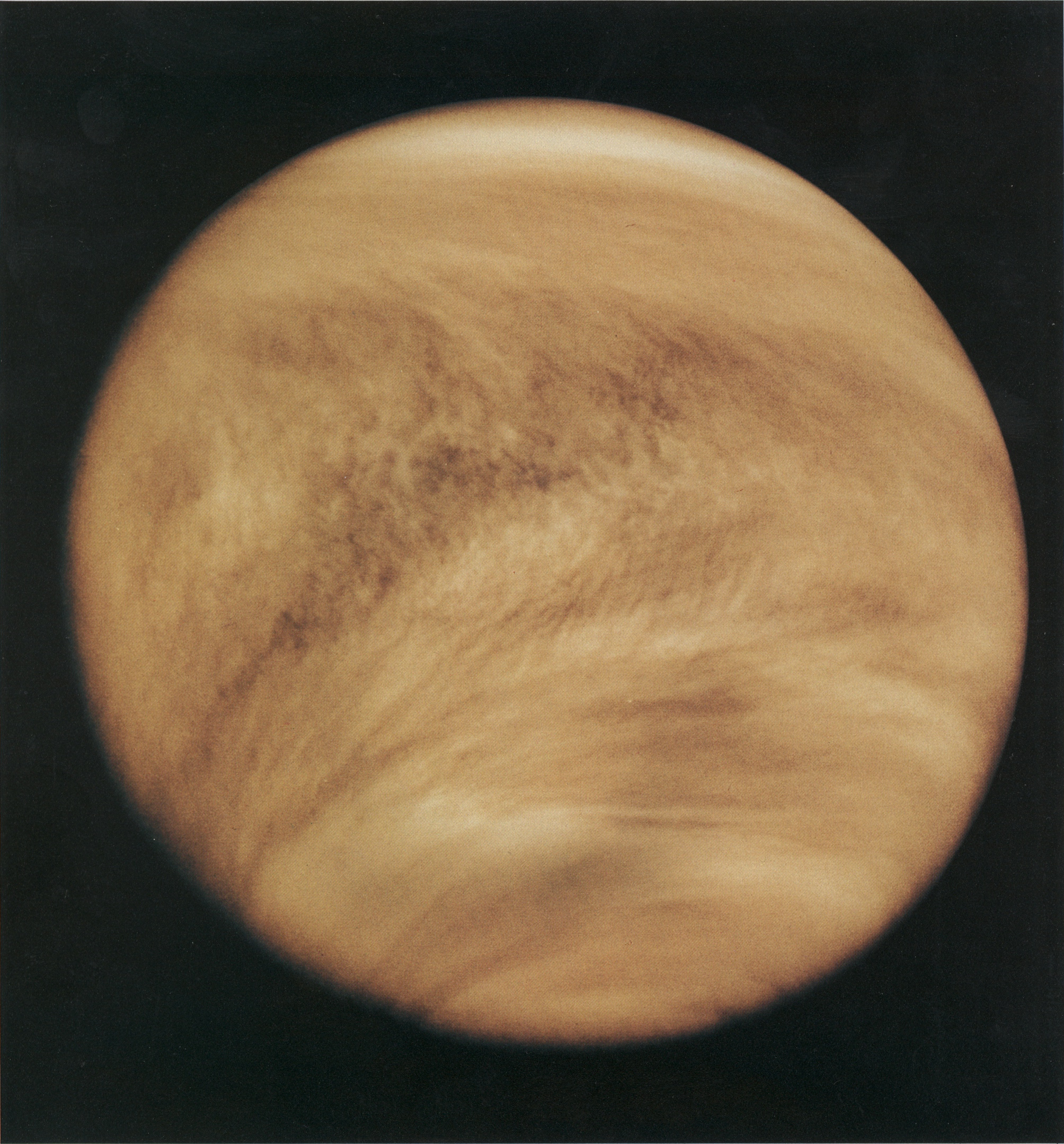
Cloud structure in the Venusian atmosphere in 1979, revealed by ultraviolet observations by Pioneer Venus Orbiter

The orbiter was launched on May 20, 1978 on an Atlas-Centaur rocket. The orbiter's mass was 517 kg (1,140 lb). The Pioneer Venus Orbiter was inserted into an elliptical orbit around Venus on December 4, 1978. It carried 17 experiments (with a total mass of 45 kg):

- a cloud photopolarimeter to measure the vertical distribution of the clouds
- a surface radar mapper to determine topography and surface characteristics
- an infrared radiometer to measure IR emissions from the Venus atmosphere
- an airglow ultraviolet spectrometer to measure scattered and emitted UV light
- a neutral mass spectrometer to determine the composition of the upper atmosphere
- a solar wind plasma analyzer to measure properties of the solar wind
- a magnetometer to characterize the magnetic field at Venus
- an electric field detector to study the solar wind and its interactions
- an electron temperature probe to study the thermal properties of the ionosphere
- an ion mass spectrometer to characterize the ionospheric ion population
- a charged particle retarding potential analyzer to study ionospheric particles
- two radio science experiments to determine the gravity field of Venus
- a radio occultation experiment to characterize the atmosphere
- an atmospheric drag experiment to study the upper atmosphere
- a radio science atmospheric and solar wind turbulence experiment
- a gamma ray burst detector to record gamma-ray burst events

In May 1992 the orbiter began the final phase of its mission, in which the periapsis was held between 150 and 250 km until the fuel ran out and atmospheric entry destroyed the spacecraft in August 1992.

=== Multiprobe ===
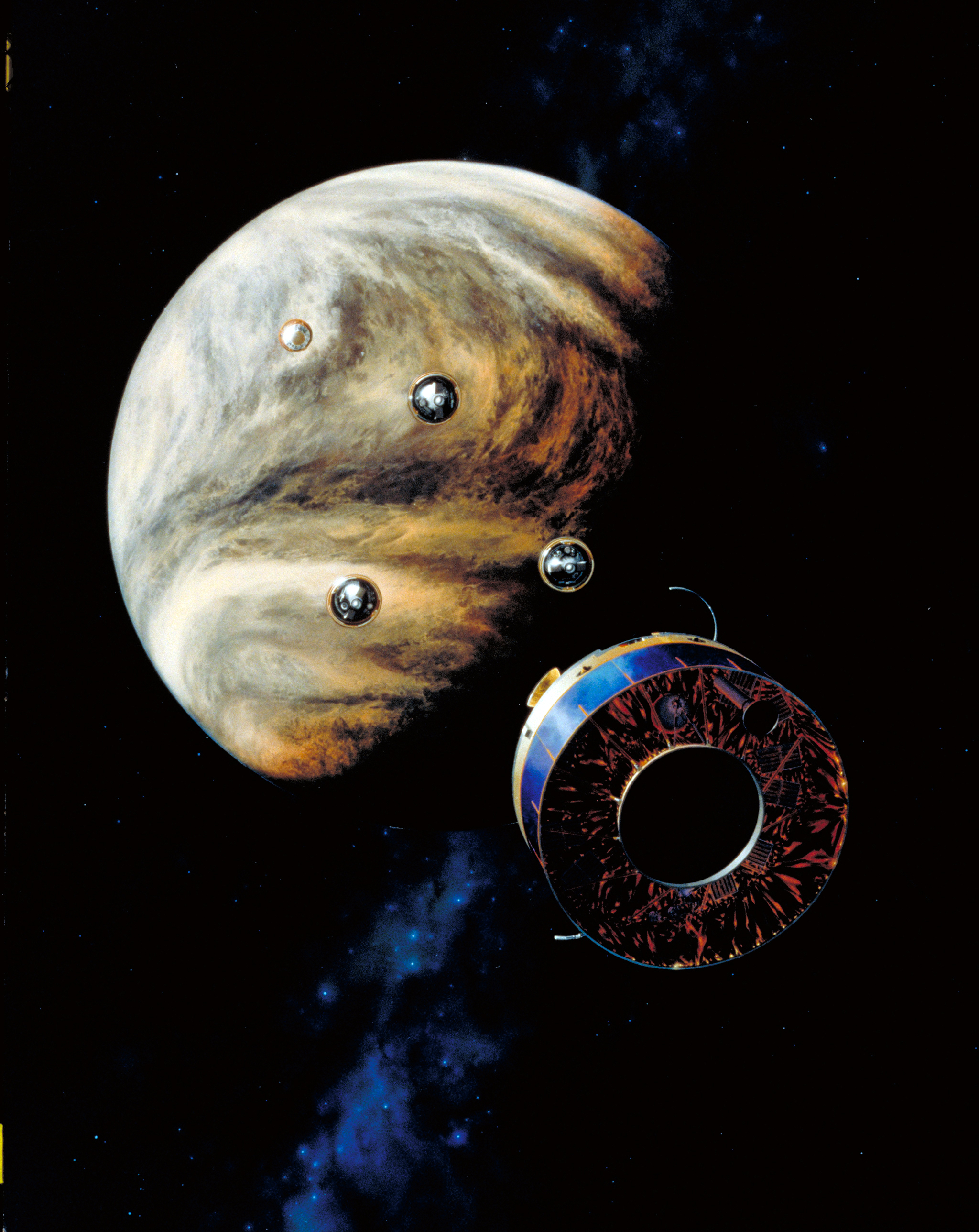
Pioneer Venus Multiprobe bus and atmospheric probes

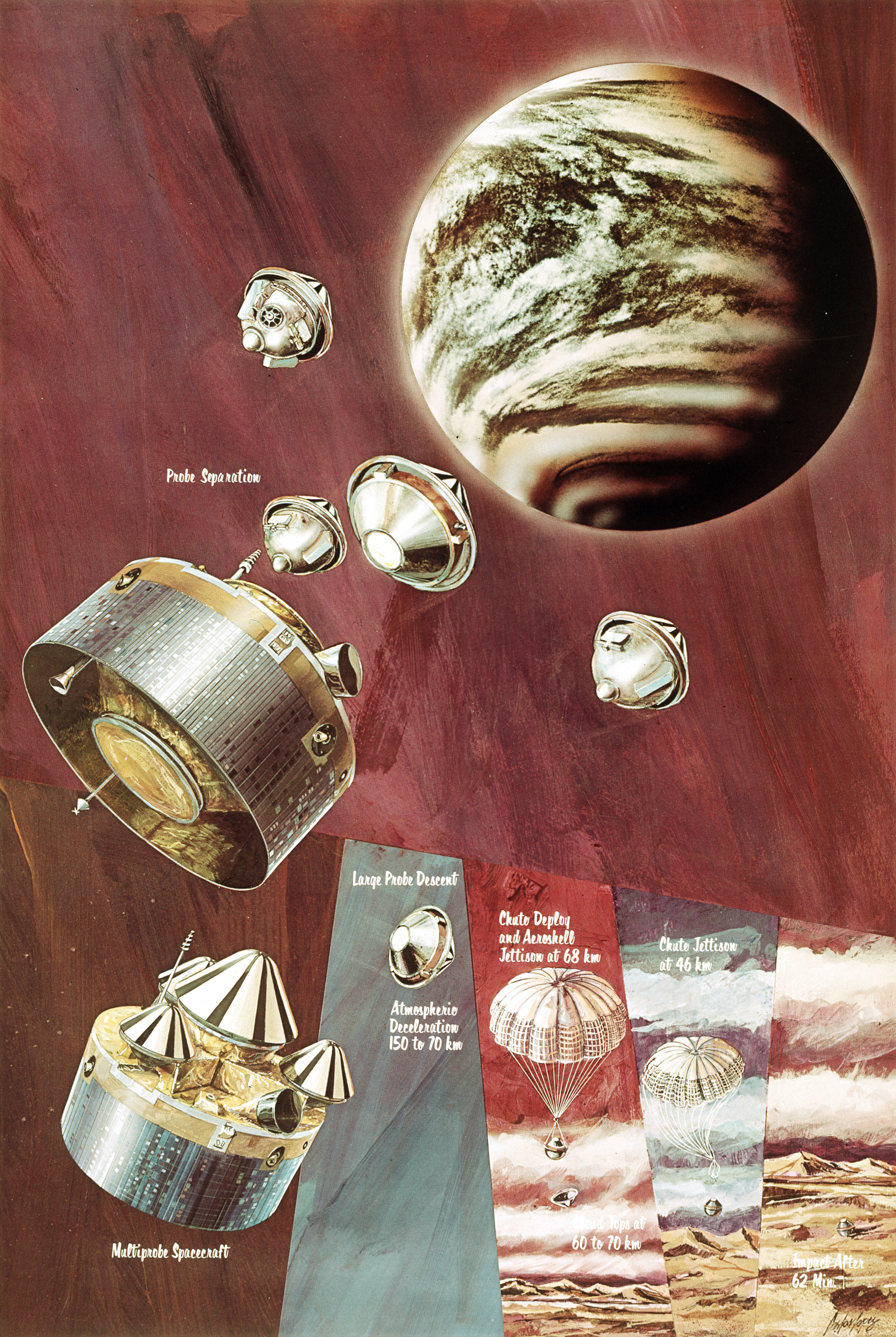
Pioneer Venus Multi-Probe

The Pioneer Venus Multiprobe was launched on August 8, 1978 on an Atlas-Centaur rocket. It consisted of a 290 kg bus which carried one large (315 kg) and three small atmospheric probes. The large probe was released on November 16, 1978 and the three small probes on November 20. All four probes entered the Venus atmosphere on December 9, followed by the bus.

The Pioneer Venus large probe was about 1.5 m in diameter and equipped with 7 science experiments. After deceleration from initial atmospheric entry at about 11.5 km/s, a parachute was deployed at 47 km altitude. The probe stopped broadcasting when it impacted the surface. The science experiments were:

- a neutral mass spectrometer to measure the atmospheric composition
- a gas chromatograph to measure the atmospheric composition
- a solar flux radiometer to measure solar flux penetration in the atmosphere
- an infrared radiometer to measure distribution of infrared radiation
- a cloud particle size spectrometer to measure particle size and shape
- a nephelometer to search for cloud particles
- temperature, pressure, and acceleration sensors

The three small probes were identical to each other, 0.8 m in diameter and 90 kg each small probe. The small probes were each targeted at different parts of the planet; They had no parachutes and the aeroshells did not separate from the probe. Two of the small probes reached the surface, and one of these, the day probe, continued to broadcast for 67 minutes and 37 seconds after reaching the surface.

The Pioneer Venus bus also carried two experiments, a neutral mass spectrometer and an ion mass spectrometer to study the composition of the atmosphere. With no heat shield or parachute, the bus made measurements only to about 110 km altitude before burning up.

== See also ==
- 1978 in spaceflight
- Vega program
- Venera program
