= Solar wind turbulence =

Solar wind turbulence refers to the complex, chaotic fluid motions and magnetic field fluctuations observed in the solar wind plasma as it flows outward from the Sun. This turbulence plays a key role in heating the solar wind and accelerating charged particles throughout the heliosphere.

Solar wind turbulence displays both magnetohydrodynamic (MHD) and kinetic plasma behaviors. It exhibits Kolmogorov-like power spectra at fluid scales, and shows strong Alfvénic correlations between velocity and magnetic field fluctuations, especially in fast solar wind. It evolves with distance from the Sun as the wind expands.

The turbulence can be broadly categorized into:

- Large-scale Alfvénic fluctuations originating from the Sun
- Actively evolving turbulent cascade transferring energy to smaller scales
- Small-scale kinetic processes where the fluid approximation breaks down

Observations from spacecraft like Helios, Ulysses, and Wind have revealed that solar wind turbulence properties vary between:

- Fast vs. slow solar wind streams
- Different heliographic latitudes
- Various distances from the Sun

Current research focuses on the relative roles of waves vs. structures, evolution of turbulent properties with solar wind expansion, and kinetic processes at small scales where energy dissipates.
