= Fay-Riddell equation =

Relation in aerospace engineering

The Fay-Riddell equation is a fundamental relation in the fields of aerospace engineering and hypersonic flow, which provides a method to estimate the stagnation point heat transfer rate on a blunt body moving at hypersonic speeds in dissociated air. The heat flux for a spherical nose is computed according to quantities at the wall and the edge of an equilibrium boundary layer.

$\dot{q}_{w} = 0.763 \cdot \text{Pr}^{-0.6} (\rho_{e} \mu_{e})^{0.4} (\rho_{w} \mu_{w})^{0.1} \sqrt{ \left( \frac{du_{e} }{dx} \right)_{s} } (h_{0,e} - h_{w}) \left[ 1 + ( \text{Le}^{0.52} - 1 ) \left( \frac{ h_{D} }{ h_{0,e} } \right) \right]$

where $\text{Pr}$ is the Prandtl number, $\text{Le}$ is the Lewis number, $h_{0,e}$ is the stagnation enthalpy at the boundary layer's edge, $h_{w}$ is the wall enthalpy, $h_{D}$ is the enthalpy of dissociation, $\rho$ is the air density, $\mu$ is the dynamic viscosity, and $(du_{e}/dx)_{s}$ is the velocity gradient at the stagnation point. According to Newtonian hypersonic flow theory, the velocity gradient should be:
$$\left( \frac{du_{e} }{dx} \right)_{s} = \frac{1}{R} \sqrt{ \frac{2(p_{e} - p_{\infty})}{\rho_{e}} }$$
where $R$ is the nose radius, $p_{e}$ is the pressure at the edge, and $p_{\infty}$ is the free stream pressure. The equation was developed by James Fay and Francis Riddell in the late 1950s. Their work addressed the critical need for accurate predictions of aerodynamic heating to protect spacecraft during re-entry, and is considered to be a pioneering work in the analysis of chemically reacting viscous flow.

== Assumptions ==
The Fay-Riddell equation is derived under several assumptions:

1. Hypersonic Flow: The equation is applicable for flows where the Mach number is significantly greater than 5.
2. Continuum Flow: It assumes the flow can be treated as a continuum, which is valid at higher altitudes with sufficient air density.
3. Thermal and Chemical Equilibrium: The gas is assumed to be in thermal and chemical equilibrium, meaning the energy modes (translational, rotational, vibrational) and chemical reactions reach a steady state.
4. Blunt Body Geometry: The equation is most accurate for blunt body geometries where the leading edge radius is large compared to the boundary layer thickness.

== Extensions ==
While the Fay-Riddell equation was derived for an equilibrium boundary layer, it is possible to extend the results to a chemically frozen boundary layer with either an equilibrium catalytic wall or a noncatalytic wall.
$$\dot{q}_{w} = 0.763 \cdot \text{Pr}^{-0.6} (\rho_{e} \mu_{e})^{0.4} (\rho_{w} \mu_{w})^{0.1} \sqrt{ \left( \frac{du_{e} }{dx} \right)_{s} } \times
\begin{cases}
(h_{0,e} - h_{w}) \left[ 1 + ( \text{Le}^{0.63} - 1 ) \left( \frac{ h_{D} }{ h_{0,e} } \right) \right], & (\text{Equilibrium Catalytic}) \\
\left( 1 - \frac{ h_{D} }{ h_{0,e} } \right), & (\text{Noncatalytic})
\end{cases}$$

== Applications ==
The Fay-Riddell equation is widely used in the design and analysis of thermal protection systems for re-entry vehicles. It provides engineers with a crucial tool for estimating the severe aerodynamic heating conditions encountered during atmospheric entry and for designing appropriate thermal protection measures.

== See also ==
- Aerodynamic heating
- Atmospheric entry
- Hypersonic flight
- Stagnation point
