= Hard landing =

Landing of aircraft or spacecraft with greater speed and force than in a normal landing

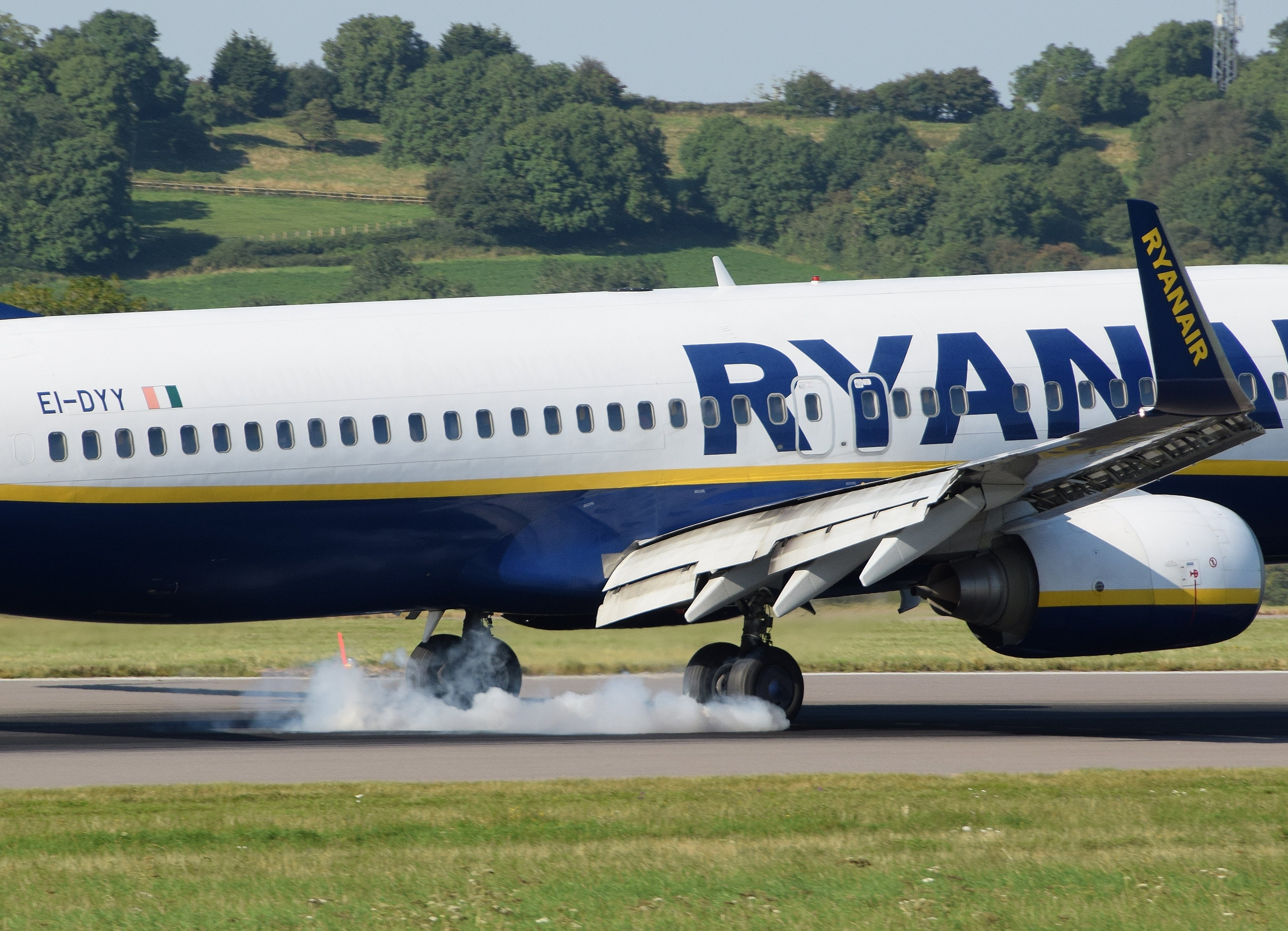
A Ryanair Boeing 737-800 performing a firm landing at Bristol Airport following Boeing's manual

A hard landing occurs when an aircraft or spacecraft hits the ground with a significantly greater vertical speed and force than in a normal landing. The terms hard landing and firm landing are often confused though are inherently different. A hard landing is never intended; if an aircraft has had a hard landing it must be inspected for damage before its next flight. A firm landing for an aircraft type (e.g. Boeing 737) and specified environmental conditions (e.g. gusty or crosswind conditions, wet runway, etc.) is intended, and even required, by the aircraft manual.

Landing is the final phase in flight, in which the aircraft returns to the ground. The average vertical speed in a landing is around two metres per second (6.6 ft/s). Crew judgment is most reliable to determine hard landing, as determination based on recorded acceleration value is difficult and not advisable, partially because there is no recording of true vertical acceleration.

Hard landings can be caused by weather conditions, mechanical problems, overweight aircraft, pilot decision, or pilot error. The term hard landing usually implies that the pilot still has total or partial control over the aircraft and is aware of the terrain proximity, as opposed to an uncontrolled descent into terrain or a controlled flight into terrain, both of which can be called crashes. Hard landings can vary in their consequences, from mild passenger discomfort to aircraft damage, structural failure, injuries, and loss of life.

Hard landings can cause extensive damage to aircraft. For example, on 20 June 2012, a Boeing 767 of All Nippon Airways landed with such force that a large crease formed in the aircraft's skin.

When the final approach is not stabilised, it is recommended that the crew abort and go around; this was the recommendation of the Australian Transport Safety Bureau after investigating the hard landing of a Malaysia Airlines Airbus A330 at Melbourne Airport arriving from Kuala Lumpur on 14 March 2015.

For helicopters, a hard landing can occur after mechanical or engine damage or failure when the rotor(s) are still intact and free to turn. Autorotation, in which airflow over the rotors keeps them turning and provides some lift, can allow limited pilot control during descent. As an unpowered descent, it requires considerable pilot skill and experience to safely execute.

A hard landing of a spacecraft such as a rocket stage usually ends with its destruction and can be intentional or unintentional. When a high-velocity impact is planned (when its purpose is to study consequences of impact), the spacecraft is called an impactor. This is sometimes humorously referred to as lithobraking.

== See also ==
- Index of aviation articles
- Deadstick landing
- Emergency landing
- Forced landing
- Soft landing (rocketry)
