= Ballute =

Parachute-like braking device

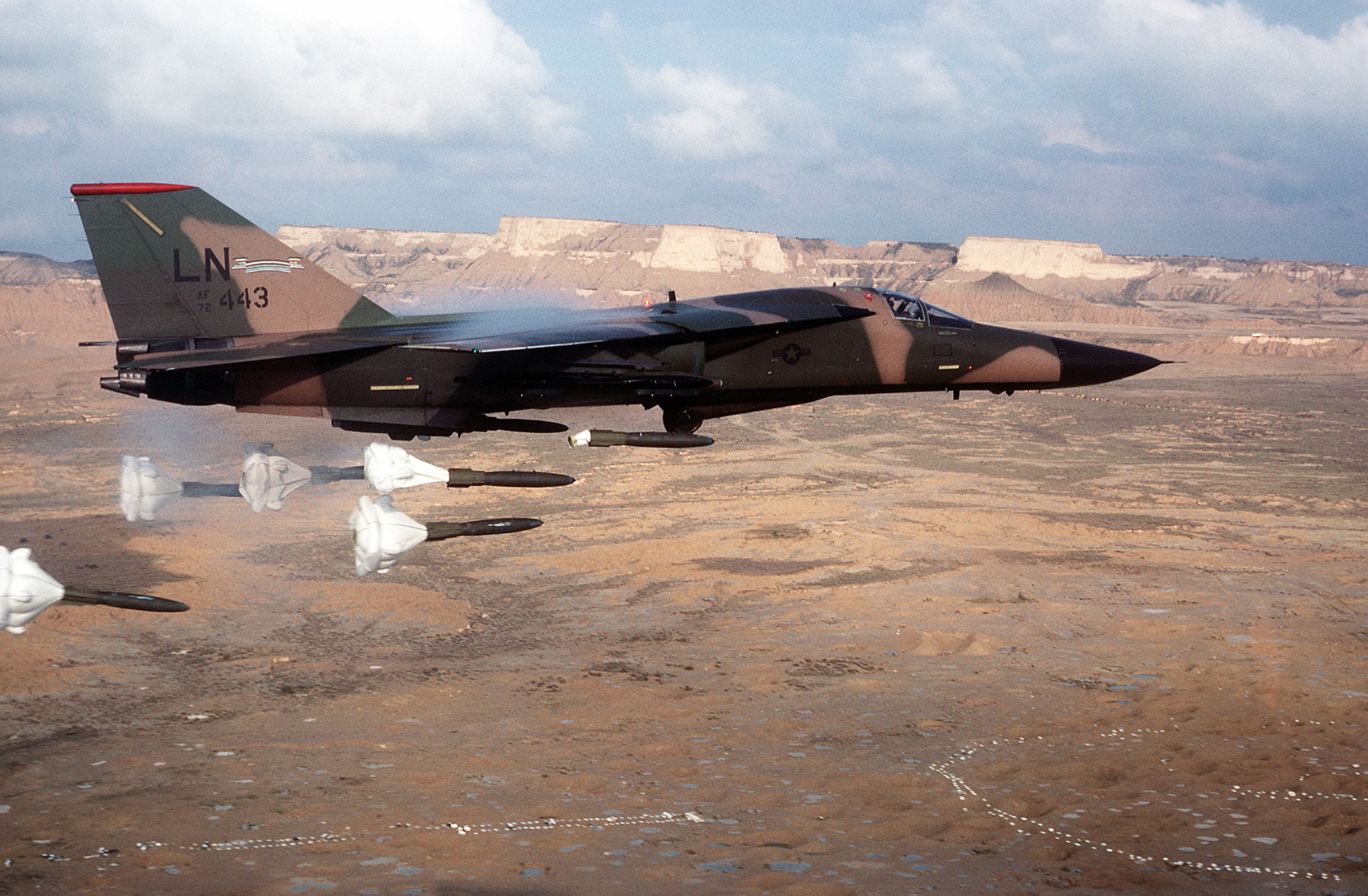
Ballute-equipped Mark 82 bombs, Mk-82AIRs, being dropped by an American F-111 attack aircraft

A ballute (a portmanteau of balloon and parachute) is a parachute-like braking device optimized for use at high altitudes and supersonic velocities.

The original ballute configuration was invented in 1958 by the Goodyear company. The innovation soon caught the attention of other organisations, including NASA; the agency incorporated ballutes into the escape system of the Gemini spacecraft. It has subsequently seen extensive use within the aerospace sector as a means of retarding the descent of various payloads, such as sections of rockets and atmospheric probes. Various proposals involving ballutes, such as for deorbiting/recovering low-mass satellites and interplanetary research programmes, have been issued in recent decades.

== Design ==
The ballute is an inflatable device used to generate drag. In terms of its basic configuration, it is a cone-shaped balloon, featuring a toroidal burble fence (an inflated structure intended to ensure flow separation) that is fitted around its widest point. The burble fence acts to stabilize the ballute as it decelerates through different flow regimes, typically descending from faster (even supersonic) flows into subsonic speeds. The design of the ballute, particularly its drop-like shaping, make it more suitable for decelerating at extreme speeds than a conventional parachute.

Sketch of ballute components

Ballutes can be categorised into three primary configurations, these being cocoon ballutes that enclose their payloads, attached ballutes that attach directly to the base of their payloads, and towed ballutes that trail after their payloads. The isotensoid ballute has been recognised as the standard configuration, although other arrangements have been tested. It has been proposed that ballutes could be arranged in both stacked toroidal and tension cone form factors. Some ballute configurations are specialised to certain purposes or industries, such as the aerospace sector.

By attaching a ballute to an air-dropped object, such as a bomb or an aerospace payload, it should (provided it is of sufficient size and has correctly deployed) limit its rate of descent, potentially minimising damage to the payload on contact with the ground. They can generate a relatively high amount of drag for their mass, making them attractive in weight-constrained scenarios typical to aerospace applications.

Inflation of a ballute is typically achieved either by a gas generator or by external air being forced into the structure by an arrangement of ram air inlets. The design of the inflation mechanism is particularly critical to its successful application; if the inlets are too small or too few, the ballute will not maintain its shape and collapse, while excessive inlet flow likely results in overpressure and raising the risk of bursting. Accordingly, the ballute has to be precisely designed to conform with the environmental conditions it is to be exposed to; similarly, the deployment ought to be with similar care, such as in respect to timing. Improper deployment is likely to cause failure, as excessive deceleration forces risk snapping fixing points and tearing fabric; tangling is another potential risk.

== Applications ==
The ballute was originally developed in response to the instability of early supersonic parachutes, proving to be an attractive alternative.

The ballute has been used on freefall bombs dropped from an aircraft, helping to both retard and stabilise the descent.

The ballute has been extensively used through the aerospace industry. One of its earliest uses in the sector was as an element of the astronaut's launch escape equipment aboard NASA's Gemini spacecraft; it was also being used to slow down the descent of the Arcas, an early American rocketsondes, by the mid-1960s. During the 1960s, the agency performed detailed research into the ballute as an aerodynamic decelerator system on other planets, such as Mars.

In the 1984 film 2010: The Year We Make Contact, a ballute is used on the Leonov spacecraft to shield it from the effects of heating during aerobraking, allowing the Leonov to slow itself without expending fuel and establish an orbit around Jupiter's moon Io.

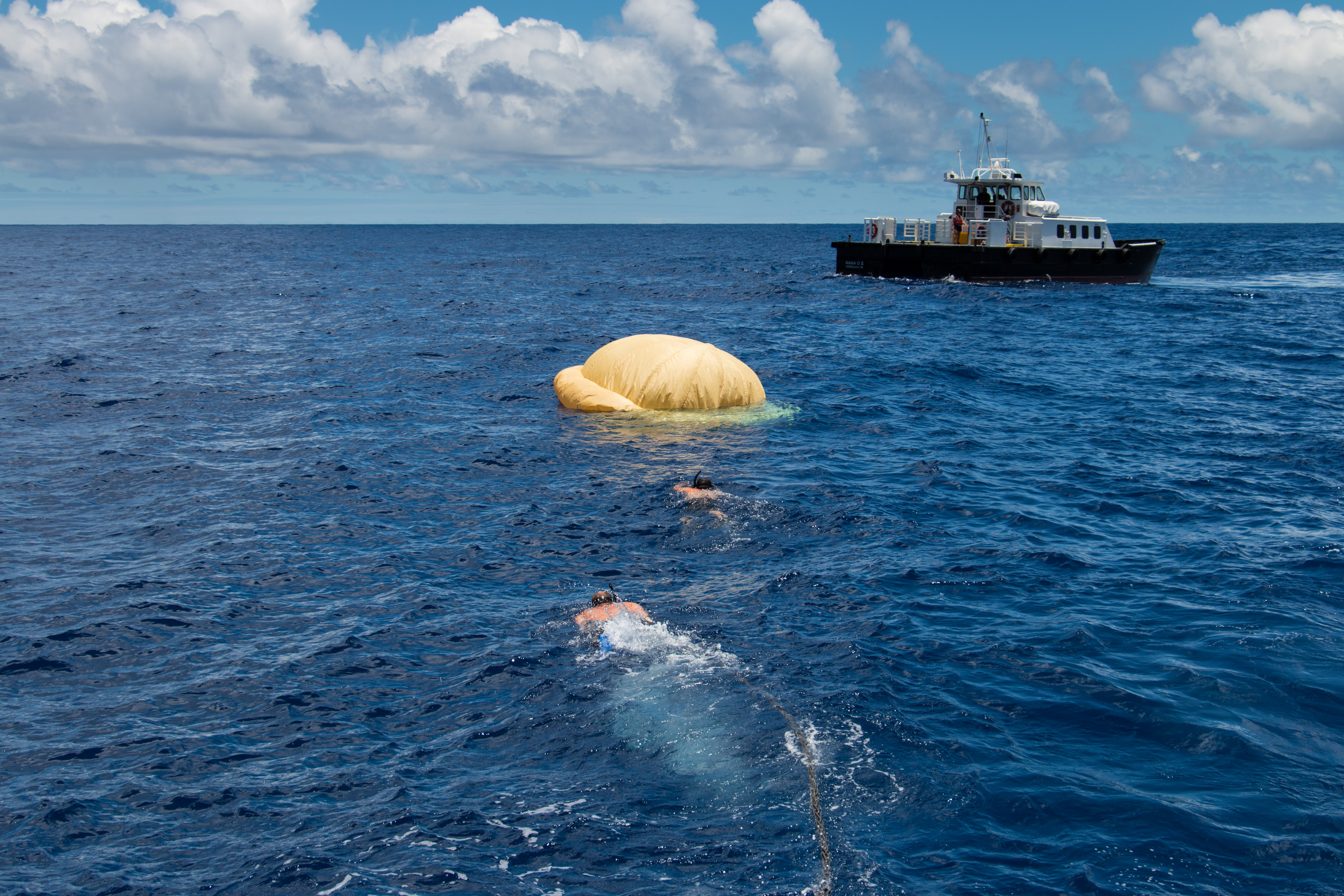
Recovery of a trailing ballute tested as a part of NASA's Low-density Supersonic Decelerator program

In 2000, NASA's Jet Propulsion Laboratory was researching the ballute, emphasising its potential for use in both aerocapture and aerobraking operations. Around that same period, the European Space Agency was also evaluating the use of inflatable shielding as a means of facilitating the controlled reentry of spacecraft.

Various proposed interplanetary atmospheric probes have incorporated ballutes; for envisioned missions to Venus, they shall act not only to control atmospheric entry but to provide buoyant support for the sensor payload as well. Landers on Mars may also use ballutes during direct atmospheric entry, while cocoon-style ballutes may also be adopted for orbital transfer vehicles in orbit around Earth. Particularly large ballutes may be used for planetary aerocapture purposes on various planetary bodies around the Solar System. Furthermore, extended designs using inflatable tension cone ballute technology have been proposed for deorbiting NanoSats and recovering low-mass (< 1.5 kg or 3.3 lb) satellites from low Earth orbit.

In early 2012, Armadillo Aerospace used a ballute during the testing of its STIG-A rocket. In February 2015, the Danish nonprofit aerospace organisation Copenhagen Suborbitals were engaged in testing a ballute for its Nexø rockets. In April 2018, Elon Musk tweeted that SpaceX would recover Falcon 9 second stages with the help of a "giant party balloon", after the company started landing the rocket's first stages routinely. However, the plan was called off. In August 2019, Peter Beck, founder and CEO of Rocket Lab, announced that they would attempt to recover their Electron rocket's lower stage utilising a ballute for supersonic deceleration, enabling the stage to be captured in mid-air by a helicopter.

== See also ==
- Index of aviation articles
