= Soft landing =

Landing that does not result in significant damage to the vehicle or its payload

A soft landing is any type of aircraft, rocket or spacecraft landing that does not result in significant damage to or destruction of the vehicle or its payload, as opposed to a hard landing. The average vertical speed of a soft landing (on Earth) should be about 2 meters (6.6 ft) per second or less.

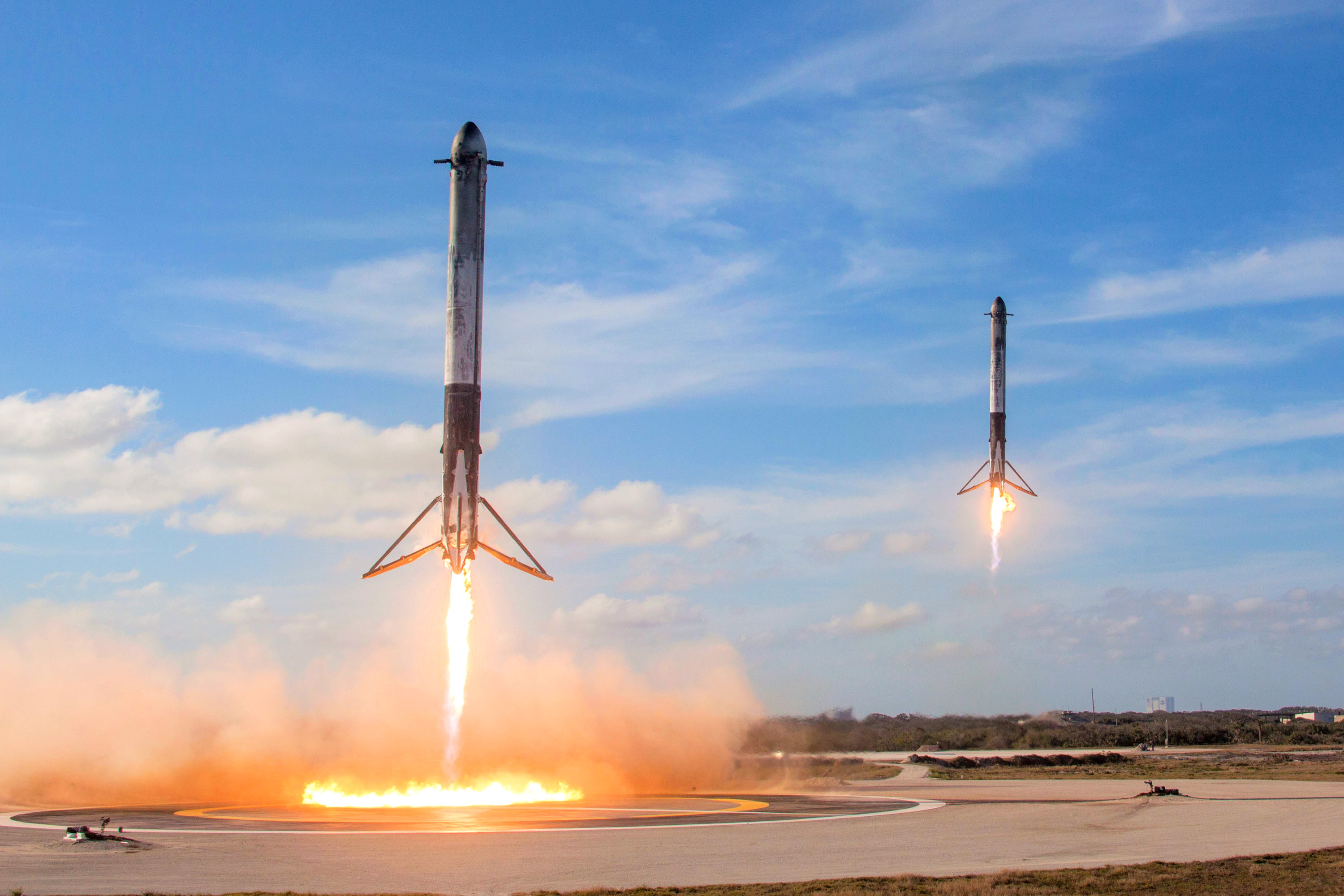
Two Falcon Heavy side boosters performing a Soft Landing via VTVL in 2018

A soft landing can be achieved by

- Parachute—often this is into water.
- Vertical rocket power using retrorockets, often referred to as VTVL (vertical landing referred to as VTOL, is usually for aircraft landing in a level attitude, rather than rockets) — first achieved on a suborbital trajectory by Bell Rocket Belt and on an orbital trajectory by the Surveyor 1.
- Horizontal landing, most aircraft and some spacecraft, such as the Space Shuttle, land this way accompanied with a parachute.
- Being caught in midair, as done with Corona spy satellites and followed by some other form of landing.
- Reducing landing speed by impact with the body's surface, known as lithobraking.

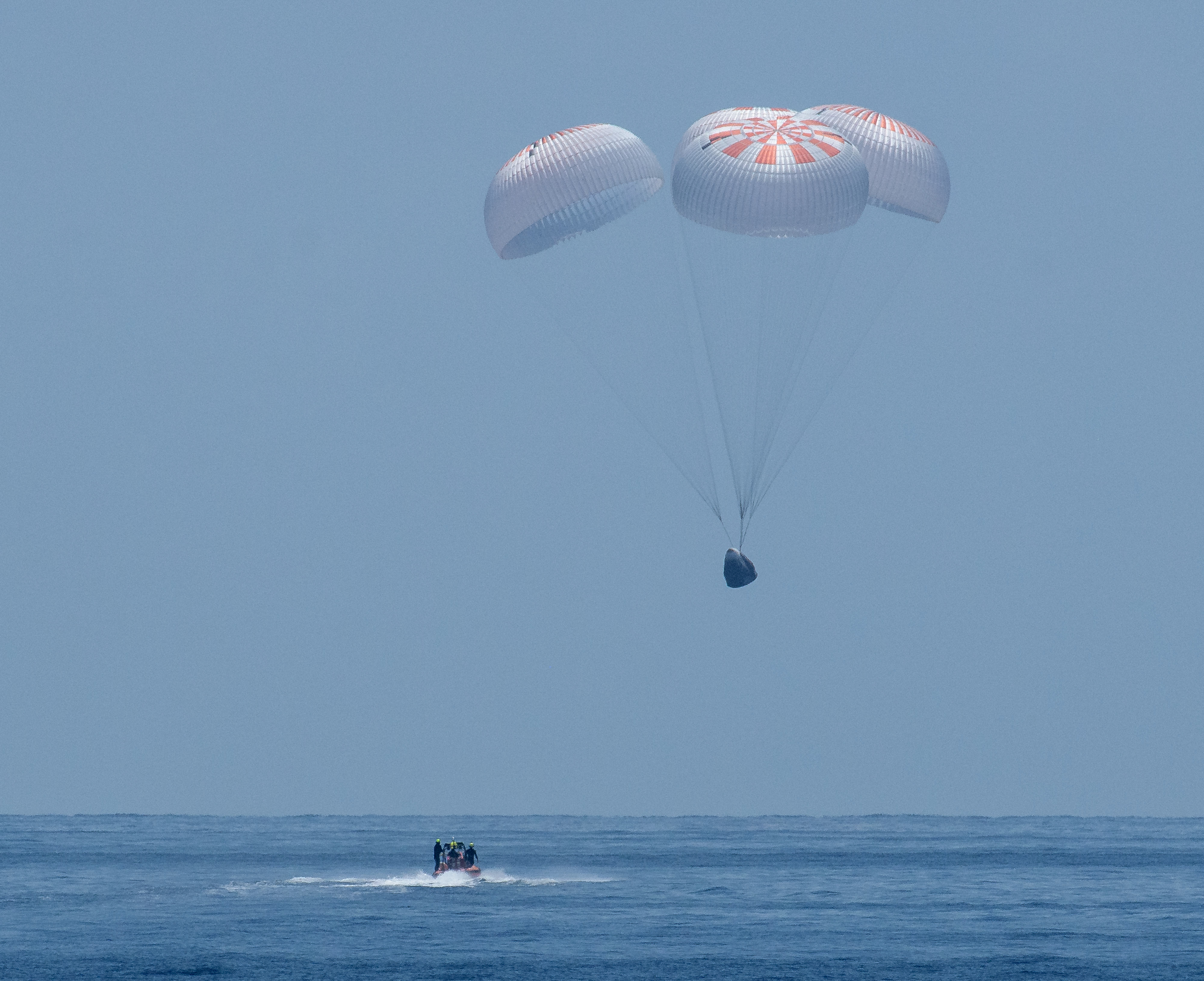
A SpaceX Crew Dragon capsule splashes down.

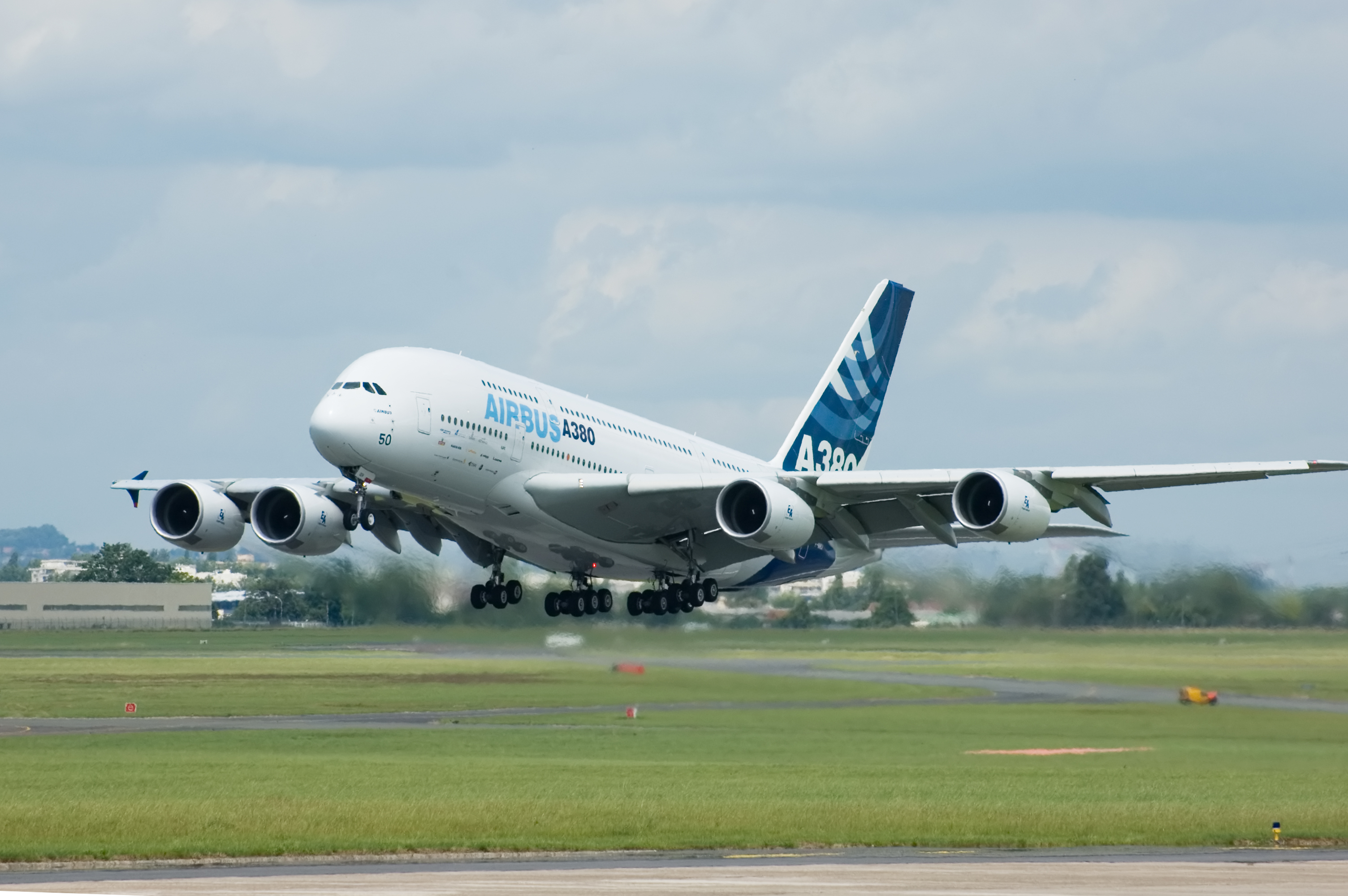
An Airbus A380 performing a soft landing at the Paris Air Show 2007

== See also ==
- List of landings on extraterrestrial bodies
