= Orbit insertion =

Spaceflight operation

In spaceflight an orbit insertion is an orbital maneuver which adjusts a spacecraft’s trajectory, allowing entry into an orbit around a planet, moon, or other celestial body, becoming an artificial satellite. An orbiter is a spacecraft designed for orbital insertion. An orbit insertion maneuver involves either deceleration from a speed in excess of the respective body's escape velocity, or acceleration to it from a lower speed.

When the result is a transfer orbit, e.g. a descent orbit insertion, the maneuver is an orbit injection.

== Orbit types ==
Orbits are periodic or quasi-periodic trajectories, usually around a central celestial body like the Earth or the Sun. They may also be trajectories around Lagrange point locations in a multi-body system like the Earth–Moon system. (For example, NASA used a halo orbit for the CAPSTONE mission.)

=== Low orbits ===
Low orbits are trajectories deep within the 'gravitational well' of a central body. Examples include low Earth orbit and low lunar orbit. Insertion into a low orbit can require substantial deceleration with respect to the central body or, for launch from a planetary surface, substantial acceleration to reach orbital speed.

=== High and elliptical orbits ===
Higher energy orbits like geostationary orbit are often reached via elliptical transfer orbits.

== Deceleration ==
One type of orbit insertion is used when capturing into orbit around a celestial body.

Rocket propulsion

Excess speed of an interplanetary transfer orbit is typically shed with a rocket firing known as an orbit insertion burn. For such a maneuver, the spacecraft's engine is used to slow its velocity relative to the target body. For example, each successful Apollo program lunar landing mission first used Apollo service module propulsion to enter low lunar orbit.

Low thrust insertion

For some arrival trajectories, low thrust propulsion is sufficient to achieve orbit insertion. The Hiten spacecraft used this approach first, in 1991.

Other techniques

Another technique, used when the destination body has a tangible atmosphere, is called aerocapture, which can use the friction of the atmospheric drag to slow down a spacecraft enough to get into orbit. This is very risky, however, and it has never been tested for an orbit insertion. Generally the orbit insertion deceleration is performed with the main engine so that the spacecraft gets into a highly elliptical “capture orbit” and only later the apocenter can be lowered with further decelerations, or even using the atmospheric drag in a controlled way, called aerobraking, to lower the apocenter and circularize the orbit while minimizing the use of onboard fuel. To date, only a handful of NASA and ESA missions have performed aerobraking (Magellan, Mars Reconnaissance Orbiter, Trace Gas Orbiter, Venus Express, ...).

== Acceleration ==
The second type of orbit insertion is used for newly launched satellites and other spacecraft. The majority of space launch vehicles used today can only launch a payload into a very narrow range of orbits. The angle relative to the equator and maximum altitude of these orbits are constrained by the rocket and launch site used. Given this limitation, most payloads are first launched into a transfer orbit, where an additional thrust maneuver is required to circularize the elliptical orbit which results from the initial space launch. The key difference between this kind of maneuver and powered trans-planetary orbit insertion is the significantly lesser change in velocity required to raise or circularize an existing planetary orbit, versus canceling out the considerable velocity of interplanetary cruise.

== Alternatives to rockets ==
Although current orbit insertion maneuvers require precisely timed burns of conventional chemical rockets, some headway has been made towards the use of alternative means of stabilizing orbits, such as ion thrusters or plasma propulsion engines to achieve the same result using less fuel over a longer period of time. In addition, research into the use of electrically conducting space tethers to magnetically repel the Earth's magnetic field has shown some promise, which would virtually eliminate the need for fuel altogether.

== See also ==
- Ballistic capture
