= Emergency landing =

Aircraft landing made in response to a crisis

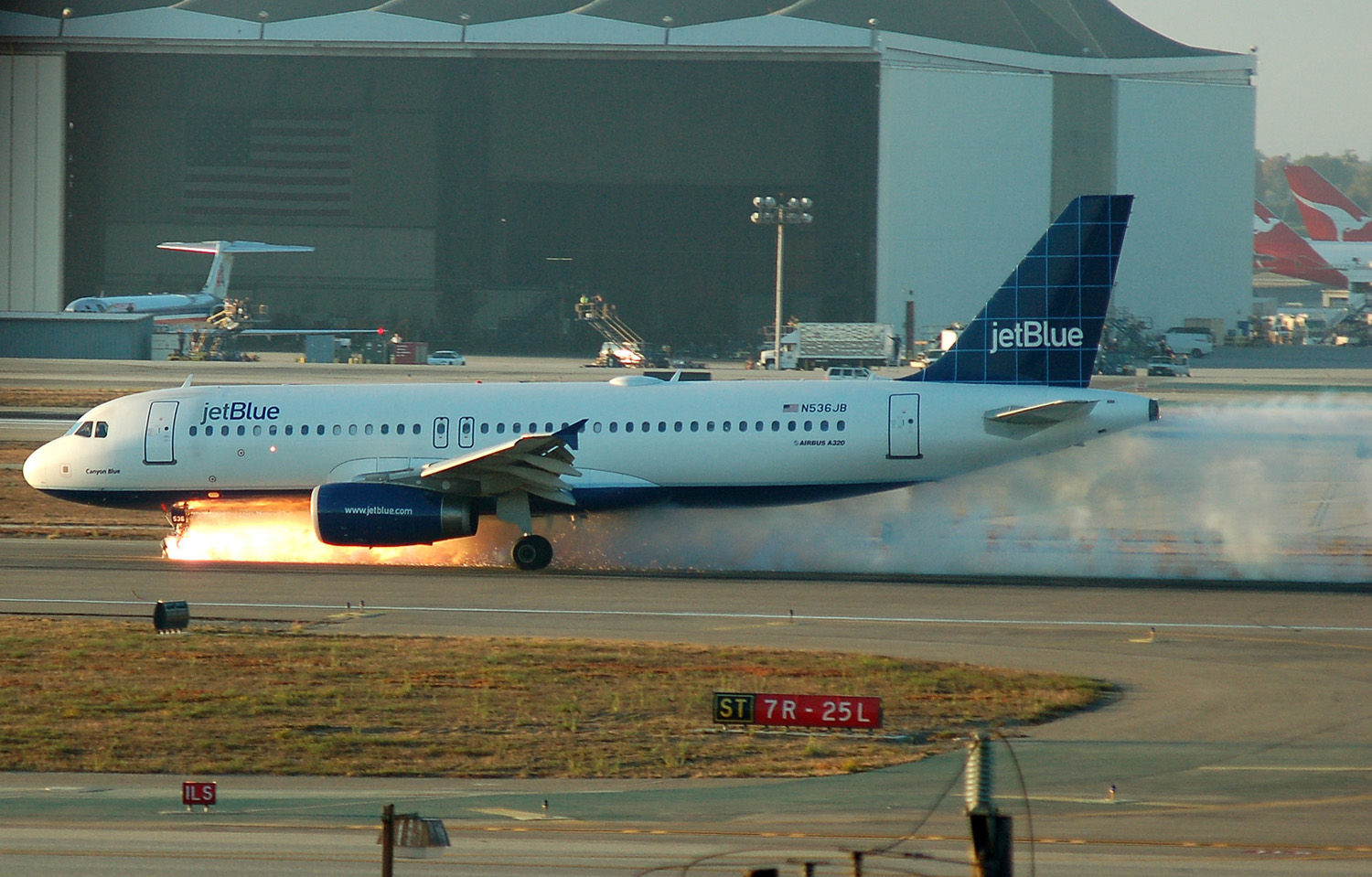
JetBlue Flight 292 makes an emergency landing at Los Angeles International Airport.

An emergency landing is a premature landing made by an aircraft in response to an emergency involving an imminent or ongoing threat to the safety and operation of the aircraft, or involving a sudden need for a passenger or crew on board to terminate the flight (such as a medical emergency). It typically involves a forced diversion to the nearest or most suitable airport or airbase, or an off airport landing or ditching if the flight cannot reach an airfield. Flights under air traffic control will be given priority over all other aircraft operations upon the declaration of the emergency.

== Types ==
There are several different types of emergency landings for powered aircraft: planned landing or unplanned landing.

- Forced landing – the aircraft is forced to make a landing due to technical problems. Landing as soon as possible is a priority, no matter where, since a major system failure has occurred or is imminent. It is caused by the failure of or damage to vital systems such as engines, hydraulics, or landing gear, and so a landing must be attempted where a runway is needed but none is available. The pilot is essentially trying to get the aircraft on the ground in a way which minimizes the possibility of injury or death to the people aboard. This means that the forced landing may even occur when the aircraft is still flyable, in order to prevent a crash or ditching situation.
- Precautionary landing may result from a planned landing at a location about which information is limited, from unanticipated changes during the flight, or from abnormal or even emergency situations. This may be as a result of problems with the aircraft, or a medical or police emergency. The sooner a pilot locates and inspects a potential landing site, the less the chance of additional limitations being imposed by worsening aircraft conditions, deteriorating weather, or other factors.
- Ditching is the same as a forced landing, only on water. After the disabled aircraft makes contact with the surface of the water, the aircraft will most likely sink if it is not designed to float, although it may float for hours, depending on damage.

== Procedures ==
If there is no engine power available during a forced landing, a fixed-wing aircraft glides, while a rotary winged aircraft (helicopter) autorotates to the ground by trading altitude for airspeed to maintain control. Pilots often practice "simulated forced landings", in which an engine failure is simulated and the pilot has to get the aircraft on the ground safely, by selecting a landing area and then gliding the aircraft at its best gliding speed.

If there is a suitable landing spot within the aircraft's gliding or autorotation distance, an unplanned landing will often result in no injuries or significant damage to the aircraft, since powered aircraft generally use little or no power when they are landing. Light aircraft can often land safely on fields, roads, or gravel river banks (or on the water, if they are float-equipped); but medium and heavy aircraft generally require long, prepared runway surfaces because of their heavier weight and higher landing speeds. Glider pilots routinely land away from their base and so most cross-country pilots are in current practice.

== UAV forced landing research ==
Since 2003, research has been conducted on enabling unmanned aerial vehicles to perform a forced landing autonomously.

== Notable examples ==
Large airliners have multiple engines and redundant systems, so forced landings are extremely rare for them, but some notable ones have occurred. A famous example is the Gimli Glider, an Air Canada Boeing 767 that ran out of fuel and glided to a safe landing in Gimli, Manitoba, Canada on July 23, 1983. In June 1982, British Airways Flight 9, a Boeing 747 en route from Kuala Lumpur to Perth flew into a plume of volcanic ash and lost power in all four engines, three of which subsequently recovered, eventually diverting to Jakarta. On April 28, 1988, Aloha Airlines Flight 243 experienced an explosive decompression when approximately 35 square metres (380 ft^{2}) of aluminium skin separated from the fuselage. The flight was successfully diverted to Kahului Airport with only one casualty, flight attendant Clarabelle "C.B." Lansing who was sucked out when the cabin depressurized.

Less than a month later, another 737, TACA Flight 110, lost both engines due to bad weather but was able to make a successful deadstick landing on a grass levee on the grounds of NASA's Michoud Assembly Facility outside New Orleans, with minor injuries to the passengers and minor damage to the aircraft. Investigations drove the engine manufacturer, CFM International, to modify the engine design to prevent future power loss.

One year later, United Airlines Flight 811, a Boeing 747, suffered a cargo door failure in-flight, separating a section of fuselage with 9 passengers and resulted in cabin depressurization. The plane made a successful emergency landing at Honolulu International Airport. More recently, Air Transat Flight 236, an Airbus A330, ran out of fuel over the Atlantic Ocean on August 24, 2001, and made a successful forced landing in the Azores. On November 1, 2011, a Boeing 767 LOT Polish Airlines Flight 016 made a belly landing after a central hydraulic system failure at Warsaw, Poland's Frederic Chopin International Airport, with no injuries.

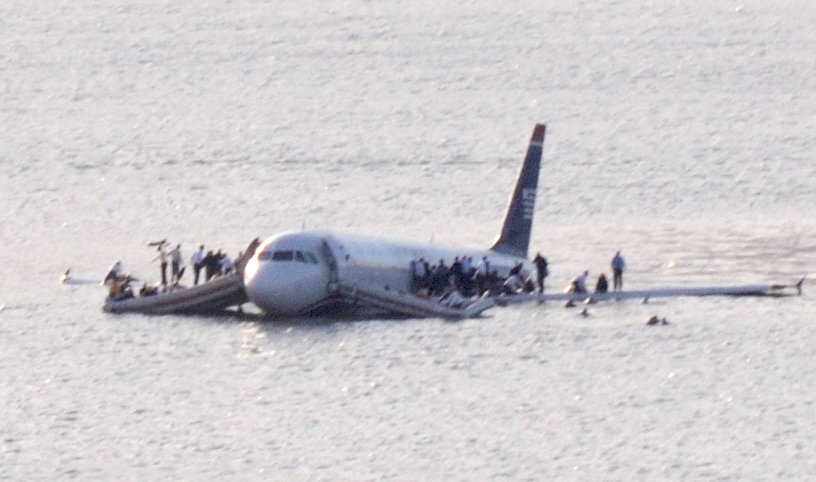
Flight 1549 landing on the waters of the Hudson River

US Airways Flight 1549 in 2009 is probably the most famous emergency landing, making its pilot, Sully Sullenberger, a hero, and the subject of the film, Sully, starring Tom Hanks.

A less successful crash landing involved Southern Airways Flight 242 on April 4, 1977. The DC-9 lost both of its engines due to hail and heavy rain in a thunderstorm and, unable to glide to an airport, made a forced landing on a highway near New Hope, Georgia, United States. The plane made a hard landing and was still carrying a large amount of fuel, so it burst into flames, killing the majority of the passengers and several people on the ground.

Airliners frequently make emergency landings, and almost all of them are uneventful. However, because of their inherent uncertain nature, they can quickly become crash landings or worse. Some notable instances include United Airlines Flight 232, which broke up while landing at Sioux City, Iowa, United States on July 19, 1989; and Air Canada Flight 797, which burned after landing at Cincinnati/Northern Kentucky International Airport on June 2, 1983, after a fire started in the cabin.

Shannon Airport in Ireland has a high number of emergency landings from trans-Atlantic flights, as it is the first major airport after the eastbound ocean crossing.

== See also ==
- Water landing
- Lithobraking
