= Deadstick landing =

Type of forced landing of an aircraft

A deadstick landing, also called a dead-stick landing or volplaning, is a type of forced landing when an aircraft loses all of its propulsive power and is forced to land. The "stick" does not refer to the flight controls, which in most aircraft are either fully or partially functional without engine power; though the etymology is uncertain, it is thought to refer to the traditional wooden propeller, which without power would just be a "dead stick". When a pilot makes an emergency landing of an aircraft that has some or all of its propulsive power still available, the procedure is known as a precautionary landing.

All fixed-wing aircraft have some capability to glide with no engine power; that is, they do not fall straight down like a stone, but rather continue to move horizontally while descending. For example, with a glide ratio of 15:1, a Boeing 747-200 can glide for 150 kilometres (93 mi; 81 nmi) from a cruising altitude of 10,000 metres (33,000 ft). After a loss of power, the pilot’s goal is to maintain a safe airspeed and fly the descending aircraft to the most suitable landing spot within gliding distance, then land with the least damage possible. The area open for potential landing sites depends on the original altitude, local terrain, the engine-out gliding capabilities of the aircraft, original airspeed and winds at various altitudes. Part of learning to fly a fixed-wing aircraft is demonstrating the ability to fly safely without an engine until prepared to make (or actually making) a landing. Gliders, unless they have an auxiliary motor, do all their flying without power, and trained pilots can touch down on virtually any spot they pick from the air.

The success of the deadstick landing largely depends on the availability of suitable landing areas. A competent pilot gliding a relatively light, slow plane to a flat field or runway should result in an otherwise normal landing, since the maneuver is not especially difficult, requiring only strict attention and good judgement concerning speed and height. A heavier, faster aircraft or a plane gliding into mountains or trees could result in substantial damage.

With helicopters, a forced landing involves autorotation, since the helicopter glides by allowing its rotor to spin freely during the descent and thus retain rotor speed and momentum, which allows a descent speed braking lift to be generated closer to the ground by changing the rotor blade pitch just before landing.

== Single engine failure ==
When a single engine aircraft suffers an engine failure, it must do a dead-stick landing. Additional danger can come from pilots subsequently allowing a critical loss of airspeed, which will result in excessively fast loss of altitude and, when poorly handled, loss of control. The instinct to "stretch the glide" by pulling the nose up beyond its optimum point will simply make the aircraft sink faster.

Should the engine power be lost shortly after takeoff, the pilot(s) must evaluate their options: attempting a low-altitude turn back to the airport might be dangerous. This "impossible turn" has killed many pilots because it very likely will result in a crash whereas a landing straight ahead (or within a few degrees of the initial flight path) would be survivable.

== Deadstick landings of passenger aircraft ==
There have been several well-known instances of large jet airliners successfully executing a deadstick landing.

- Aeroflot Flight 366, 21 August 1963: A Tupolev Tu-124 was en route from Tallinn Ülemiste Airport to Moskow-Vnukovo. After takeoff, the nosegear did not retract. Due to fog at Tallinn, the aircraft was diverted to Leningrad Airport. The aircraft circled to reduce fuel prior to landing, but the fuel ran out before a landing could be attempted. The aircraft successfully landed in the Neva River.
- The "Gimli Glider", 23 July 1983: An Air Canada Boeing 767 ran out of fuel en route from Montreal to Edmonton. The crew managed to make a successful dead-stick landing at a former airfield at Gimli (now the Interlake Dragway), where a drag racing event was underway on what had been the runway.
- TACA Flight 110, 24 May 1988: A Boeing 737-300 traveling from Belize City, Belize to New Orleans, Louisiana, United States, lost power in both engines, but made a successful unpowered landing on a grass levee at NASA's Michoud Assembly Facility in the Michoud area of eastern New Orleans.
- Scandinavian Airlines Flight 751, 27 December 1991: Both engines in the McDonnell Douglas MD-81 were destroyed by ice on the wings which was sucked into the engines. It crash-landed tail-first on a frozen field with trees; everyone on board survived.
- Hapag-Lloyd Flight 3378, 12 July 2000: An Airbus A310 en route from Crete to Hanover experienced a landing gear problem and subsequent fuel depletion, resulting in a deadstick landing in Vienna.
- Air Transat Flight 236, 24 August 2001: An Air Transat Airbus A330 ran out of fuel while flying across the North Atlantic from Toronto to Lisbon. The crew glided the aircraft over 121 kilometres (75 mi) and made a deadstick landing at a military air base in the Azores.
- US Airways Flight 1549, 15 January 2009: An Airbus A320 en route from New York City's LaGuardia Airport to Charlotte, North Carolina, lost both engines when it struck a flock of Canada geese on take-off and successfully ditched in the Hudson River adjacent to Manhattan with no loss of human life.
- Ural Airlines Flight 178, 15 August 2019: An Airbus A321 en route from Moscow–Zhukovsky to Simferopol suffered a bird strike shortly after takeoff and landed in a cornfield five kilometres from the airport.
- Ural Airlines Flight 1383, 12 September 2023: An Airbus A320-214 en route from Sochi to Omsk suffered a hydraulic failure affecting the brakes. The aircraft diverted to Novosibirsk, which had a longer runway. The aircraft ran out of fuel and landed in a wheat field. It was initially expected that the aircraft would take off from the field, but it was later decided to dismantle the aircraft.

== See also ==
- Emergency landing
- Hard landing
- Space Shuttle
- Gliding (flight)
- List of airline flights that required gliding
