= TACA Flight 110 =

1988 aviation accident in Louisiana

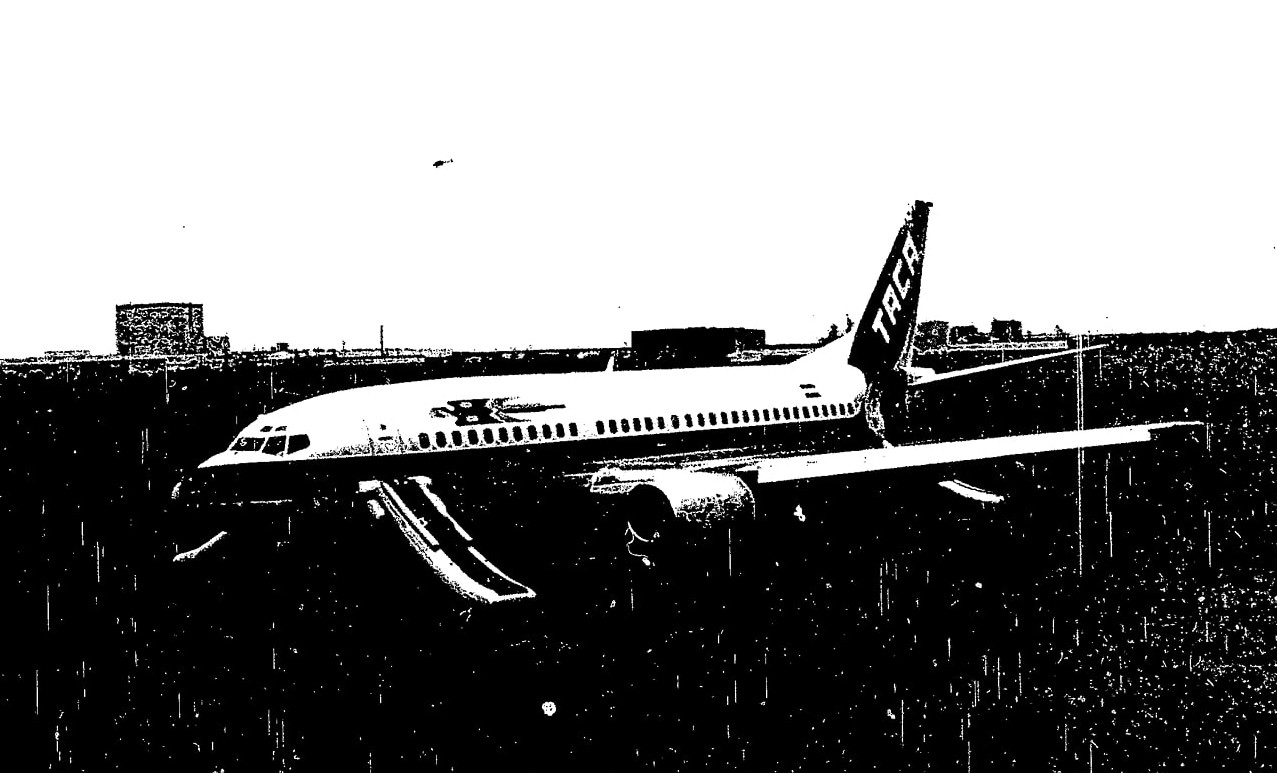
- View of the aircraft as it came to rest on the levee

Accident
- Date: May 24, 1988
- Summary: Emergency landing after dual engine flameout due to hail ingestion in severe thunderstorm
- Site: New Orleans, Louisiana, United States; 30°00′37″N 89°55′42″W

Aircraft
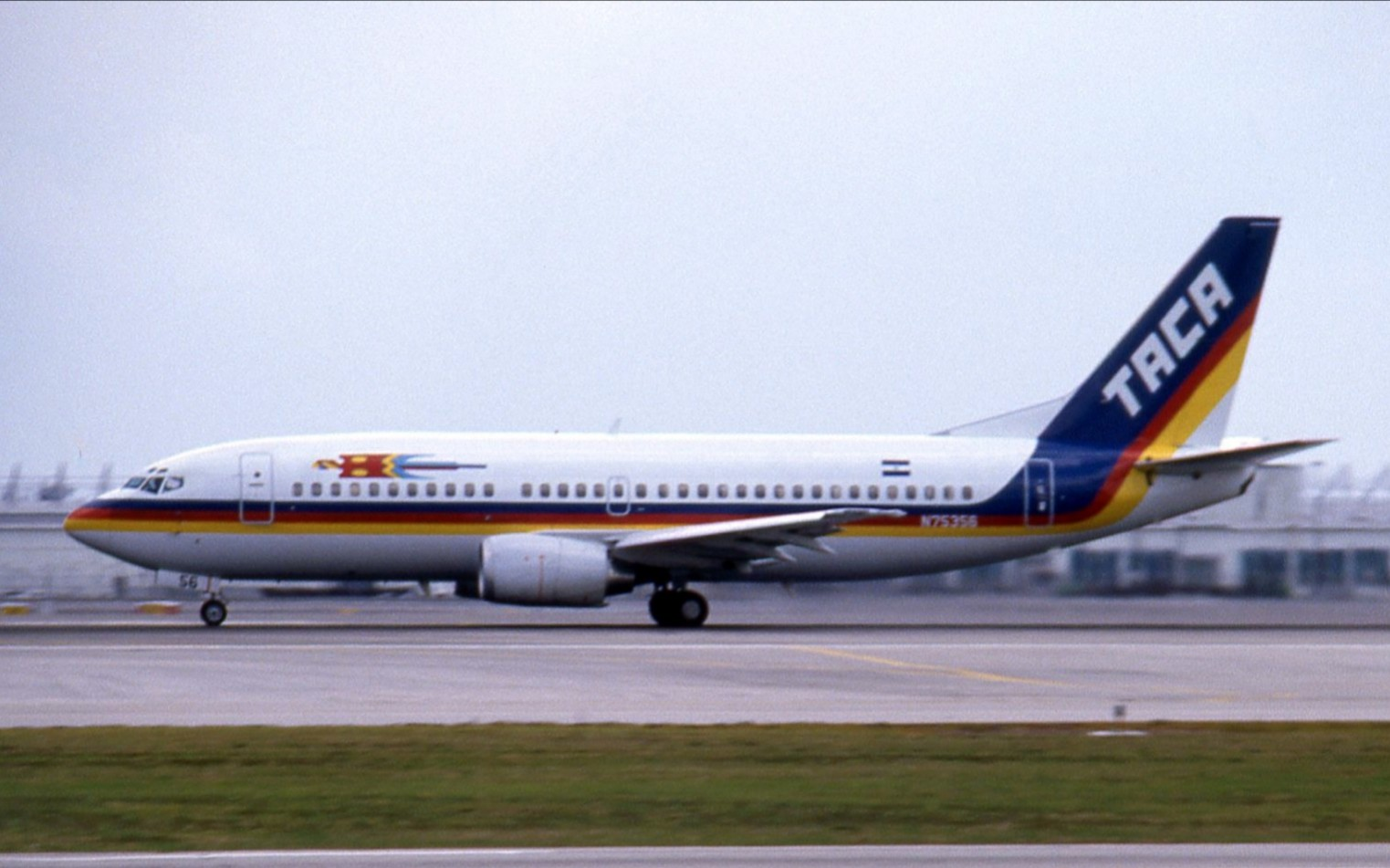
- N75356, the aircraft involved in the accident, seen in 1989
- Aircraft type: Boeing 737-3T0
- Operator: TACA International Airlines
- IATA flight No.: TA110
- ICAO flight No.: TAI110
- Call sign: TACA 110
- Registration: N75356
- Flight origin: Comalapa International Airport, San Salvador, El Salvador
- Stopover: Philip S. W. Goldson International Airport, Belize City, Belize
- Destination: New Orleans International Airport, Louisiana, United States
- Occupants: 45
- Passengers: 38
- Crew: 7
- Fatalities: 0
- Survivors: 45

TACA Flight 110 was a scheduled international flight operated by TACA International Airlines, traveling from San Salvador to New Orleans, with a stopover in Belize City. On May 24, 1988, the flight encountered severe thunderstorm activity on its final approach to New Orleans International Airport. As a result, the brand new Boeing 737-300 suffered flameout in both engines, but the pilots made a successful emergency landing on a grass levee adjacent to NASA's Michoud Assembly Facility, with no one aboard sustaining more than a few minor injuries, and with only minor hail damage to the intact aircraft. Following an on-site engine replacement, the jetliner took off from Saturn Boulevard, a road that had previously been an aircraft runway at Michoud. The aircraft was subsequently repaired and returned to service until it was retired in 2016.

== Flight history ==
The aircraft involved in the incident was a Boeing 737-3T0 with the tail number N75356 and serial number 23838.

The captain of the flight was Carlos Dárdano. At 29 years of age, Dárdano had amassed 13,410 flight hours, with almost 11,000 of these as pilot in command. Earlier in his career, he had lost an eye to crossfire on a short flight to El Salvador, where civil war was raging at the time. The first officer, Dionisio Lopez (48), was also very experienced, with more than 12,000 flight hours logged. Additionally an instructor pilot, Captain Arturo Soley, was in the cockpit on the flight, monitoring the performance of the new 737.

The flight proceeded normally for most of its duration. Originating from San Salvador's Comalapa International Airport, it took off from Belize City's Philip S. W. Goldson International Airport on May 24, 1988, and flew over the Gulf of Mexico toward the Louisiana coast.

== Incident ==
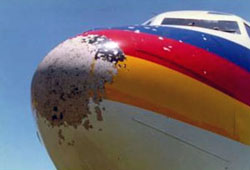
Hail damage to the nose of the aircraft

Investigation by the National Transportation Safety Board (NTSB) revealed that as the Boeing 737-3T0 aircraft was in descent mode from FL 350 (about 35,000 feet or 11,000 metres) on final approach to its destination in preparation for their impending arrival at New Orleans International Airport, the pilots noticed substantial thunderstorm activity visible ahead and on their onboard weather radar and noticed areas of light to moderate precipitation in their path, depicted as green and yellow areas, as well as "some isolated red cells" indicative of heavy precipitation to both sides of their intended flight path. They attempted to fly in between two intense red weather cells visible on their radar.

The flight entered overcast clouds at FL 300 (about 30,000 feet or 9,100 metres), with the pilots selecting "continuous ignition" and turning on engine anti-ice as a precaution to protect their turbofan engines from the effects of precipitation and icing, either of which is capable of causing a flameout, where the engines lose all power. Despite flying a route between the two areas of heavy precipitation shown on radar, they entered an intense thunderstorm and encountered heavy torrential rain, hail, and turbulence.

A few minutes later, as the aircraft was descending through 16,500 feet (5,000 m), both CFM International CFM56 turbofan engines experienced a flameout, which resulted in the loss of all generated electrical power, leaving the jet gliding powerlessly with neither engine producing thrust or electrical power. Both engines' thrust levers were set at their flight-idle power setting in preparation for landing just before the flameout occurred. The auxiliary power unit (APU) was started as the plane descended through 10,500 feet (3,200 m), restoring electrical power and hydraulics.

While attempts to "windmill re-start" the engines using the airflow generated by the plane's descent were unsuccessful, the pilots were eventually able to reignite them by following the standard restart procedure, using the main engine starters, which were powered by the APU. However, shortly after being restarted, neither engine produced more than idle power and did not spool up to a point where it was producing meaningful thrust, much less high thrust. Attempts to advance the throttles only resulted in overheating of the engines, so the pilots shut down both engines to avoid a catastrophic engine fire. First Officer Lopez transmitted a Mayday call over the radio, but despite the New Orleans air traffic controllers' assistance by offering vectors to a closer airport at Lakefront, it was too far.

At this point the pilots scouted the area and contemplated their options for a crash-landing on the swampy wetland, as no runway was reachable with the remaining altitude and airspeed. As the aircraft descended through the lower layer of storm clouds, the pilots initially decided to ditch in the Gulf Intracoastal Waterway with the flaps and gear retracted. Dárdano lined up with the canal in an industrial area east of the airport and stretched the glide, to try to have it glide the longest possible distance without stalling while First Officer Lopez went through the ditching checklist, and configured the aircraft for a water landing.

Lopez spotted a grass levee to the right of the canal, and suggested that the emergency landing be attempted there. Dárdano agreed, and using sideslip to reduce speed while dropping the altitude necessary to reach the narrow grass levee, successfully carried out an emergency landing of the crippled plane. The levee stands on the grounds of the NASA Michoud Assembly Facility (MAF) in eastern New Orleans, near the Intracoastal Waterway's confluence with the Mississippi River–Gulf Outlet Canal.

== Investigation and aftermath ==
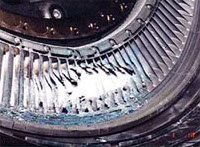
Engine turbine damage from TACA Flight 110

NTSB investigators determined that the aircraft had inadvertently flown into a level 4 thunderstorm and that water ingestion had caused both engines to flame out, during descent with lower engine RPM, despite them being certified to meeting Federal Aviation Administration (FAA) standards for water ingestion. The aircraft suffered mild hail damage, and its right-side (number 2) engine was damaged from overheating.

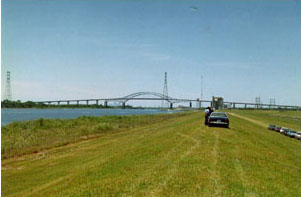
The landing site of TACA 110

To avoid similar problems in the future, the engine manufacturer, CFM International, modified the CFM56 engine by adding a sensor to force the combustor to continuously ignite under heavy rain or hail conditions. Other modifications were made to the engine nose cone and the spacing of the fan blades to better deflect hail away from the engine core. Also, additional bleed doors were added to drain more water from the engine.

=== Return to service ===
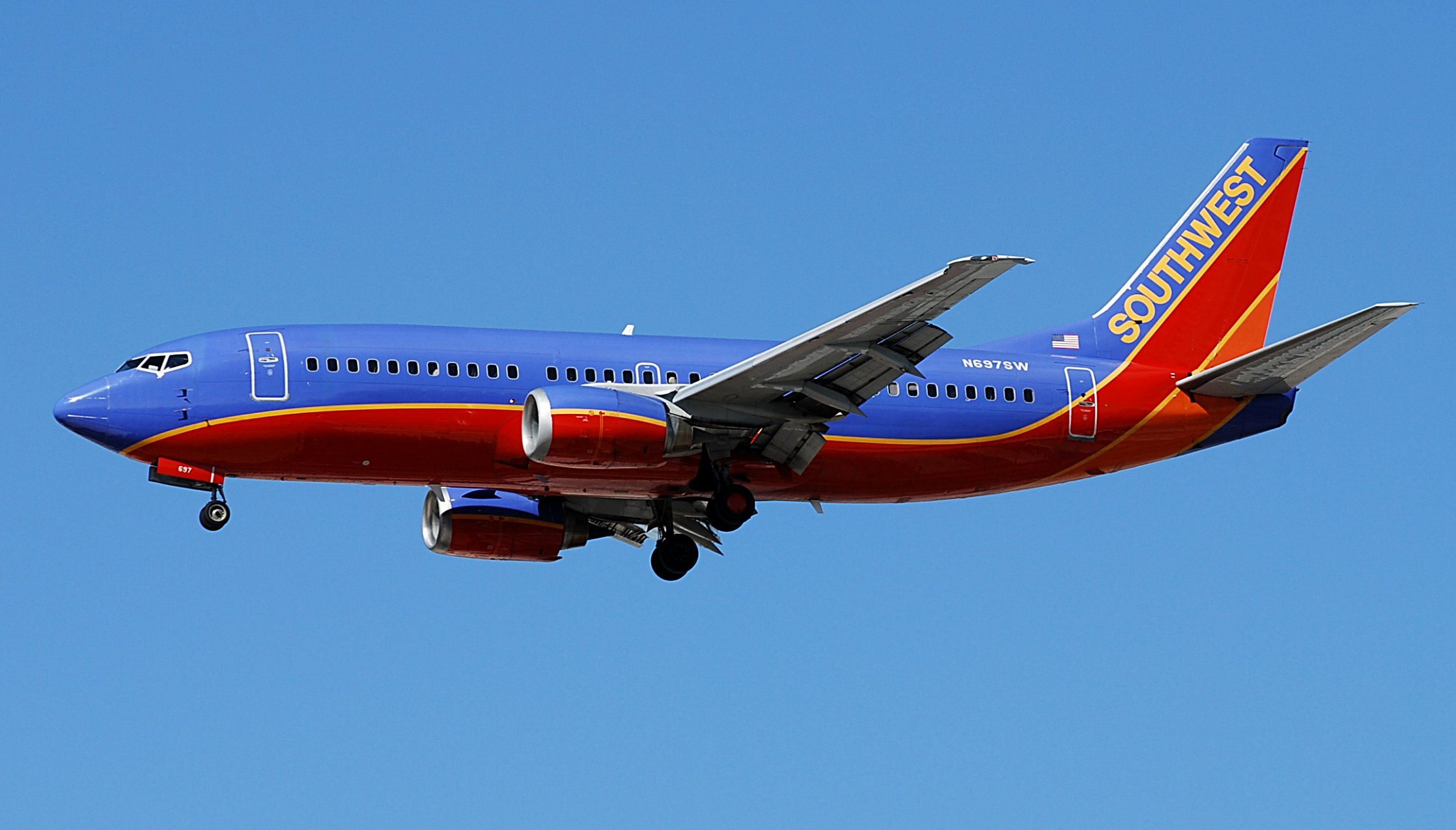
The aircraft involved, operating with Southwest Airlines in 2010

Initially, it was planned to remove the wings and transport the airplane to a repair facility by barge, but Boeing engineers and test pilots decided to perform an engine change on site. The aircraft was towed from the levee to the nearby NASA facility, fueled to the minimum amount needed and departed from Saturn Boulevard, a roadway built atop the original World War II-era runway. Following takeoff, the 737 flew to Moisant Field, where further maintenance work was performed.

It continued service for Southwest as N697SW until December 2, 2016, when it was retired and placed into storage at Pinal Airpark.

== Media ==
The flight was featured in an episode of the TV show Mayday with the title "Nowhere to Land"; the episode is from season 11, episode 11.

== See also ==
- CFM56 engine issues in rain and hail
- List of airline flights that required gliding
- Garuda Indonesia Flight 421 – Similar incident with same aircraft type, dual engine flameout when passing through thunderstorm
