= Lithobraking =

Landing technique

Lithobraking is a term used by spacecraft engineers to refer to a spacecraft reducing its velocity by impacting the surface of a planet or moon. Originally coined as whimsical euphemism for a "crash landing", it is now also used when the collision is deliberate. The word was coined by analogy with "aerobraking", slowing a spacecraft by intersecting the atmosphere, with "lithos" (Ancient Greek: λίθος [líthos], "rock") substituted to indicate the spacecraft is intersecting the planet's solid lithosphere rather than merely its gaseous atmosphere.

According to Jonathan McDowell, "Lithobraking reduces the apoapsis height to zero instantly, but with the unfortunate side effect that the spacecraft does not survive. Originally a whimsical euphemism, but increasingly a standard term."

The term lithobraking has been popularised by the video game Kerbal Space Program as a euphemism for spacecraft crashes.

== End-of-mission lithobraking ==
Lithobraking was originally used to refer to the result of a spacecraft crashing into the rocky surface of a body with no measures to ensure its survival, either by accident or with intent. For instance, the term was used to describe the impact of MESSENGER into Mercury after the spacecraft ran out of fuel. More recently, the term has also been used to describe the successful completion of the Double Asteroid Redirection Test (DART), when a probe crashed into Dimorphos to test lithobraking as a method of planetary defense.

== Intact lithobraking ==
Lithobraking while remaining operational requires a spacecraft capable of impacting the planet or moon at high velocity, or protecting the probe with sufficient cushioning to withstand an impact with the surface undamaged.

In the absence of a thick atmosphere, lithobraking is difficult due to the extremely high orbital velocities of most bodies. However, the orbital velocity of small moons (for example, Phobos), asteroids, and comets can be sufficiently small for this strategy to be feasible.

Instead of attempting to slowly dissipate the incoming velocity, it can be used to enable the probe to penetrate the surface. This can be tried on bodies with low gravitation, such as comets and asteroids, or on planets with atmospheres (by using only small parachutes, or no parachutes at all). Several such missions have been launched, including penetrators on the two Phobos probe landers targeted for Mars' moon Phobos and ones for Mars itself on Mars 96 and Deep Space 2, but so far none have succeeded.

== See also ==
- Aerocapture
- Aerogravity assist
- Asteroid capture
- Atmospheric reentry
- Skip reentry
