= Aerogravity assist =

Theoretical spacecraft maneuver

An aerogravity assist, or AGA, is a theoretical spacecraft maneuver designed to change velocity when arriving at a body with an atmosphere. A pure gravity assist uses only the gravity of a body to change the direction of the spacecraft trajectory. The change in direction is limited by the mass of the body, and how closely it can be approached. An aerogravity assist uses a closer approach to the planet, dipping into the atmosphere, so the spacecraft can also use aerodynamic lift with upside-down wings to augment gravity and further curve the trajectory. This enables the spacecraft to deflect through a larger angle, resulting in a higher delta-v (change in velocity). This in turn allows a shorter travel time, a larger payload fraction of the spacecraft, or a smaller spacecraft for a given payload.

The related techniques of aerocapture, aerobraking, and atmospheric entry also attempt to use the body's atmosphere to help reduce propulsion requirements. In an aerogravity assist, however, the goal is not to use the atmosphere to slow the spacecraft down, but instead use it to achieve a larger change in direction.

While the use of an aerogravity assist has been proposed for a variety of missions, including the capture of a spacecraft into orbit about Saturn, the technique has not yet been used in practice.

== See also ==
- Planetary flyby
- Flyby (spaceflight)
