= Aerocapture =

Orbital transfer maneuver

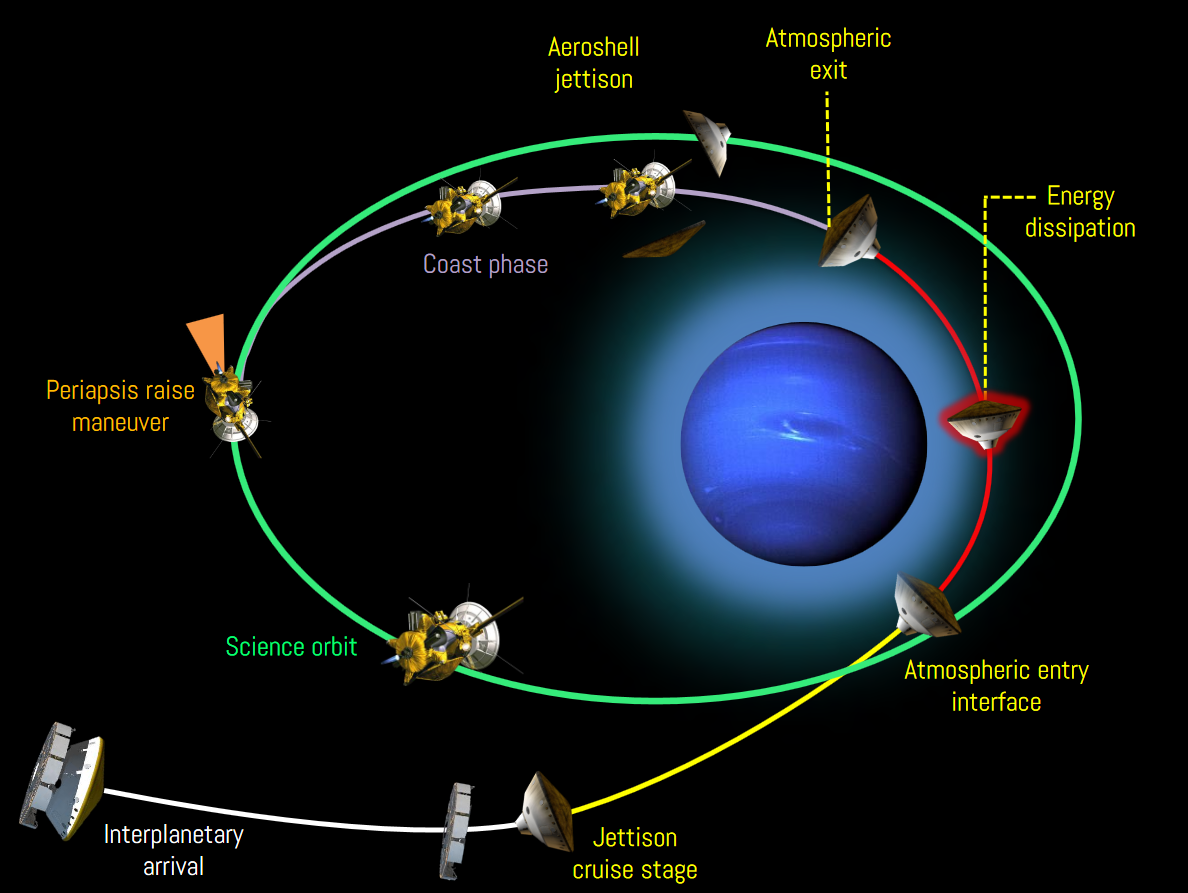
Schematic showing the various phases of the aerocapture maneuver. Atmospheric height is greatly exaggerated for clarity.

Aerocapture is an orbital transfer maneuver in which a spacecraft uses aerodynamic drag force from a single pass through a planetary atmosphere to decelerate and achieve orbit insertion.

Aerocapture uses a planet's or moon's atmosphere to accomplish a quick, near-propellantless orbit insertion maneuver to place a spacecraft in its science orbit. The aerocapture maneuver starts as the spacecraft enters the atmosphere of the target body from an interplanetary approach trajectory. The aerodynamic drag generated as the vehicle descends into the atmosphere slows the spacecraft. After the spacecraft slows enough to be captured by the planet, it exits the atmosphere and executes a small propulsive burn at the first apoapsis to raise the periapsis outside the atmosphere. Additional small burns may be required to correct apoapsis and inclination targeting errors before the initial science orbit is established.

Compared to conventional propulsive orbit insertion, this nearly fuel-free method of deceleration could significantly reduce the mass of an interplanetary spacecraft, as a substantial fraction of the spacecraft mass is often propellant used for the orbit insertion burn. The saving in propellant mass allows for more science instrumentation to be added to the mission, or allows for a smaller and less-expensive spacecraft, and, potentially, a smaller, less-expensive launch vehicle.

Because of the aerodynamic heating encountered during the atmospheric pass, the spacecraft must be packaged inside an aeroshell (or a deployable entry system) with a thermal protection system. The vehicle also requires autonomous closed-loop guidance during the maneuver to enable the vehicle to target the desired capture orbit and command the vehicle to exit the atmosphere when sufficient energy has been dissipated. Ensuring that the vehicle has enough control authority to prevent the spacecraft penetrating too deep into the atmosphere or exiting prematurely without dissipating enough energy requires either the use of a lifting aeroshell, or a drag-modulation system, which can change the vehicle's drag-producing area during flight.

Aerocapture has been shown to be feasible at Venus, Earth, Mars, and Titan using existing entry vehicles and thermal protection system materials. Until recently, mid-L/D (lift-to-drag) vehicles were considered essential for aerocapture at Uranus and Neptune, due to the large uncertainties in entry state and atmospheric density profiles. However, advances in interplanetary navigation and atmospheric guidance techniques have shown that heritage low-L/D aeroshells such as Apollo offer sufficient control authority for aerocapture at Neptune. Aerocapture at Jupiter and Saturn is considered a long-term goal, as their huge gravity wells result in very high entry speeds and harsh aerothermal environments, making aerocapture a less attractive, and, perhaps, infeasible option at these destinations. However, it is possible to use an aerogravity assist at Titan to insert a spacecraft around Saturn.

== History ==
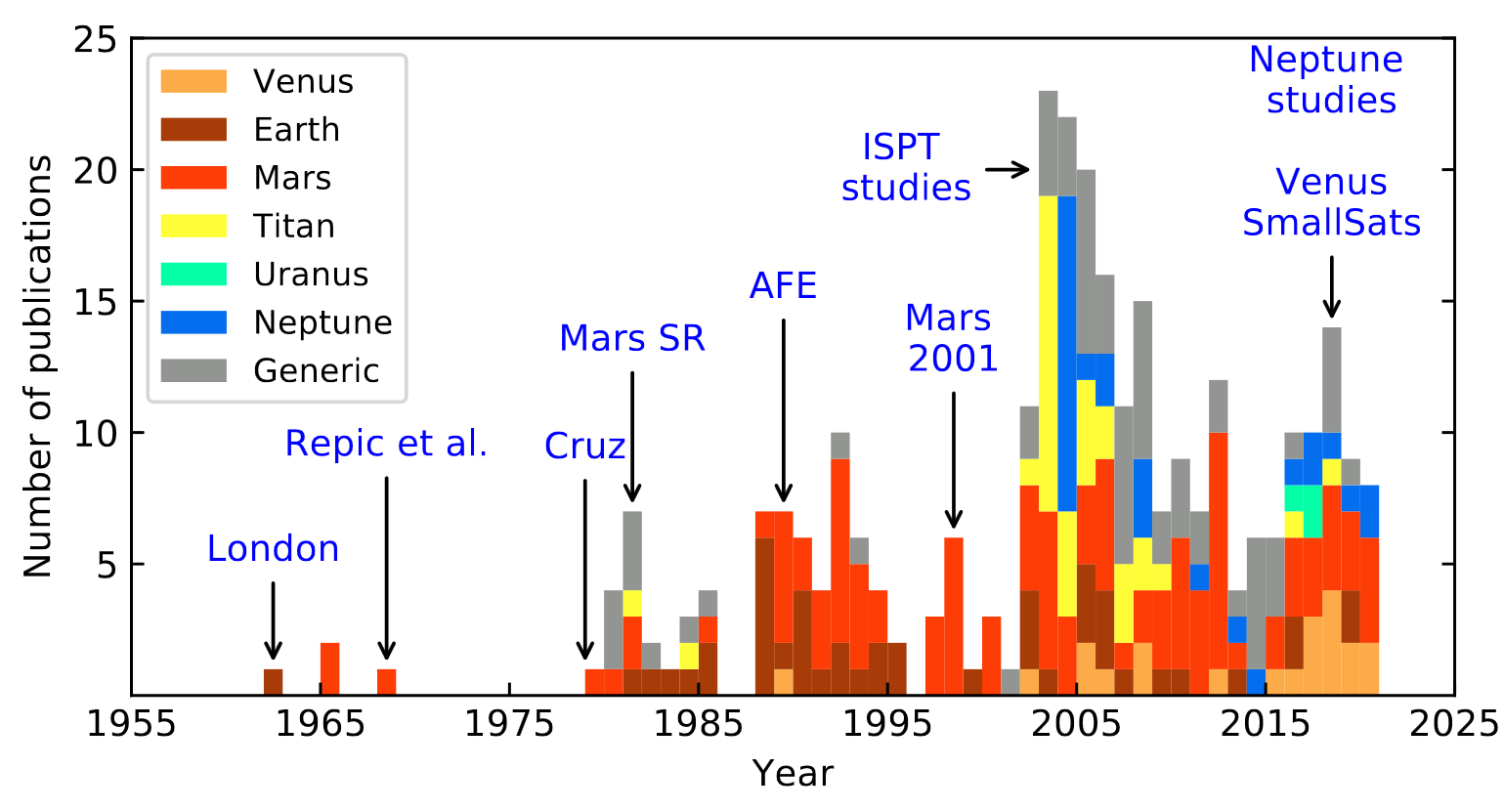
Histogram showing the number of publications addressing aerocapture since the 1960s, classified by target planet.

Aerocapture has been studied for planetary missions since the early 1960s. London's pioneering article on using aerodynamic maneuvering to change the plane of a satellite in Earth orbit, instead of using a propulsive maneuver is considered a precursor for the concept of aerocapture. The aerocapture concept was then referred to as aerodynamic braking or "aerobraking", and was investigated as a potential orbit insertion method for Mars and Venus missions by Repic et al. In modern terminology, aerobraking refers to a different "aeroassist" maneuver and is not to be confused with aerocapture. Cruz's 1979 article was the first to use the word aerocapture, and was followed by a series of studies focusing on its applications to Mars Sample Return (SR).

In the late 1980s, the Aeroassist Flight Experiment (AFE) was conceived to use a Shuttle-launched payload to demonstrate aerocapture at Earth. The project resulted in a number of significant developments, including guidance flight software, but was eventually cancelled due to cost overruns and was never flown. In the late 1990s, aerocapture was considered for the Mars Odyssey mission (then referred to as Mars 2001 Surveyor), but was later dropped in favor of aerobraking due to cost reasons and heritage with other Mars missions. In the early 2000s, aerocapture was identified as the focus area by the NASA In-Space Propulsion Technology (ISPT) program. A multi-center Aerocapture Systems Analysis Team (ASAT) was put together under this project to define reference aerocapture missions at various Solar System destinations and identify any technology gaps to be closed before implementation on a flight project. The ASAT team led by Mary Kae Lockwood at the NASA Langley Research Center studied in substantial detail aerocapture mission concepts to Venus, Mars, Titan, and Neptune. Since 2016, there is renewed interest in aerocapture particularly with respect to small satellite orbit insertion at Venus and Mars, and Flagship-class missions to Uranus and Neptune in the upcoming decade.

== Benefits of aerocapture ==
NASA technologists are developing ways to place robotic space vehicles into long-duration scientific orbits around distant Solar System destinations without the need for the heavy fuel loads that have historically limited vehicle performance, mission duration, and mass available for science payloads.

A study showed that using aerocapture over the next best method (propellant burn and aerobraking) would allow for a significant increase in scientific payload for missions ranging from Venus (79% increase) to Titan (280% increase) and Neptune (832% increase). Additionally, the study showed that using aerocapture technology could enable scientifically useful missions to Jupiter and Saturn.

Aerocapture technology has also been evaluated for use in crewed Mars missions and found to offer significant mass benefits. For this application, however, the trajectory must be constrained to avoid excessive deceleration loads on the crew. Although there are similar constraints on trajectories for robotic missions, the human limits are typically more stringent, especially in light of the effects of prolonged microgravity on acceleration tolerances.

== Aerocapture spacecraft designs ==
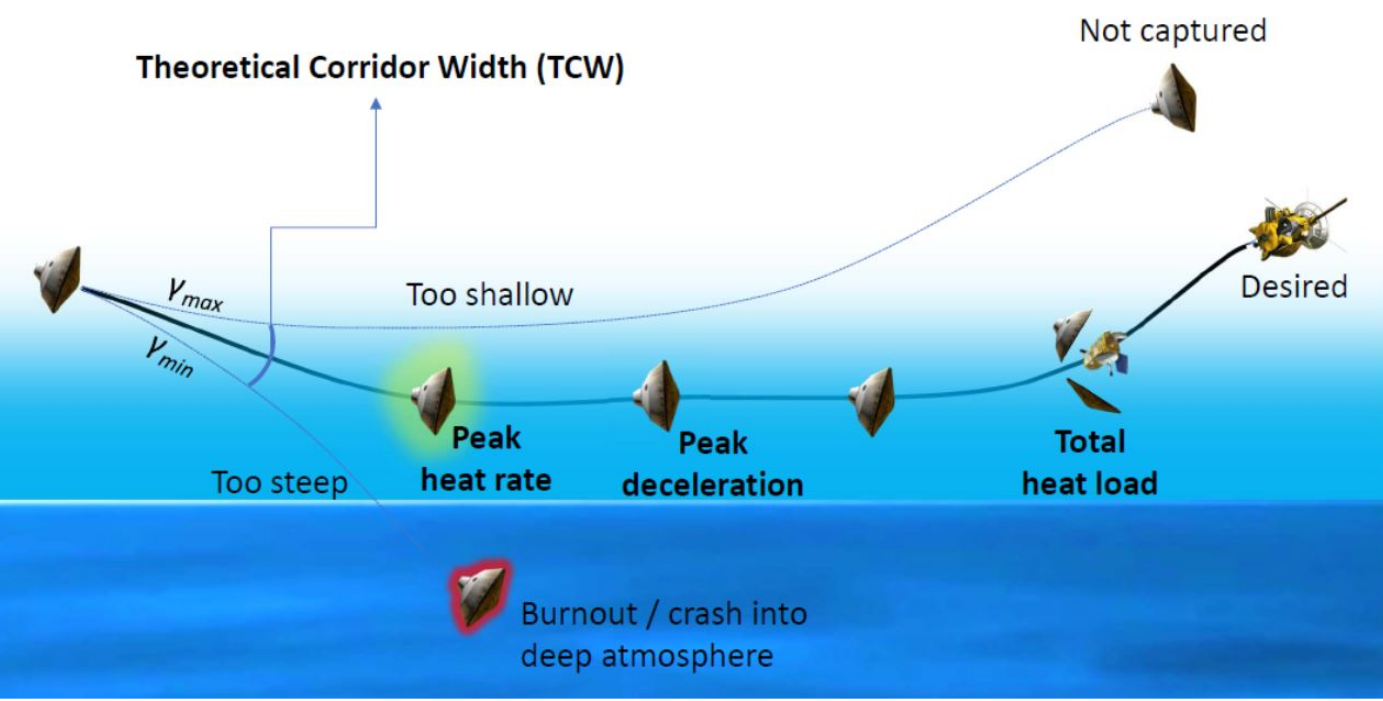
Schematic illustration of the aerocapture vehicle entry corridor

To perform aerocapture, the vehicle must enter the atmosphere within the aerocapture theoretical entry corridor. Entering too steep will result in the vehicle failing to exit the atmosphere. Entering too shallow will result in the vehicle exiting the atmosphere without depleting enough energy. Entering within the corridor allows the vehicle guidance scheme to achieve the desired exit conditions for a capture orbit around the planet.

The aerocapture maneuver can be accomplished with three basic types of systems. The spacecraft can be enclosed by a structure covered with thermal protection material, also known as the rigid aeroshell design. Similarly another option is for the vehicle to deploy an aerocapture device, such as an inflatable heat shield, known as the inflatable aeroshell design or a mechanically deployed drag skirt. The third major design option is of an inflatable, trailing ballute—a combination balloon and parachute made of thin, durable material towed behind the vehicle after deployment in the vacuum of space.

=== Blunt body, rigid aeroshell design ===
The blunt body, rigid aeroshell system encases a spacecraft in a protective shell. This shell acts as an aerodynamic surface, providing lift and drag, and provides protection from the intense heating experienced during high-speed atmospheric flight. Once the spacecraft is captured into orbit, the aeroshell is jettisoned.

NASA has used blunt aeroshell systems in the past for atmospheric entry missions. The most recent example is the Mars Exploration Rovers, Spirit and Opportunity, which launched in June and July 2003, and landed on the Martian surface in January 2004. Another example is the Apollo Command Module. The module was used for six uncrewed space flights from February 1966 to April 1968 and eleven crewed missions from Apollo 7 in October 1968 through the final crewed Apollo 17 lunar mission in December 1972. Because of its extensive heritage, the aeroshell system design is well understood. Adaptation of the aeroshell from atmospheric entry to aerocapture requires mission-specific customization of the thermal protection material to accommodate the different heating environments of aerocapture. Also, higher-temperature adhesives and lightweight, high temperature structures are desired to minimize the mass of the aerocapture system.

=== Deployable or Inflatable aeroshell design ===
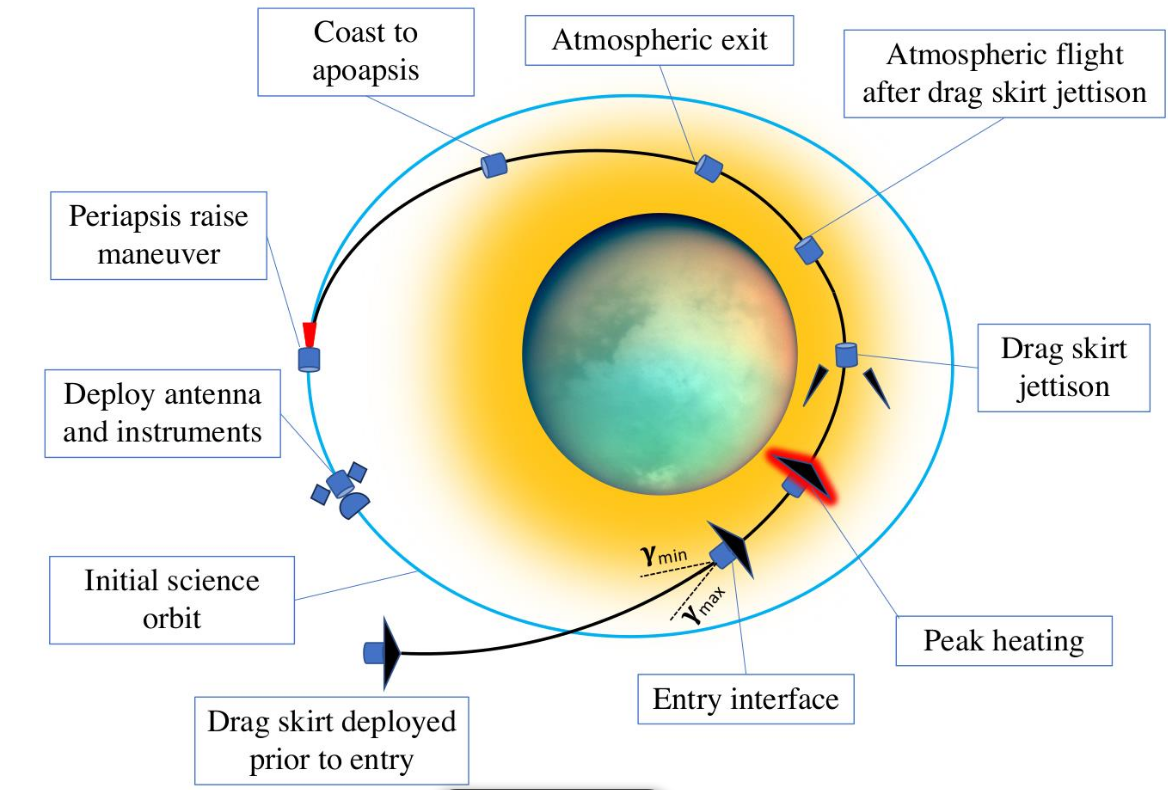
Schematic of drag modulation aerocapture using a deployable or inflatable aeroshell

The deployable or inflatable aeroshell design looks much like the aeroshell or blunt body design. But unlike the lifting aeroshell, the deployable or inflatable systems produce no lift. The only control variable is the drag area. The inflatable aeroshell is often referred to as a hybrid system, with a rigid nosepiece and an inflated, attached decelerator to increase the drag area. Just prior to entering the atmosphere, the inflatable aeroshell extends from a rigid nose-cap and provides a larger surface area to slow the spacecraft down. Made of thin-film material and reinforced with a ceramic cloth, the inflatable aeroshell design could offer many of the same advantages and functionality as trailing ballute designs. While not as large as the trailing ballute, the inflatable aeroshell is roughly three times larger than the rigid aeroshell system and performs the aerocapture maneuver higher in the atmosphere, reducing heating loads. Because the system is inflatable, the spacecraft is not enclosed during launch and cruise, which allows more flexibility during spacecraft design and operations.

=== Trailing ballute design ===
One of the primary inflatable deceleration technologies is a trailing ballute configuration. The design features a toroidal, or donut-shaped, decelerator, made of a lightweight, thin-film material. The ballute is much larger than the spacecraft and is towed behind the craft, much like a parachute, to slow the vehicle down. The "trailing" design also allows for easy detachment after the aerocapture maneuver is complete. The trailing ballute design has performance advantages over the rigid aeroshell design, such as not constraining the spacecraft size and shape, and subjecting the vehicle to much lower aerodynamic and thermal loads. Because the trailing ballute is much larger than the spacecraft, aerocapture occurs high in the atmosphere, where much less heat is generated. The ballute incurs most of the aerodynamic forces and heat, allowing the use of minimal thermal protection around the spacecraft. One of the primary advantages of the ballute configuration is mass. Where the rigid aeroshell may account for 30–40% of the mass of a spacecraft, the ballute mass fraction could be as little as 8–12%, saving mass for more science payload.

== In practice ==
Aerocapture has not yet been tried on a planetary mission, but the re-entry skip by Zond 6 and Zond 7 upon lunar return were aerocapture maneuvers, since they turned a hyperbolic orbit into an elliptical orbit. On these missions, since there was no attempt to raise the perigee after the aerocapture, the resulting orbit still intersected the atmosphere, and re-entry occurred at the next perigee.

Aerocapture was originally planned for the Mars Odyssey orbiter but later changed to aerobraking for reasons of cost and commonality with other missions.

Aerocapture has been proposed and analyzed for arrival at Saturn's moon, Titan.

== In fiction ==
Aerocapture within fiction can be read in Arthur C. Clarke's novel 2010: Odyssey Two, in which two spacecraft (one Russian, one Chinese) both use aerocapture in Jupiter's atmosphere to shed their excess velocity and position themselves for exploring Jupiter's satellites. This can be seen as a special effect in the movie version in which only a Russian spacecraft undergoes aerocapture (in the film incorrectly called aerobraking).

Players of the video game Kerbal Space Program often employ aerocapture, particularly when exploring the satellites of Jool (a gas giant that serves as the game's Jupiter analogue).

In the television serial Stargate Universe, the ship Destiny's autopilot employs aerocapture within the atmosphere of a gas giant at the edge of a star system. This puts the ship on a direct heading into the star at the center of the system.

In the sci-fi novel Delta-v, asteroid miners use a purpose-built aerocapture ship in a desperate attempt to return to Earth from the asteroid Ryugu.

== Related methods ==
Aerocapture is part of a family of "aeroassist" technologies being developed by NASA for science missions to any planetary body with an appreciable atmosphere. These destinations could include Mars, Venus and Saturn's moon Titan, along with the outer planets.

Aerobraking is another aeroassist maneuver that shares some similarities but also some important differences with aerocapture. While aerocapture is used for inserting a spacecraft into orbit from a hyperbolic trajectory, aerobraking is used for reducing the apoapsis of a spacecraft that is already in orbit.

Comparison of aerocapture and aerobraking
	Aerocapture	Aerobraking
Starting trajectory	Interplanetary	High orbit
Atmospheric passes over duration	1 over hours to days	100–400 over weeks to months
Depth of atmospheric entry	Relatively dense mid-atmosphere	Sparse outer atmosphere
Hardware requirements	Heavy heat shield	No heat shield

== Software ==
- Aerocapture Mission Analysis Tool (AMAT) provides rapid mission analysis capability for aerocapture and Entry, Descent, and Landing (EDL) mission concepts to atmosphere-bearing destinations in the Solar System.

== See also ==
- Aerobraking
- Aerogravity assist
- Asteroid capture
- Atmospheric reentry
- Skip reentry
