= Forced landing =

Type of emergency landing

A forced landing is a landing by an aircraft made under factors outside the pilot's control, such as the failure of engines, systems, components, or weather which makes continued flight impossible. However, the term also means a landing that has been forced by interception.

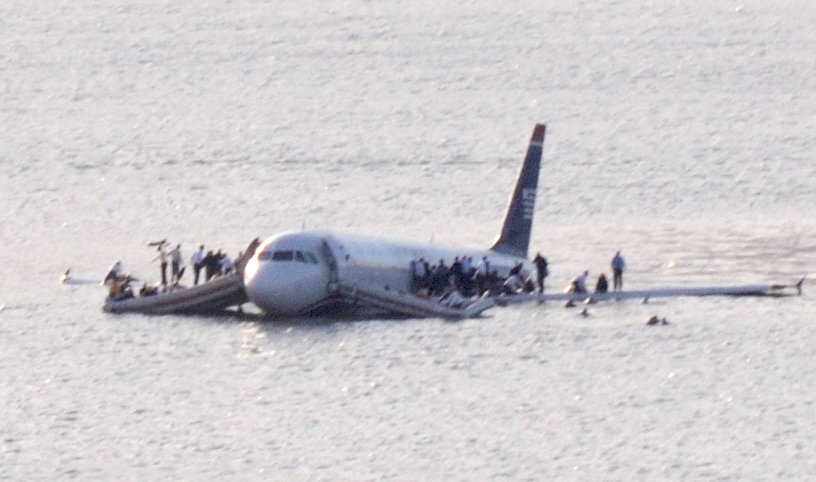
US Airways Flight 1549 after successfully ditching on the Hudson River

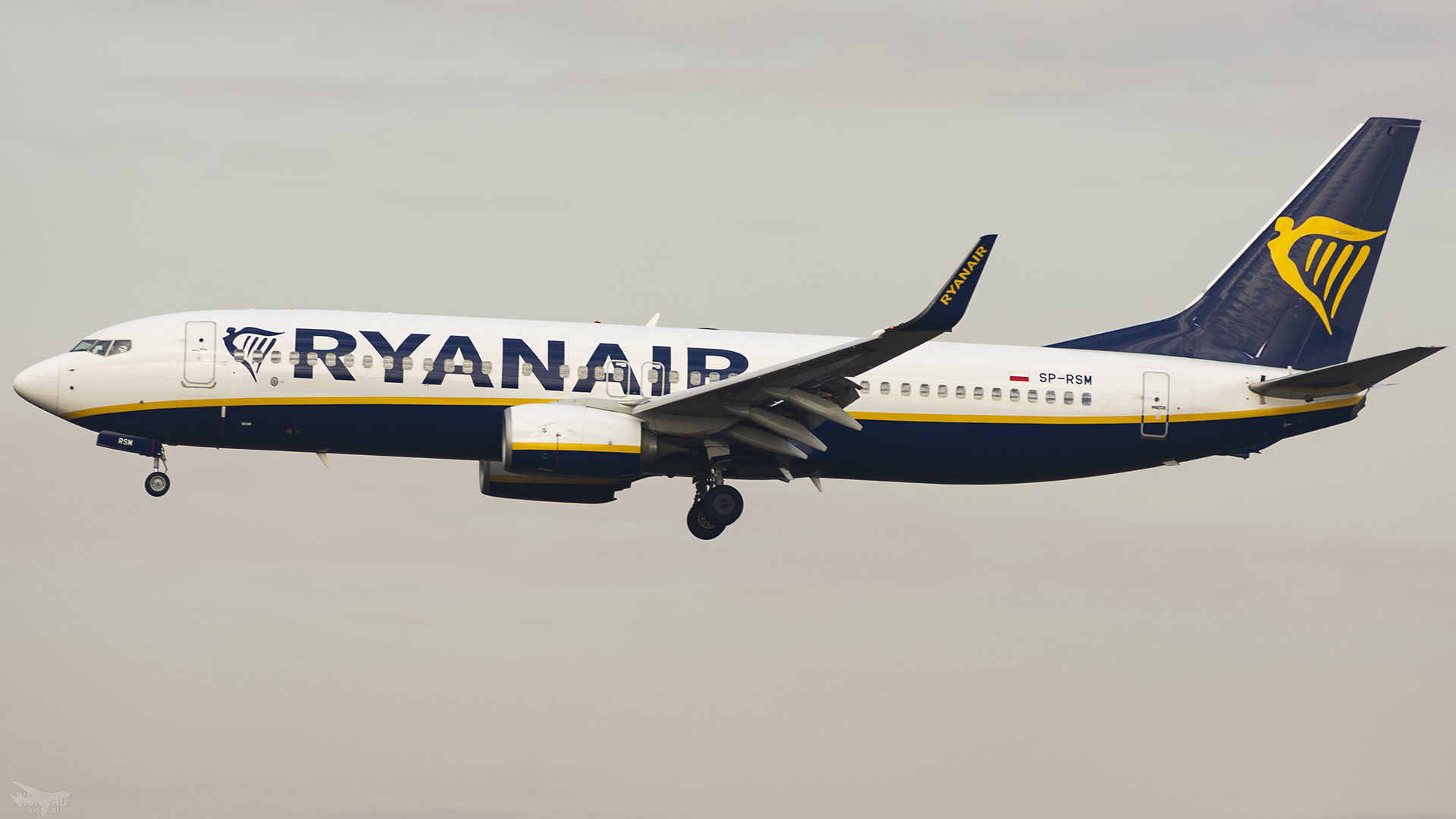
Ryanair Flight 4978 forced to land at Minsk National Airport due to an alleged bombing attempt

A plane may be compelled to land through the use, or threat of use, of force, if it strays off course into hostile foreign territory. The Chicago Convention on International Civil Aviation contains guidance in Annex 2 on "Signals for Use in the Event of Interception": customarily for the military plane approaches the airliner from below and to the left, where the plane is easily visible from the left seat where the captain sits. The intercepting plane waggles its wings to signal the demand to be followed.

Territorial airspace is under the sovereignty of the relevant state, and their domestic law would regulate the treatment of intruding aircraft. Consequences could include:

… aircraft that fail to identify themselves, enter the airspace without a necessary permission, deny to follow a prescribed route, head towards a prohibited zone, or violate [...] a prohibition of flight may, by strict observance of the relevant standards and procedures, as a last resort, be intercepted, identified, escorted to the adequate route or out of the prohibited airspace, or forced to land by military aircraft of the territorial state.

== See also ==
- Deadstick landing
- Hard landing
