= Aerobraking =

Spaceflight maneuver

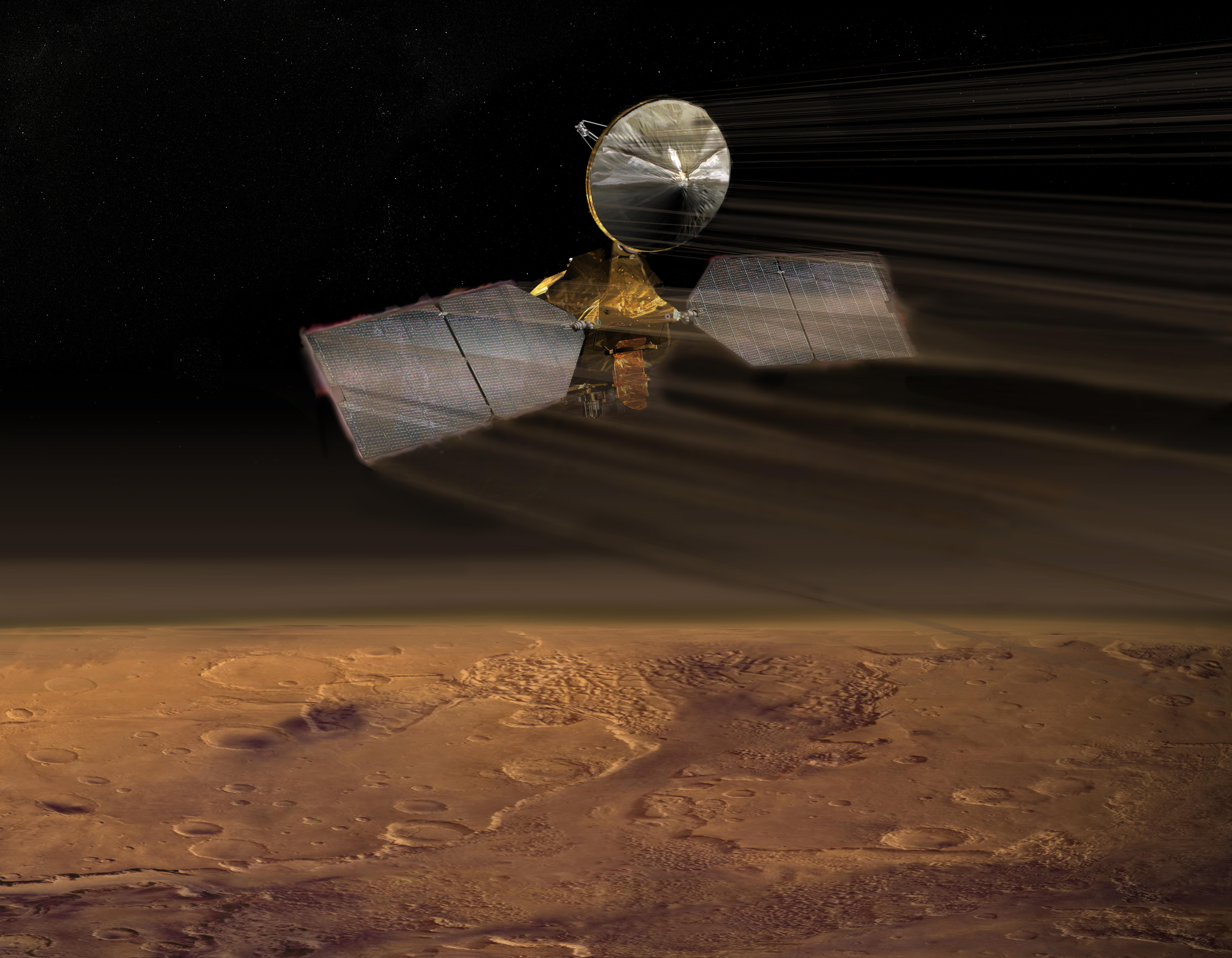
An artist's conception of aerobraking with the Mars Reconnaissance Orbiter

An example of Aerobraking Mars Reconnaissance Orbiter · Mars

Aerobraking is a spaceflight maneuver that reduces the high point of an elliptical orbit (apoapsis) by flying the vehicle through the atmosphere at the low point of the orbit (periapsis). The resulting drag slows the spacecraft. Aerobraking is used when a spacecraft requires a low orbit after arriving at a body with an atmosphere, as it requires less fuel than using propulsion to slow down. A more extreme maneuver is aerocapture, where a spacecraft uses an atmosphere to perform orbit insertion, decelerating from a flyby trajectory.

== Method ==
When an interplanetary vehicle arrives at its destination, it must reduce its velocity to achieve orbit or to land. To reach a low, near-circular orbit around a body with substantial gravity (as is required for many scientific studies), the required velocity changes can be on the order of kilometers per second. Using propulsion, the rocket equation dictates that a large fraction of the spacecraft mass must consist of fuel. This reduces the science payload and/or requires a large and expensive rocket. Provided the target body has an atmosphere, aerobraking can be used to reduce fuel requirements. The use of a relatively small burn allows the spacecraft to enter an elongated elliptic orbit. Aerobraking then shortens the orbit into a circle. If the atmosphere is thick enough, a single pass can be sufficient to adjust the orbit. However, aerobraking typically requires multiple orbits higher in the atmosphere. This reduces the effects of frictional heating, unpredictable turbulence effects, atmospheric composition, and temperature.

Aerobraking done this way allows sufficient time after each pass to measure the velocity change and make corrections for the next pass. Achieving the final orbit may take over six months for Mars, and may require hundreds of passes through the atmosphere. After the last pass, if the spacecraft is to stay in orbit, it must be given more kinetic energy via rocket engines in order to raise the periapsis above the atmosphere. If the craft is to land, it must lose kinetic energy, also via rocket engines.

The kinetic energy dissipated by aerobraking is converted to heat, meaning that spacecraft must dissipate this heat. The spacecraft must have sufficient surface area and structural strength to produce and survive the required drag. The temperatures and pressures associated with aerobraking are not as severe as those of atmospheric reentry or aerocapture. Simulations of the Mars Reconnaissance Orbiter aerobraking use a force limit of 0.35 N per square meter with a spacecraft cross section of about 37 m^{2}, equate to a maximum drag force of about 7.4 N, and a maximum expected temperature as 170 °C. The force density (i.e. pressure), roughly 0.2 N per square meter, that was exerted on the Mars Observer during aerobraking is comparable to the aerodynamic resistance of moving at 0.6 m/s (2.16 km/h) at sea level on Earth, approximately the amount experienced when walking slowly.

Regarding spacecraft navigation, Moriba Jah was the first to demonstrate the ability to process Inertial Measurement Unit (IMU) data collected on board the spacecraft, during aerobraking, using an unscented Kalman Filter to statistically infer the spacecraft's trajectory independent of ground-based measurement data. Jah did this using actual IMU data from Mars Odyssey and Mars Reconnaissance Orbiter. Moreover, this was the first use of an unscented Kalman Filter to determine the orbit of an anthropogenic space object about another planet. This method, which could be used to automate aerobraking navigation, is called Inertial Measurements for Aeroassisted Navigation (IMAN) and Jah won a NASA Space Act Award for this work.

Many spacecraft use solar panels to power their operations. The panels can be used to refine aerobraking to reduce the number of required orbits. The panels rotate according to an AI-powered algorithm to increase/reduce drag and can reduce arrival times from months to weeks.

== Related methods ==
Aerocapture is a related but more extreme method in which no initial orbit-injection burn is performed. Instead, the spacecraft plunges deeply into the atmosphere without an initial insertion burn, and emerges from this single pass in the atmosphere with an apoapsis near that of the desired orbit. Several small correction burns are then used to raise the periapsis and perform final adjustments.

This method was originally planned for the Mars Odyssey orbiter, but the significant design impacts proved too costly.

Another related technique is that of aerogravity assist, in which the spacecraft flies through the upper atmosphere and uses aerodynamic lift instead of drag at the point of closest approach. If correctly oriented, this can increase the deflection angle above that of a pure gravity assist, resulting in a larger delta-v.

== Spacecraft missions ==
Animation of 2001 Mars Odyssey's trajectory around Mars from 24 October 2001 to 24 October 2002 2001 Mars Odyssey · Mars

Animation of ExoMars Trace Gas Orbiter's trajectory around Mars Mars · ExoMars Trace Gas Orbiter

Although the theory of aerobraking is well developed, using the technique is difficult because a very detailed knowledge of the character of the target planet's atmosphere is needed in order to plan the maneuver correctly. Currently, the deceleration is monitored during each maneuver and plans are modified accordingly. Since no spacecraft can yet aerobrake safely on its own, this requires constant attention from both human controllers and the Deep Space Network. This is particularly true near the end of the process, when the drag passes are relatively close together (only about 2 hours apart for Mars). NASA has used aerobraking four times to modify a spacecraft's orbit to one with lower energy, reduced apoapsis altitude, and smaller orbit.

On 19 March 1991, aerobraking was demonstrated by the Hiten spacecraft. This was the first aerobraking maneuver by a deep space probe. Hiten (a.k.a. MUSES-A) was launched by the Institute of Space and Astronautical Science (ISAS) of Japan. Hiten flew by the Earth at an altitude of 125.5 km over the Pacific at 11.0 km/s. Atmospheric drag lowered the velocity by 1.712 m/s and the apogee altitude by 8665 km. Another aerobraking maneuver was conducted on 30 March.

In May 1993, aerobraking was used during the extended Venusian mission of the Magellan spacecraft. It was used to circularize the orbit of the spacecraft in order to increase the precision of the measurement of the gravity field. The entire gravity field was mapped from the circular orbit during a 243-day cycle of the extended mission. During the termination phase of the mission, a "windmill experiment" was performed: Atmospheric molecular pressure exerts a torque via the windmill-sail-like oriented solar cell wings, the necessary counter-torque to keep the probe from spinning is measured.

In 1997, the Mars Global Surveyor (MGS) orbiter was the first spacecraft to use aerobraking as the main planned technique of orbit adjustment. The MGS used the data gathered from the Magellan mission to Venus to plan its aerobraking technique. The spacecraft used its solar panels as "wings" to control its passage through the tenuous upper atmosphere of Mars and lower the apoapsis of its orbit over the course of many months. Unfortunately, a structural failure shortly after launch severely damaged one of the MGS's solar panels and necessitated a higher aerobraking altitude (and hence one third the force) than originally planned, significantly extending the time required to attain the desired orbit. More recently, aerobraking was used by the Mars Odyssey and Mars Reconnaissance Orbiter spacecraft, in both cases without incident.

In 2014, an aerobraking experiment was successfully performed on a test basis near the end of the mission of the ESA probe Venus Express.

In 2017–2018, the ESA ExoMars Trace Gas Orbiter performed aerobraking at Mars to reduce the apocentre of the orbit, being the first operational aerobraking for a European mission.

Mars Lander Mission is a future mission by ISRO, which is proposed to use aerobraking to reduce its apoapsis.

== Aerobraking in fiction ==
In Robert A. Heinlein's 1948 novel Space Cadet, aerobraking is used to save fuel while slowing the spacecraft Aes Triplex for an unplanned extended mission and landing on Venus, during a transit from the Asteroid Belt to Earth.

The spacecraft Cosmonaut Alexei Leonov in Arthur C. Clarke's 1982 novel 2010: Odyssey Two and its 1984 film adaptation uses aerobraking in the upper layers of Jupiter's atmosphere to establish itself at the L_{1} Lagrangian point of the Jupiter – Io system.

In the 2004 TV series Space Odyssey: Voyage to the Planets the crew of the international spacecraft Pegasus perform an aerobraking manoeuvre in Jupiter's upper atmosphere to slow them down enough to enter Jovian orbit.

In the fourth episode of Stargate Universe, the Ancient ship Destiny suffers an almost complete loss of power and must use aerobraking to change course. The 2009 episode ends in a cliffhanger with Destiny headed directly toward a star.

In the space simulation sandbox game Kerbal Space Program, this is a common method of reducing a craft's orbital speed. It is sometimes humorously referred to as "aerobreaking", because the high drag sometimes causes large crafts to split in several parts.

In Kim Stanley Robinson's Mars trilogy, the Ares spaceship carrying the first hundred humans to arrive on Mars uses aerobraking to enter into orbit around the planet. Later in the books, as an effort to thicken the atmosphere, scientists bring an asteroid into aerobraking in order to vaporize it and release its contents into the atmosphere.

In the 2014 film Interstellar, astronaut pilot Cooper uses aerobraking to save fuel and slow the spacecraft Ranger upon exiting the wormhole to arrive in orbit above the first planet.

== See also ==
- Aerocapture
- Boost-glide
- Lithobraking
- Magnetohydrodynamic aerobraking
