= Aeroshell =

Shell which protects a spacecraft during atmospheric reentry

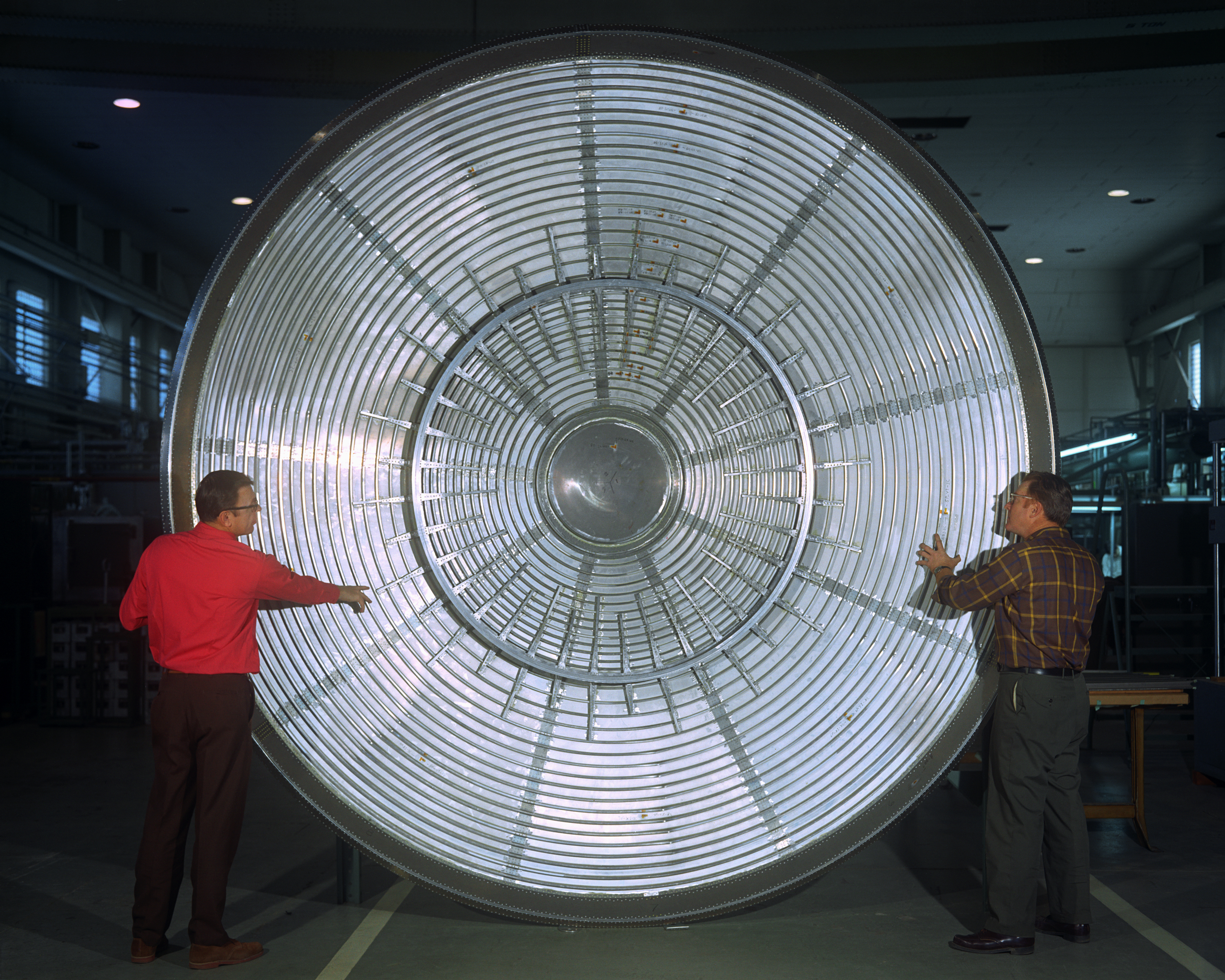
Viking 1 aeroshell

An aeroshell is a rigid heat-shielded shell that helps decelerate and protects a spacecraft vehicle from pressure, heat, and possible debris created by drag during atmospheric entry. Its main components consist of a heat shield (the forebody) and a back shell. The heat shield absorbs heat caused by air compression in front of the spacecraft during its atmospheric entry. The back shell carries the load being delivered, along with important components such as a parachute, rocket engines, and monitoring electronics like an inertial measurement unit that monitors the orientation of the shell during parachute-slowed descent.

Its purpose is used during the EDL, or Entry, Descent, and Landing, process of a spacecraft's flight. First, the aeroshell decelerates the spacecraft as it penetrates the planet's atmosphere and must necessarily dissipate the kinetic energy of the very high orbital speed. The heat shield absorbs some of this energy while much is also dissipated into the atmospheric gasses, mostly by radiation. During the latter stages of descent, a parachute is typically deployed and any heat shield is detached. Rockets may be located at the back shell to assist in control or to retropropulsively slow descent. Airbags may also be inflated to cushion impact with the ground, in which case the spacecraft could bounce on the planet's surface after the first impact. In many cases, communication throughout the process is relayed or recorded for subsequent transfer.

Aeroshells are a key component of space probes that must land intact on the surface of any object with an atmosphere. They have been used on the majority of missions returning payloads to the Earth. They are also used for all landing missions to Mars, Venus, Titan and (in the most extreme case) the Galileo probe to Jupiter. The size and geometry of an aeroshell is driven by the requirements of the EDL phase of its mission, as these parameters heavily influence its performance.

== Components ==
The aeroshell consists of two main components: the heat shield, or forebody, which is located at the front of the aeroshell, and the back shell, which is located at the back of the aeroshell. The heat shield of the aeroshell faces the ram direction (forward) during a spacecraft's atmospheric entry, allowing it to absorb the high heat caused by compression of air in front of the craft. The backshell acts as a finalizer for the encapsulation of the payload. The backshell typically contains a parachute, pyrotechnic devices along with their electronics and batteries, an inertial measurement unit, and other hardware needed for the specific mission's entry, descent, and landing sequence. The parachute is located at the apex of the back shell and slows the spacecraft during EDL. The pyrotechnic control system releases devices such as nuts, rockets, and the parachute mortar. The inertial measurement unit reports the orientation of the back shell while it is swaying underneath the parachute. Retrorockets, if equipped, can assist in the terminal descent and landing of the spacecraft vehicle; alternatively or additionally, a lander may have retrorockets mounted on its own body for terminal descent and landing use (after the backshell has been jettisoned). Other rockets may be equipped to provide horizontal force to the back shell, helping to orient it to a more vertical position during the main retrorocket burn.

== Design factors ==
A spacecraft's mission objective determines what flight requirements are needed to ensure mission success. These flight requirements are deceleration, heating, and impact and landing accuracy. A spacecraft must have a maximum value of deceleration low enough to keep the weakest points of its vehicle intact but high enough to penetrate the atmosphere without rebounding. Spacecraft structure and payload mass affect how much maximum deceleration it can stand. This force is represented by "g's", or Earth's gravitational acceleration. If its structure is well-designed enough and made from robust material (such as steel), then it can withstand a higher amount of g's. However, payload needs to be considered. Just because the spacecraft's structure can withstand high g's does not mean its payload can. For example, a payload of astronauts can only withstand approximately 9 g's, or 9 times their weight. Values that are more than this baseline increase risk of brain injury or death. It must also be able to withstand high temperature caused by the immense friction resulting from entering the atmosphere at hypersonic speed. Finally, it must be able to penetrate an atmosphere and land on a terrain accurately, without missing its target. A more constricted landing area calls for more strict accuracy. In such cases, a spacecraft will be more streamlined and possess a steeper re-entry trajectory angle. These factors combine to affect the re-entry corridor, the area in which a spacecraft must travel in order to avoid burning up or rebounding out of an atmosphere. All of these above requirements are met through the consideration, design, and adjustment of a spacecraft's structure and trajectory. Future missions, however are making use of atmospheric rebound, allowing re-entry capsules to travel further during their decent, and land in more convenient locations.

The overall dynamics of aeroshells are influenced by inertial and drag forces, as defined it this equation: ß=m/CdA where m is defined as the mass of the aeroshell and its respective loads and CdA is defined as the amount of drag force an aeroshell can generate during a freestream condition. Overall, β is defined as mass divided by drag force (mass per unit drag area). A higher mass per unit drag area causes aeroshell entry, descent, and landing to happen at low and dense points of the atmosphere and also reduces the elevation capability and the timeline margin for landing. This is because a higher mass/drag area means the spacecraft does not have sufficient drag to slow down early in its decent, relying on the thicker atmosphere found at lower altitudes for the majority of its deceleration. Furthermore, higher mass/drag ratios mean less mass can be allocated to the spacecraft's payload which will have secondary impacts on funding and mission's science goals. Factors that increase during EDL include heat load and rate, which causes the system to forcefully accommodate the increase in thermal loads. This situation reduces the useful landed mass capability of entry, descent, and landing because an increase in thermal load leads to a heavier support structure and thermal protection system (TPS) of the aeroshell. Static stability also needs to be taken into consideration as it is necessary to maintain a high-drag altitude. This is why a swept aeroshell forebody as opposed to a blunt one is required; the previous shape ensures this factor's existence but also reduces drag area. Thus, there is a resulting tradeoff between drag and stability that affects the design of an aeroshell's shape. Lift-to-drag ratio is also another factor that needs to be considered. The ideal level for a lift-to-drag ration is at non-zero. Maintaining a non-zero L/D ratio allows for a higher parachute deployment altitude and reduced loads during deceleration.

== Planetary Entry Parachute Program ==
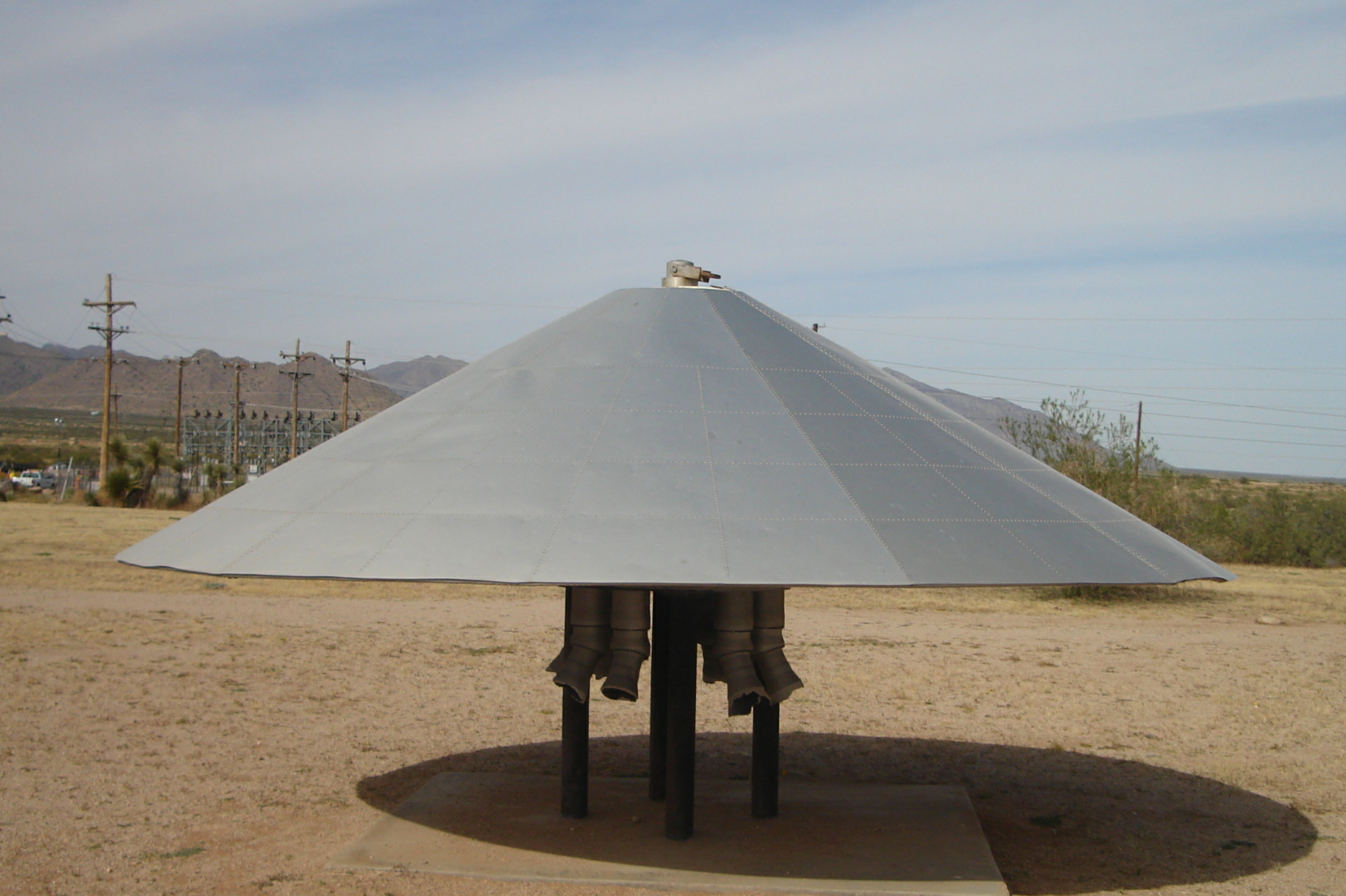
USAF Aeroshell "Flying Saucer" on public display in Missile Park at White Sands Missile Range.

NASA's Planetary Entry Parachute Program (PEPP) aeroshell, tested in 1966, was created to test parachutes for the Voyager Mars landing program. To simulate the thin Martian atmosphere, the parachute needed to be used at an altitude more than 160,000 feet (49,000 m) above the Earth. A balloon launched from Roswell, New Mexico was used to initially lift the aeroshell. The balloon then drifted west to the White Sands Missile Range, where the vehicle was dropped and the engines beneath the vehicle boosted it to the required altitude, where the parachute was deployed.

The Voyager program was later canceled, replaced by the much smaller Viking program several years later. NASA reused the Voyager name for the Voyager 1 and Voyager 2 probes to the outer planets, which had nothing to do with the Mars Voyager program.

== Low-Density Supersonic Decelerator ==
The Low-Density Supersonic Decelerator or LDSD is a space vehicle designed to create atmospheric drag in order to decelerate during entry through a planet's atmosphere. It is essentially a disc-shaped vehicle containing an inflatable, doughnut-shaped balloon around the outside. The use of this type of system may allow an increase in the payload.

It is intended to be used to help a spacecraft decelerate before landing on Mars. This is done by inflating the balloon around the vehicle to increase the surface area and create atmospheric drag. After sufficient deceleration, a parachute on a long tether deploys to further slow the vehicle.

The vehicle is being developed and tested by NASA's Jet Propulsion Laboratory. Mark Adler is the project manager.

=== June 2014 test flight ===
Video of the 2014 test flight

The test flight took place on June 28, 2014, with the test vehicle launching from the United States Navy's Pacific Missile Range Facility in Kauaʻi, Hawaiʻi, at 18:45 UTC (08:45 local). A high-altitude helium balloon, which when fully inflated has a volume of 1,120,000 cubic meters (39,570,000 ft^{3}), lifted the vehicle to around 37,000 meters (120,000 ft). The vehicle detached at 21:05 UTC (11:05 local), and four small, solid-fuel rocket motors spun up the vehicle to provide stability.

A half second after spin-up, the vehicle's Star 48B solid-fuel motor ignited, powering the vehicle to Mach 4 and an altitude of approximately 55,000 meters (180,000 ft). Immediately after rocket burn-out, four more rocket motors despun the vehicle. Upon slowing to Mach 3.8, the 6-meter (20 ft) tube-shaped Supersonic Inflatable Aerodynamic Decelerator (SIAD-R configuration) deployed. SIAD is intended to increase atmospheric drag on the vehicle by increasing the surface area of its leading side, thus increasing the rate of deceleration.

Upon slowing to Mach 2.5 (around 107 seconds after SIAD deployment), the Supersonic Disk Sail (SSDS) parachute was deployed to slow the vehicle further. This parachute measures 33.5 meters (110 ft) in diameter, nearly twice as large as the one used for the Mars Science Laboratory mission. However, it began tearing apart after deployment, and the vehicle impacted the Pacific Ocean at 21:35 UTC (11:35 local) travelling 32 to 48 kilometers per hour (20 to 30 mph). All hardware and data recorders were recovered. Despite the parachute incident, the mission was declared a success; the primary goal was proving the flight worthiness of the test vehicle, while SIAD and SSDS were secondary experiments.

=== 2015 test flights ===
Two more test flights of LDSD took place in mid-2015 at the Pacific Missile Range Facility. They focused on the 8-meter (26 ft) SIAD-E and SSDS technologies, incorporating lessons learned during the 2014 test. Changes planned for the parachute include a rounder shape and structural reinforcement. Shortly after re-entry, however, the parachute was torn away.

== Gallery ==
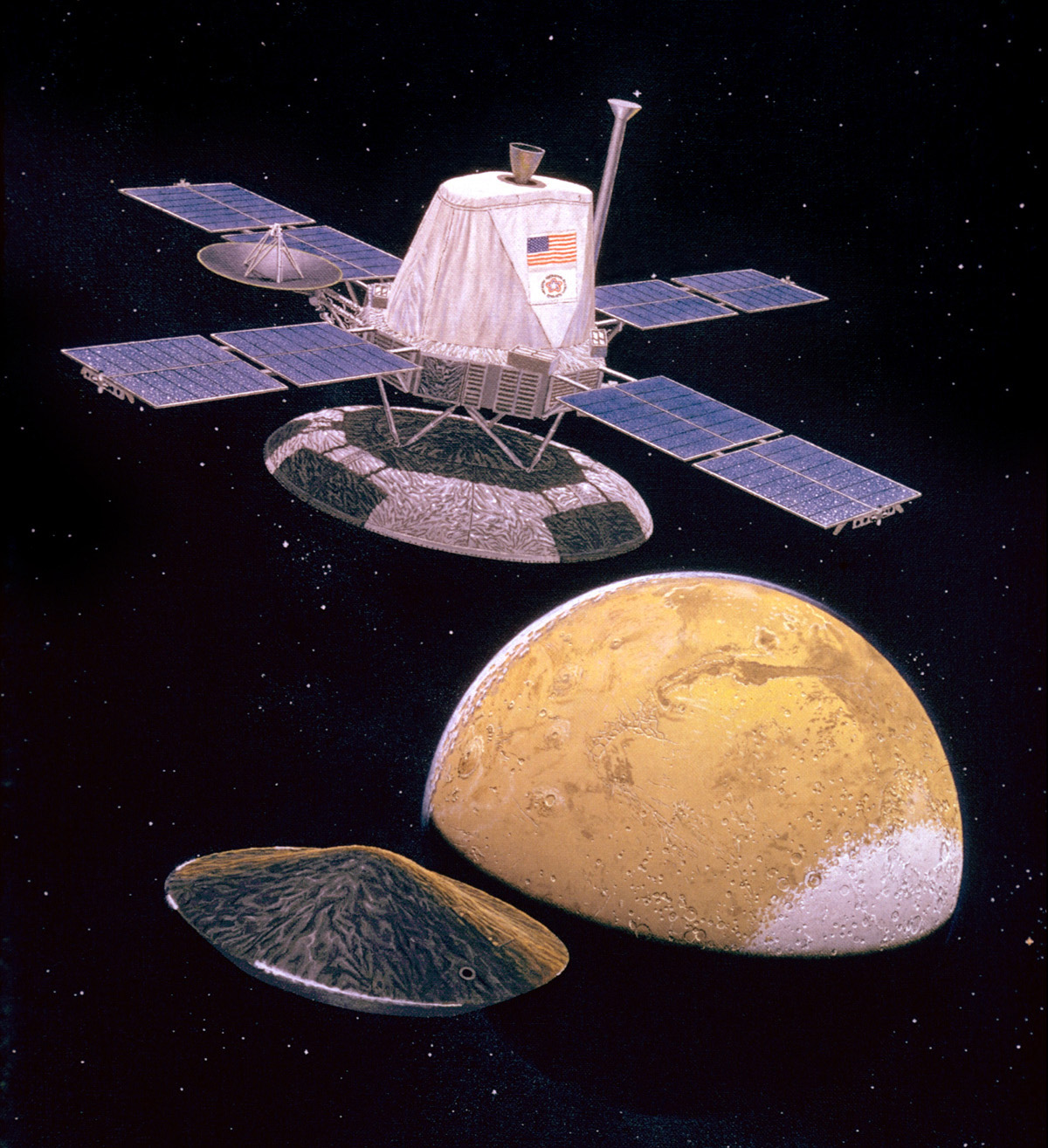
Artist impression of the Viking Orbiter releasing the aeroshell-clad lander (Don Davis).

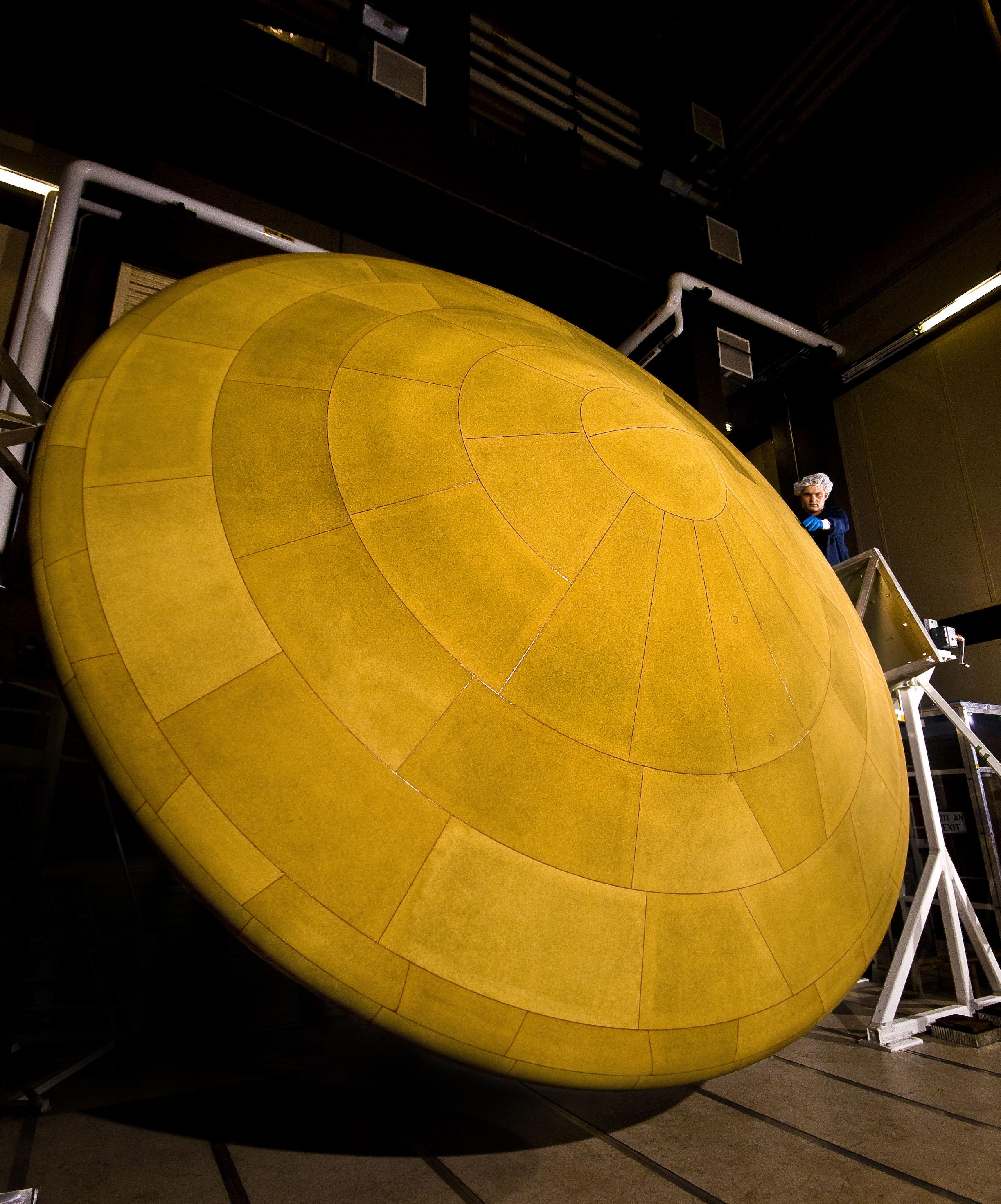
Mars Science Laboratory giant heat shield.

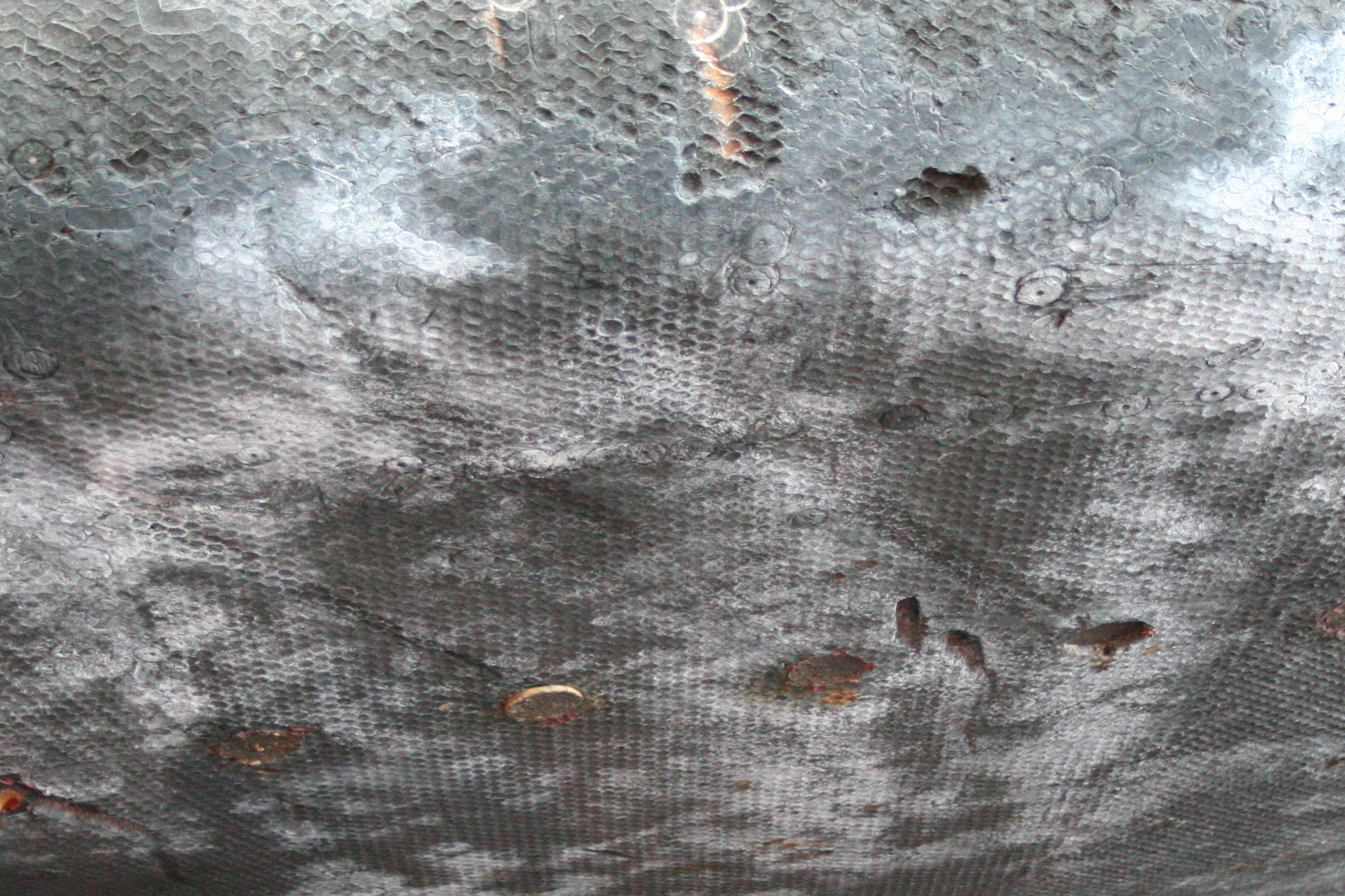
Detail of Apollo 12 heat shield on display at the Virginia Air and Space Museum.

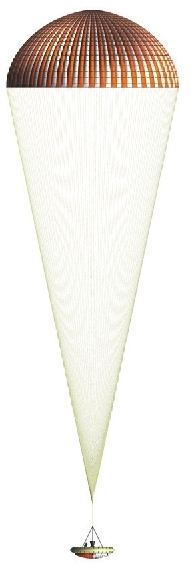
33.5-meter Supersonic Ring Sail Parachute

6-meter SIAD-R

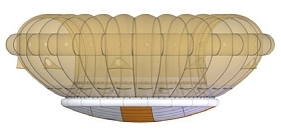
8-meter SIAD-E
