= Hypercone (spacecraft) =

Spaceflight mechanism

A hypercone is a mechanism for atmospheric reentry deceleration proposed for use by future Mars landing missions. It is an inflatable structure combining characteristics of both heat shields and parachutes.

The hypercone is intended to supplement other deceleration mechanisms, bridging a gap in capability between conventional heat shields (which are useful for taking a spacecraft from orbital velocity down to several times the speed of sound) and conventional parachutes or landing rockets (which are only useful below the speed of sound). Mars' combination of thin atmospheric density and relatively large gravity makes it impossible for a conventional heat shield to brake landing capsules of more than a few tons' mass to subsonic velocity before they would impact the surface.

A hypercone consists of a large donut-shaped balloon that supports a cone-shaped sheet of heat-resistant fabric thirty to forty meters in diameter, with the capsule located at the point of the cone. The balloon is rapidly inflated to expand the cone to full size and the resulting drag slows the capsule to a velocity where other landing mechanisms can finish the job of bringing it to a soft landing.

NASA's Low Density Supersonic Decelerator (LDSD) program is testing out some of these new devices and in April 2012 performed a trial run on a rocket sled test to replicate the forces a supersonic spacecraft would experience prior to landing.
