= Low-Density Supersonic Decelerator =

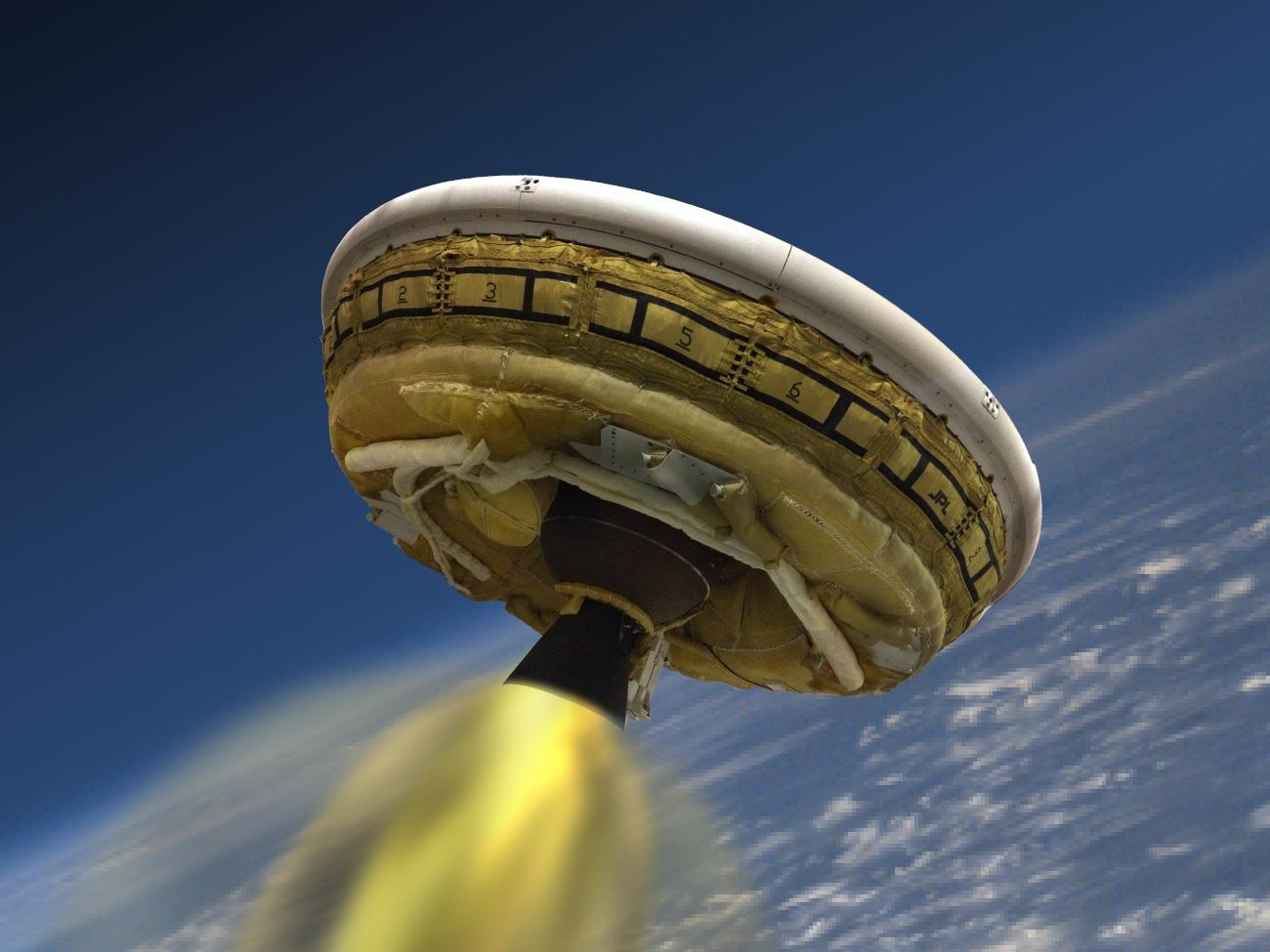
- Artist's rendering of LDSD test vehicle in flight
- Manufacturer: Jet Propulsion Laboratory
- Country of origin: United States
- Operator: NASA
- Applications: Technology demonstrator

Specifications
- Spacecraft type: Hypercone
- Launch mass: 3,120 kg (6,878 lb)
- Dimensions: Diameter: 4.7 m (15 ft 5 in)
- Regime: Suborbital

Production
- Status: In production
- On order: 0
- Built: 3
- Launched: 2
- Maiden launch: June 28, 2014

The Low-Density Supersonic Decelerator or LDSD is a reentry vehicle designed to test techniques for atmospheric entry on Mars. The disc-shaped LDSD uses an inflatable structure called the Supersonic Inflatable Aerodynamic Decelerator (SIAD), which is essentially a donut-shaped balloon, to create atmospheric drag in order to decelerate the vehicle before deploying a large supersonic parachute. The goal of the $230 m project is to develop a reentry system capable of landing 2- to 3-ton payloads on Mars, as opposed to the 1-ton limit of the currently used systems.

The vehicle is being developed and tested by NASA's Jet Propulsion Laboratory. Mark Adler is the project manager.

The vehicle was tested in 2014 and 2015.

== June 2014 test flight ==
Video of the 2014 test flight

The test flight took place on June 28, 2014, with the test vehicle launching from the United States Navy's Pacific Missile Range Facility on Kauaʻi, Hawaiʻi, at 18:45 UTC (08:45 local). A high-altitude helium balloon, which when fully inflated has a volume of 975,000 cubic meters (34,430,000 ft^{3}), lifted the vehicle to 36,500 meters (119,900 ft). The vehicle detached at 21:05 UTC (11:05 local), and four small, solid-fuel rocket motors spun up the vehicle to provide stability.

A half second after spin-up, the vehicle's Star 48B solid-fuel motor ignited, powering the vehicle to Mach 4.32 and a peak altitude of 58,200 meters (190,900 ft). Immediately after rocket burn-out, four more rocket motors despun the vehicle. Upon slowing to Mach 4.08, the 6-meter (20 ft) tube-shaped Supersonic Inflatable Aerodynamic Decelerator (SIAD-R configuration) deployed. SIAD is intended to increase atmospheric drag on the vehicle by increasing the surface area of its leading side, thus increasing the rate of deceleration.

Upon slowing to Mach 2.54 (around 86 seconds after SIAD deployment), the Supersonic Disksail (SSDS) parachute was deployed to slow the vehicle further. This parachute measures 30.5 meters (100 ft) in diameter, twice the area of the one used for the Mars Science Laboratory mission. However, it began tearing apart after deployment, and the vehicle impacted the Pacific Ocean at 21:35 UTC (11:35 local) travelling 32 to 48 kilometers per hour (20 to 30 mph). All hardware and data recorders were recovered. Despite the parachute incident, the mission was declared a success; the primary goal was proving the flight worthiness of the test vehicle, while SIAD and SSDS were secondary experiments.

== 2015 test flights ==
A second test flight of LDSD took place in June 2015, at the Pacific Missile Range Facility. This test focused on the 6-meter (20 ft) SIAD-R and Supersonic Ringsail (SSRS) technologies, incorporating lessons learned during the 2014 test. Changes planned for the parachute included a rounder shape and structural reinforcement. After several weather-related scrubs, the flight occurred on June 8. As in the first test, the SIAD structure inflated successfully but the parachute was damaged during deployment, this time after 600 ms and at 80,000 pounds (36,000 kg) drag.

== After 2015 ==
A 3rd test was expected in 2016, after some smaller scale tests with sounding rockets.

The parachute team wanted Mars 2020 to have a camera on the parachute deployment and opening in 2021.

== Gallery ==
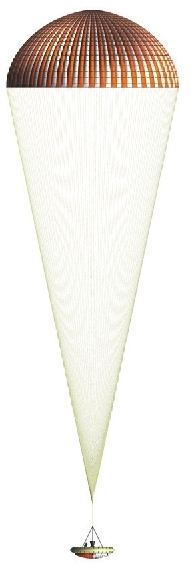
33.5-meter Supersonic Ring Sail Parachute

6-meter SIAD-R

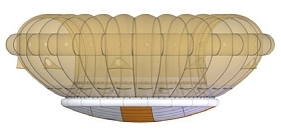
8-meter SIAD-E

== See also ==
- HIAD, NASA's Hypersonic Inflatable Aerodynamic Decelerator
- LOFTID, 2022 test from Earth orbit
- Rockoon
