= Cassini–Huygens =

Mission to Saturn (1997–2017)

- Artist's concept of Cassini's orbit insertion around Saturn
- Names: Saturn Orbiter and Titan Probe (SOTP)
- Mission type: Cassini: Saturn orbiter Huygens: Titan lander
- Operator: Cassini: NASA / JPL; Huygens: ESA / ASI
- COSPAR ID: 1997-061A
- SATCAT no.: 25008
- Website: NASA; ESA
- Mission duration: Overall: 19 years, 335 days; 13 years, 76 days at Saturn; En route: 6 years, 261 days; Prime mission: 3 years; Extended missions: Equinox: 2 years, 62 days; Solstice: 6 years, 205 days; Finale: 4 months, 24 days
- Distance travelled: 7.9 billion km (4.9 billion mi)

Spacecraft properties
- Manufacturer: Cassini: JPL; Huygens: Aerospatiale
- Launch mass: 5,712 kg (12,593 lb)
- Dry mass: 2,523 kg (5,562 lb)
- Power: ~885 watts (at launch); ~670 watts (2010); ~663 watts (at end of mission)

Start of mission
- Launch date: October 15, 1997, 08:43:00 UTC
- Rocket: Titan IV-B / Centaur D‑1T (B-33)
- Launch site: Cape Canaveral, SLC-40
- Contractor: Lockheed Martin

End of mission
- Disposal: Controlled entry into Saturn
- Last contact: September 15, 2017: 11:55:39 UTC X-band telemetry; 11:55:46 UTC S-band radio science

Orbital parameters
- Reference system: Kronocentric

Flyby of Venus (Gravity assist)
- Closest approach: April 26, 1998
- Distance: 283 km (176 mi)

Flyby of Venus (Gravity assist)
- Closest approach: June 24, 1999
- Distance: 623 km (387 mi)

Flyby of Earth-Moon system (Gravity assist)
- Closest approach: August 18, 1999, 03:28 UTC
- Distance: 1,171 km (728 mi)

Flyby of 2685 Masursky (Incidental)
- Closest approach: January 23, 2000
- Distance: 1,600,000 km (990,000 mi)

Flyby of Jupiter (Gravity assist)
- Closest approach: December 30, 2000
- Distance: 9,852,924 km (6,122,323 mi)

Saturn orbiter
- Spacecraft component: Cassini
- Orbital insertion: July 1, 2004, 02:48 UTC
- Orbits: 294

Titan lander
- Spacecraft component: Huygens
- Landing date: January 14, 2005
- Landing site: 10.573°S 192.335°W
- Large Strategic Science Missions; Planetary Science Division

Cassini–Huygens (/kəˈsiːni ˈhɔɪɡənz/ kə-SEE-nee HOY-gənz), commonly called Cassini, was a joint space-research mission by NASA, the European Space Agency (ESA), and the Italian Space Agency (ASI) to send a space probe to study the planet Saturn and its system, including its rings and natural satellites. The Flagship-class robotic spacecraft comprised both NASA's Cassini space probe and ESA's Huygens lander, which landed on Saturn's largest moon, Titan. Cassini was the fourth space probe to visit Saturn and the first to enter its orbit, where it stayed from 2004 to 2017. The two craft took their names from the astronomers Giovanni Cassini and Christiaan Huygens.

Launched aboard a Titan IV-B with a Centaur D-1T upper stage on October 15, 1997, Cassini was active in space for nearly 20 years, spending almost 7 years in transit and 13 years orbiting Saturn, studying the planet and its system after entering orbit on July 1, 2004.

The voyage to Saturn included flybys of Venus (April 1998 and July 1999), Earth (August 1999), the asteroid 2685 Masursky, and Jupiter (December 2000). The mission ended on September 15, 2017, when Cassini's trajectory took it into Saturn's upper atmosphere and it burned up in order to prevent any risk of contaminating Saturn's moons, which might have offered habitable environments to stowaway terrestrial microbes on the spacecraft. The mission was successful beyond expectations – NASA's Planetary Science Division Director, Jim Green, described Cassini–Huygens as a "mission of firsts" that revolutionized human understanding of the Saturn system, including its moons and rings, and our understanding of where life might be found in the Solar System.

== Overview ==
=== Planning and development ===
Scientists and individuals from 27 countries made up the joint team responsible for designing, building, flying and collecting data from the Cassini orbiter and the Huygens probe.

Cassini's planners originally scheduled a mission of four years, from June 2004 to May 2008. The mission was extended for another two years until September 2010, branded the Cassini Equinox Mission. The mission was extended a second and final time with the Cassini Solstice Mission, lasting another seven years until September 15, 2017, on which date Cassini was de-orbited to burn up in Saturn's upper atmosphere. The Huygens module traveled with Cassini until its separation from the probe on December 25, 2004; Huygens landed by parachute on Titan on January 14, 2005. The separation was facilitated by the SED (Spin/Eject device), which provided a relative separation speed of 0.35 metres per second (1.1 ft/s) and a spin rate of 7.5 rpm. It returned data to Earth for around 90 minutes, using the orbiter as a relay. This was the first landing ever accomplished in the outer Solar System and the first landing on a moon other than Earth's Moon.

At the end of its mission, the Cassini spacecraft executed its "Grand Finale": a number of risky passes through the gaps between Saturn and its inner rings. This phase aimed to maximize Cassini's scientific outcome before the spacecraft was intentionally destroyed to prevent potential contamination of Saturn's moons if Cassini were to unintentionally crash into them when maneuvering the probe was no longer possible due to power loss or other communication issues at the end of its operational lifespan. Cassini's atmospheric entry on Saturn ended the mission, but analysis of the returned data will continue for many years.

=== NASA and JPL ===
NASA's Jet Propulsion Laboratory, which developed the orbiter, managed the mission. The European Space Research and Technology Centre developed Huygens. The centre's prime contractor, Aérospatiale of France (which became part of Thales Alenia Space in 2005), assembled the probe with equipment and instruments supplied by many European countries (including Huygens's batteries and two scientific instruments from the United States). The Italian Space Agency (ASI) provided the Cassini orbiter's high-gain radio antenna, with the incorporation of a low-gain antenna (to ensure telecommunications with the Earth for the entire duration of the mission), a compact and lightweight radar, which also used the high-gain antenna and served as a synthetic-aperture radar, a radar altimeter, a radiometer, the radio science subsystem (RSS), and the visible-channel portion VIMS-V of VIMS spectrometer.

The 90s were difficult years for NASA and JPL: with the Cold War and the Space Race between the US and the USSR finished, NASA saw dwindling budgets and introduced the so-called "faster, better, cheaper" approach, that encouraged smaller, cheaper missions built with the help of third-party contractors, efficiently "commercializing" the research lab and forcing it to work with industry. Caltech leadership even feared that JPL could be closed.

JPL had little experience in small missions at the time: its "flagship" missions, like Voyager, Cassini, and Galileo, employed hundreds of people for decades. Cassini "directly supported maybe 500 work-years, about 10 percent of total lab staff [and] provided close to 20 percent of the lab budget". In order to comply with budget restrictions and save the mission, Cassini was downsized; to save $250 million, the scan platform had to be removed from the plans.

NASA provided the VIMS infrared counterpart, as well as the Main Electronic Assembly, which included electronic sub-assemblies provided by CNES of France. On April 16, 2008, NASA announced a two-year extension of the funding for ground operations of this mission, at which point it was renamed the Cassini Equinox Mission. It was extended again in February 2010 as the Cassini Solstice Mission.

== Naming ==
The mission consisted of two main elements: the ASI/NASA Cassini orbiter, named for the Italian astronomer Giovanni Domenico Cassini, the discoverer of Saturn's ring divisions and four of its satellites; and the ESA-developed Huygens probe, named for the Dutch astronomer, mathematician and physicist Christiaan Huygens, discoverer of Titan.

The mission was commonly called Saturn Orbiter Titan Probe (SOTP) during gestation, both as a Mariner Mark II mission and generically.

Cassini–Huygens was a Flagship-class mission to the outer planets. The other planetary flagships include Galileo, Voyager, and Viking.

== Objectives ==
Cassini had several objectives, including:

- Determining the three-dimensional structure and dynamic behavior of the rings of Saturn.
- Determining the composition of the satellite surfaces and the geological history of each object.
- Determining the nature and origin of the dark material on Iapetus's leading hemisphere.
- Measuring the three-dimensional structure and dynamic behavior of the magnetosphere.
- Studying the dynamic behavior of Saturn's atmosphere at cloud level.
- Studying the time variability of Titan's clouds and hazes.
- Characterizing Titan's surface on a regional scale.

Cassini–Huygens was launched on October 15, 1997, from Cape Canaveral Air Force Station's Space Launch Complex 40 using a U.S. Air Force Titan IVB/Centaur rocket. The complete launcher was made up of a two-stage Titan IV booster rocket, two strap-on solid rocket engines, the Centaur upper stage, and a payload enclosure, or fairing.

The total cost of this scientific exploration mission was about US$3.26 billion, including $1.4 billion for pre-launch development, $704 million for mission operations, $54 million for tracking and $422 million for the launch vehicle. The United States contributed $2.6 billion (80%), the ESA $500 million (15%), and the ASI $160 million (5%). However, these figures are from the press kit which was prepared in October 2000. They do not include inflation over the course of a very long mission, nor do they include the cost of the extended missions.

The primary mission for Cassini was completed on July 30, 2008. The mission was extended to June 2010 (Cassini Equinox Mission). This studied the Saturn system in detail during the planet's equinox, which happened in August 2009.

On February 3, 2010, NASA announced another extension for Cassini, lasting 6 1/2 years until 2017, ending at the time of summer solstice in Saturn's northern hemisphere (Cassini Solstice Mission). The extension enabled another 155 revolutions around the planet, 54 flybys of Titan and 11 flybys of Enceladus. In 2017, an encounter with Titan changed its orbit in such a way that, at closest approach to Saturn, it was only 3,000 km (1,900 mi) above the planet's cloudtops, below the inner edge of the D ring. This sequence of "proximal orbits" ended when its final encounter with Titan sent the probe into Saturn's atmosphere to be destroyed.

=== Destinations ===
Selected destinations (ordered largest to smallest but not to scale)

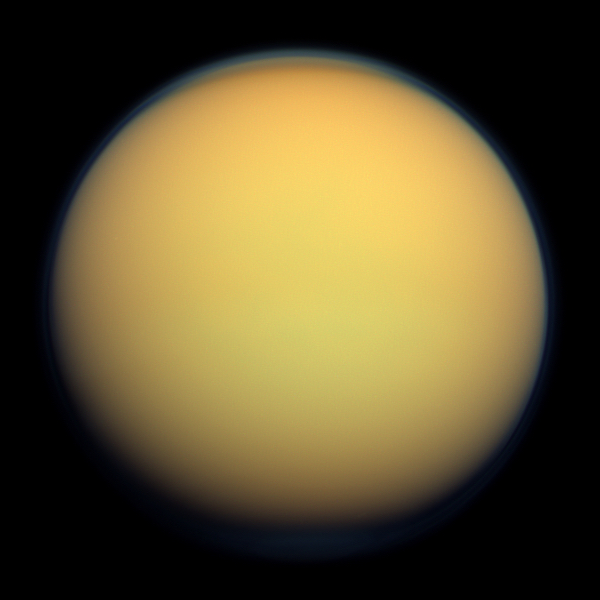
Titan

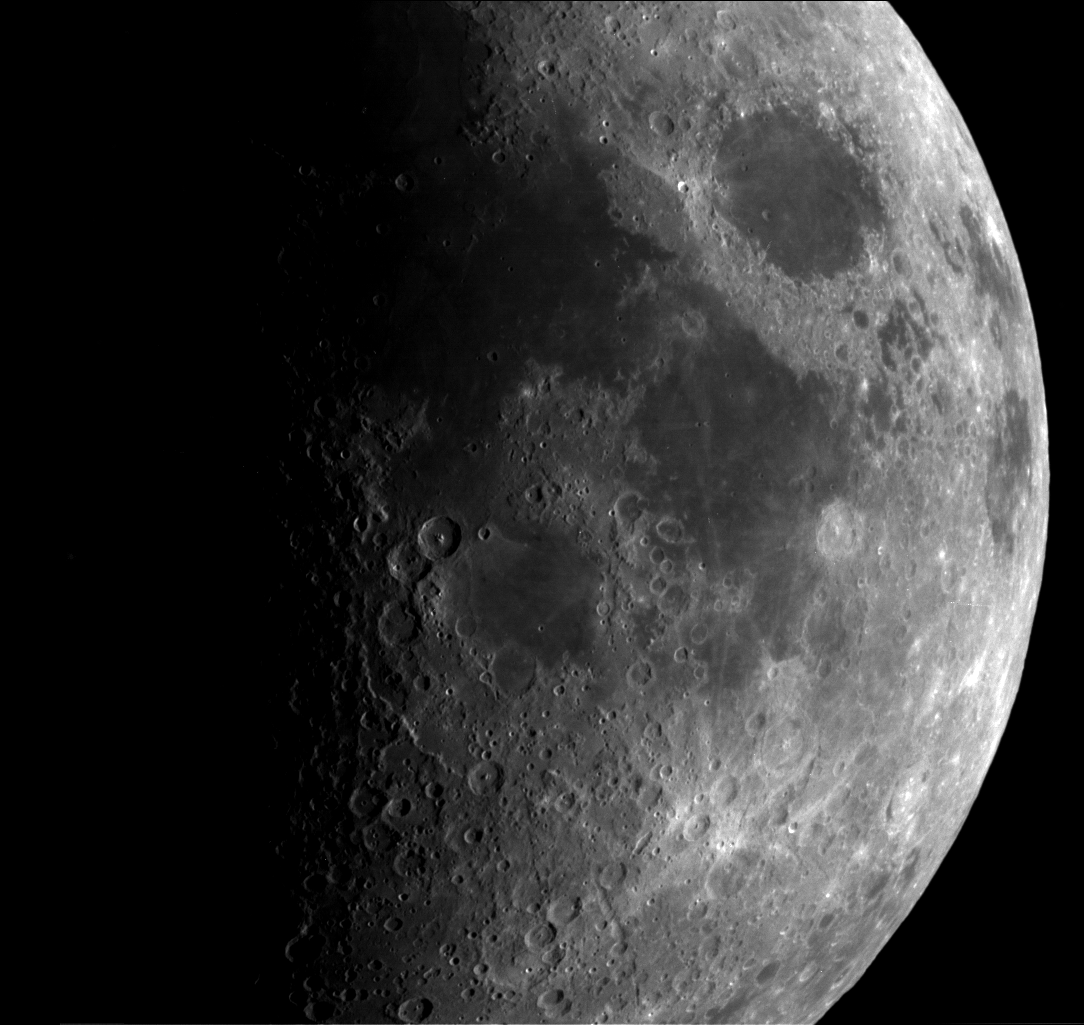
Earth's Moon

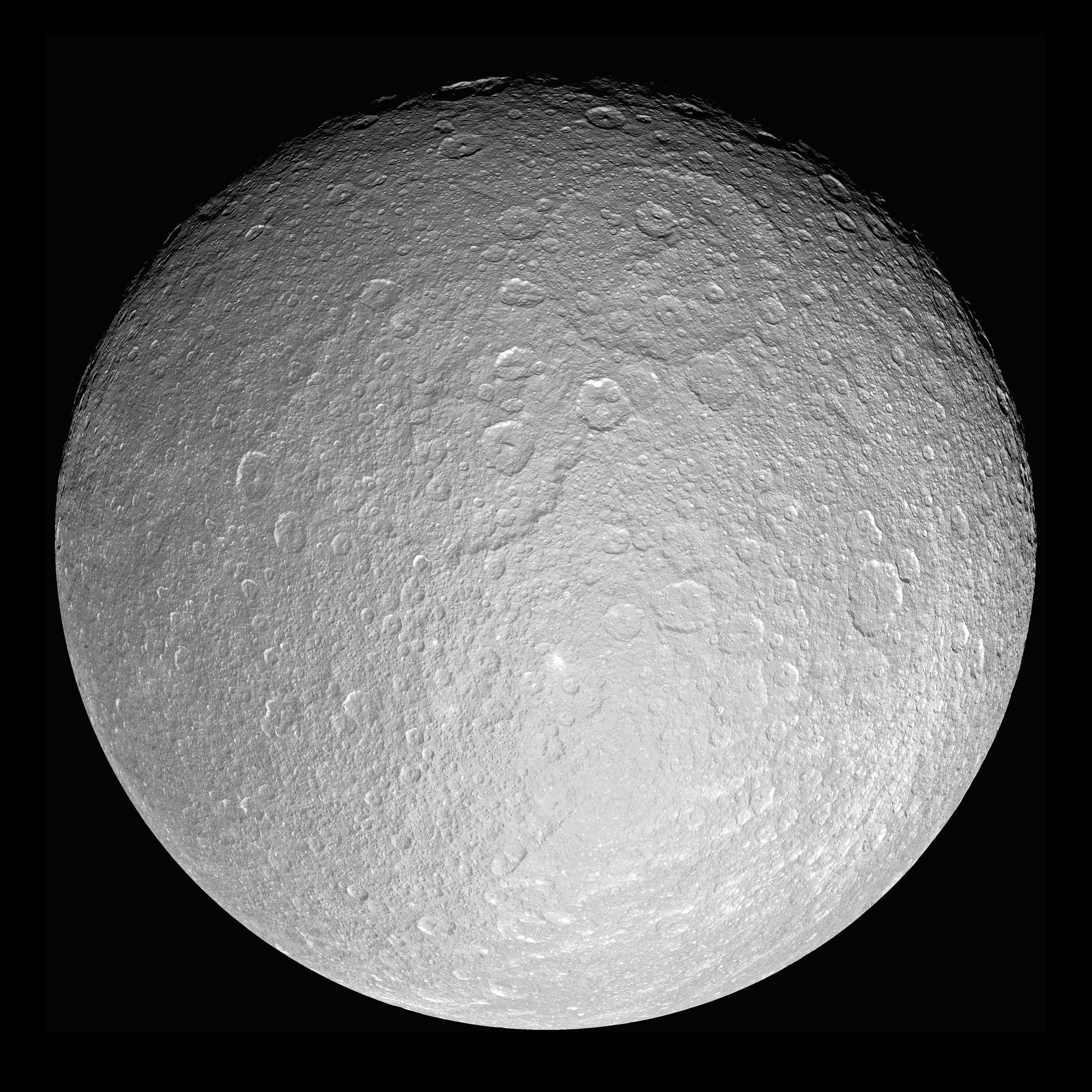
Rhea

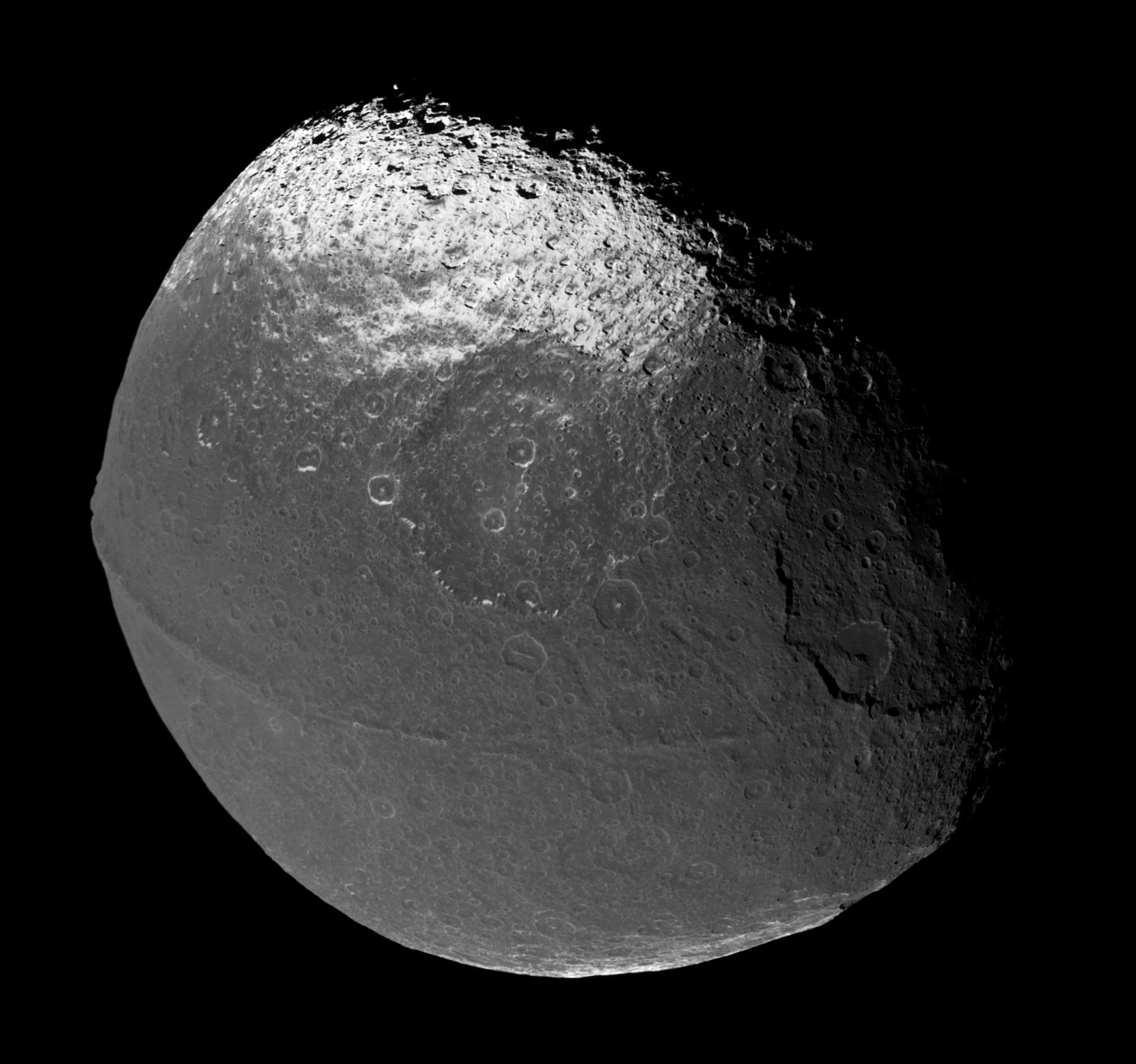
Iapetus

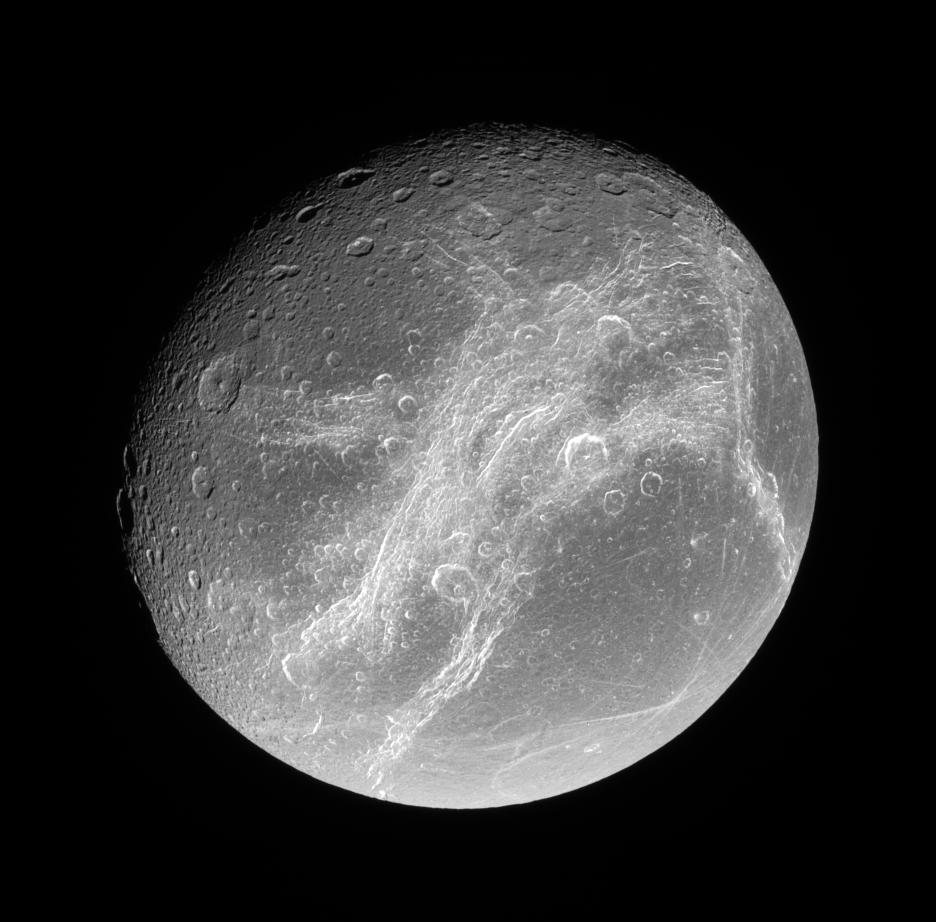
Dione

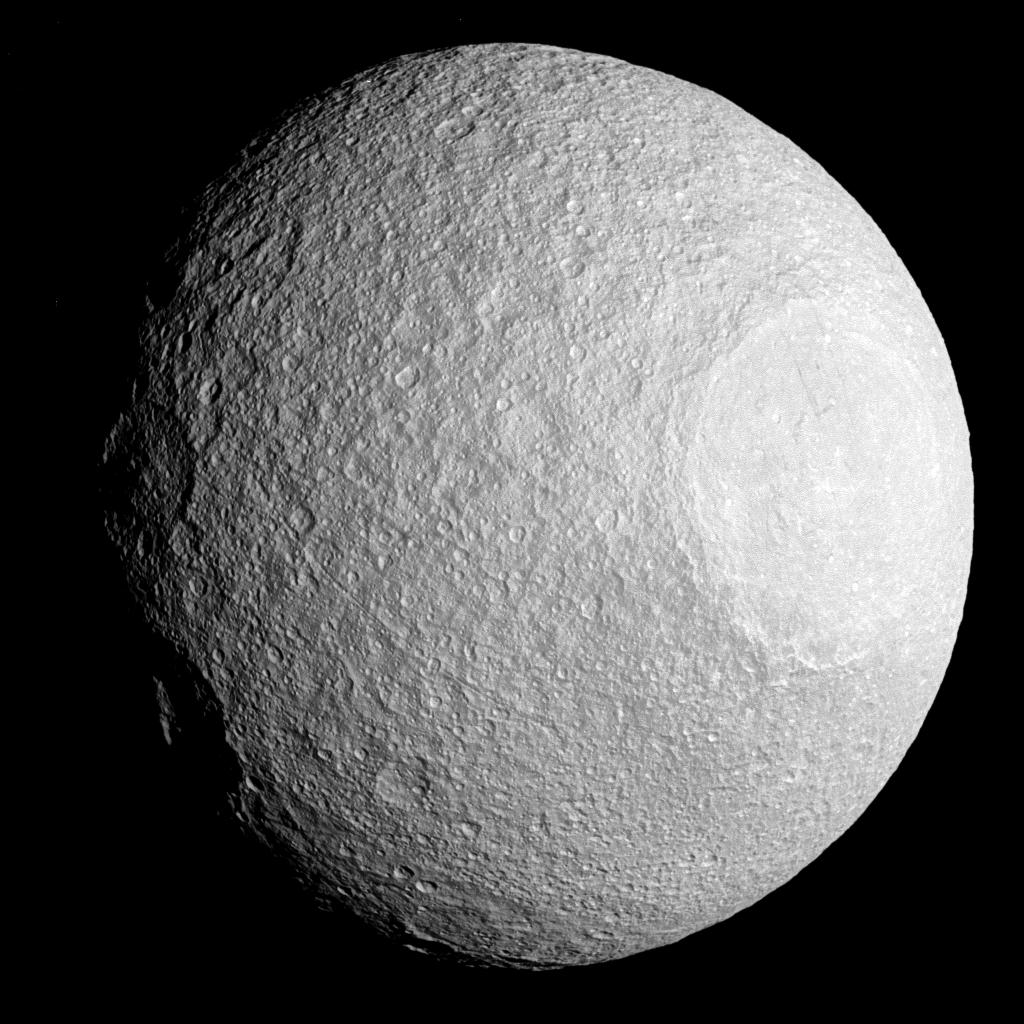
Tethys

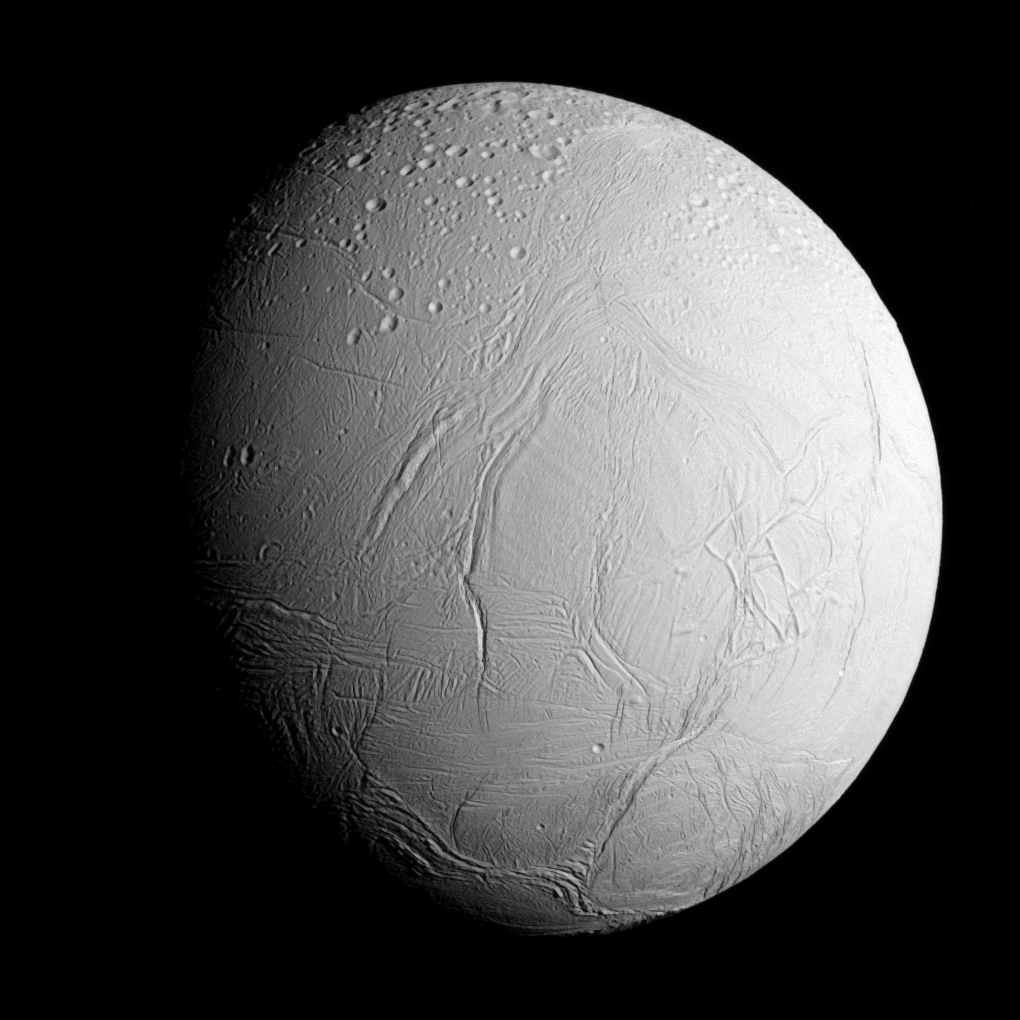
Enceladus

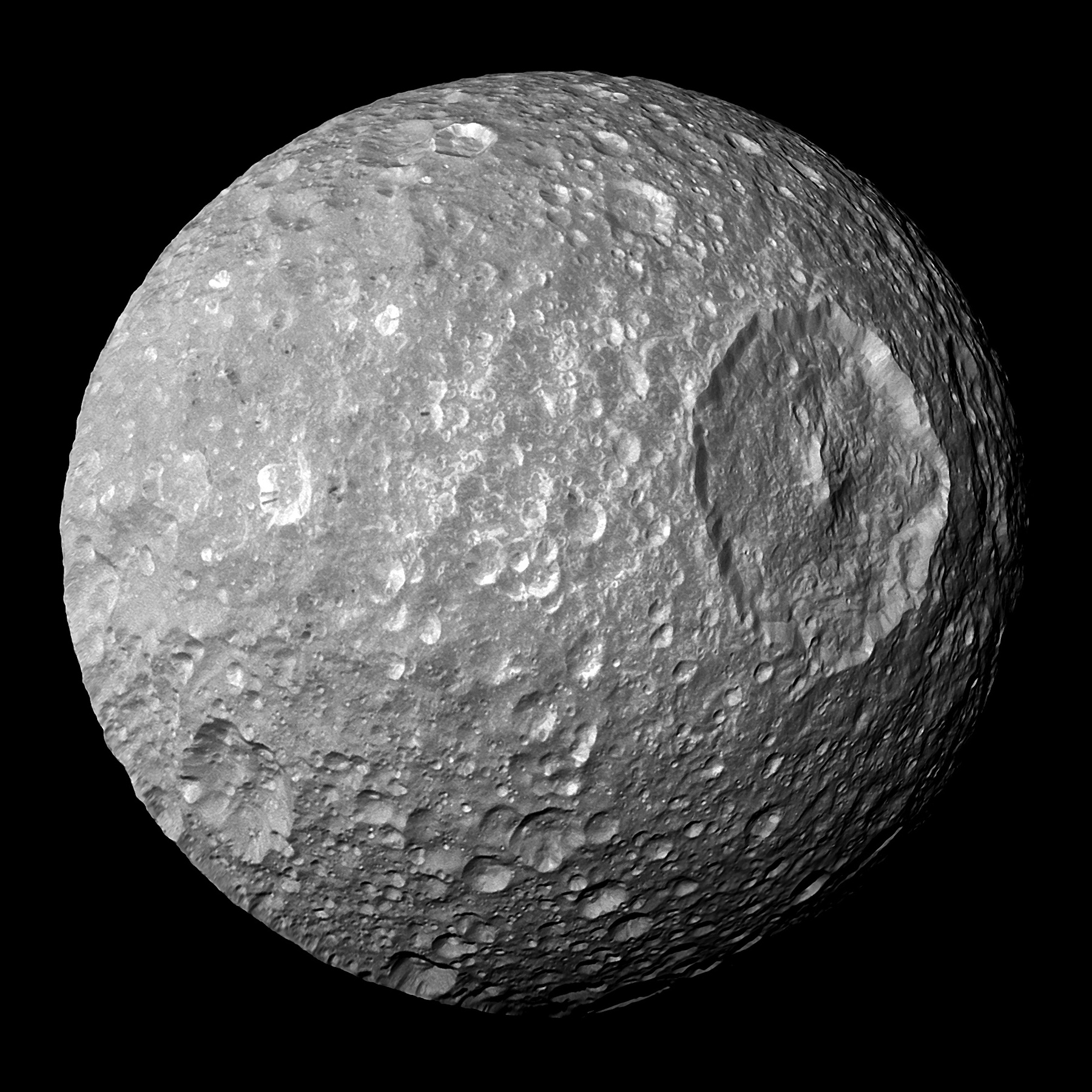
Mimas

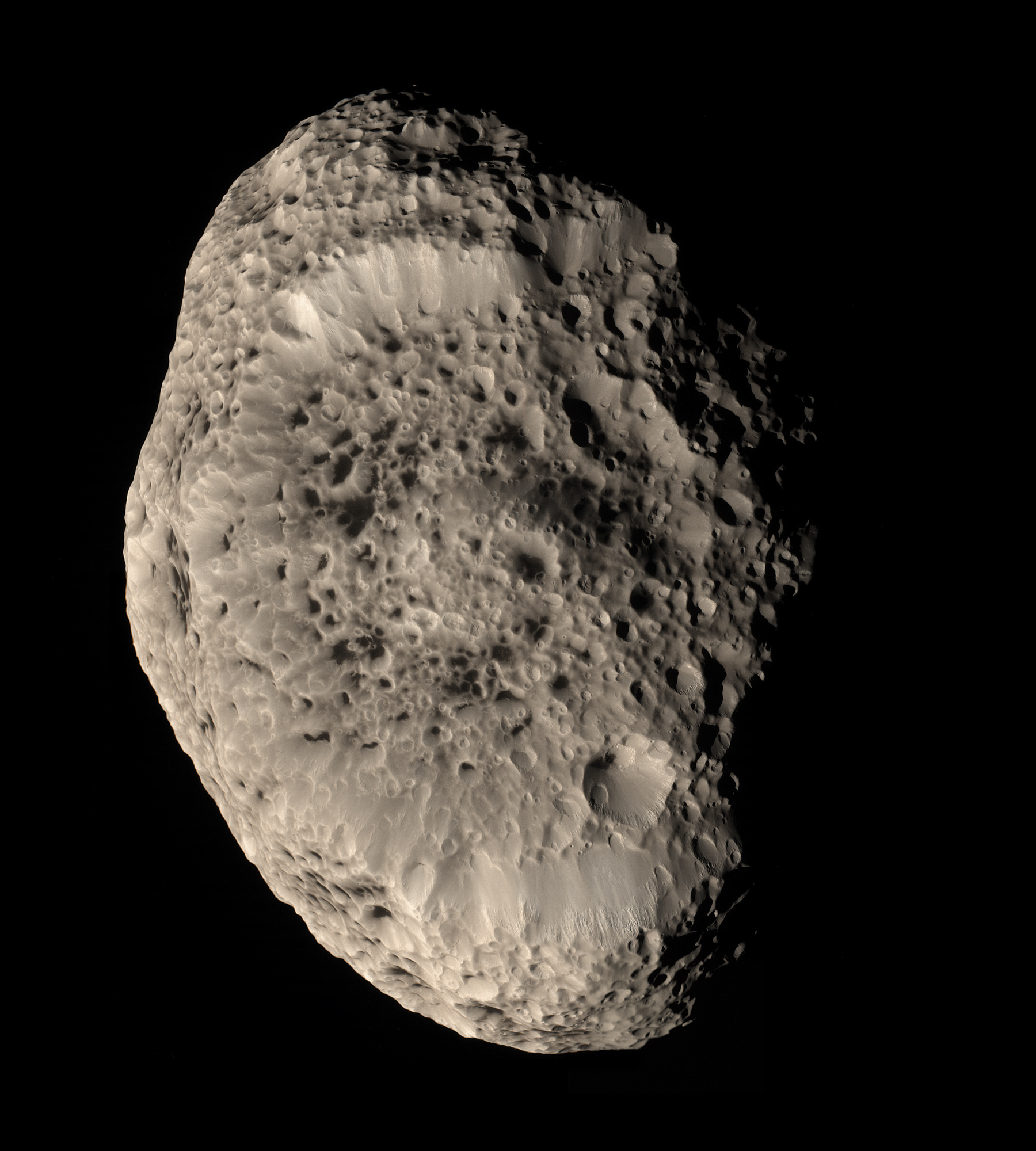
Hyperion

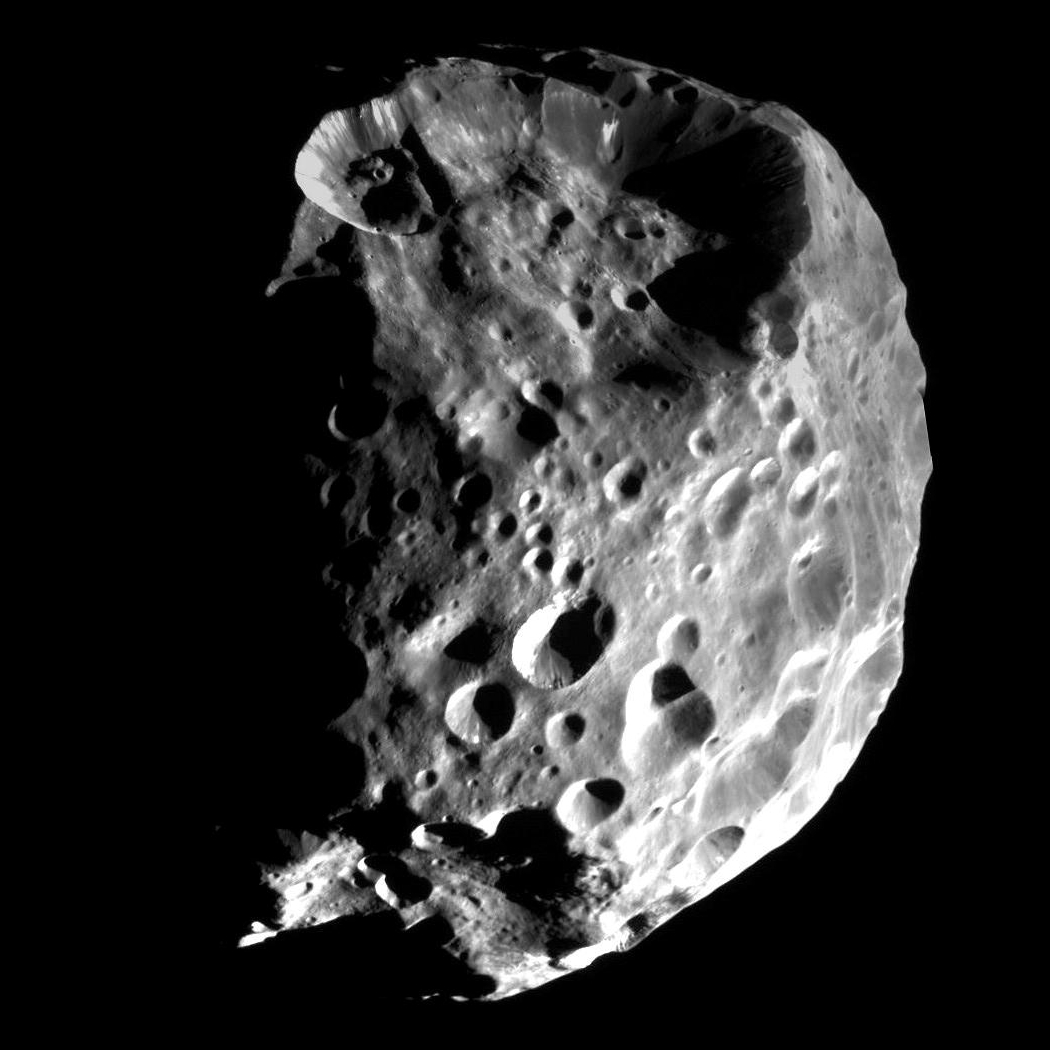
Phoebe

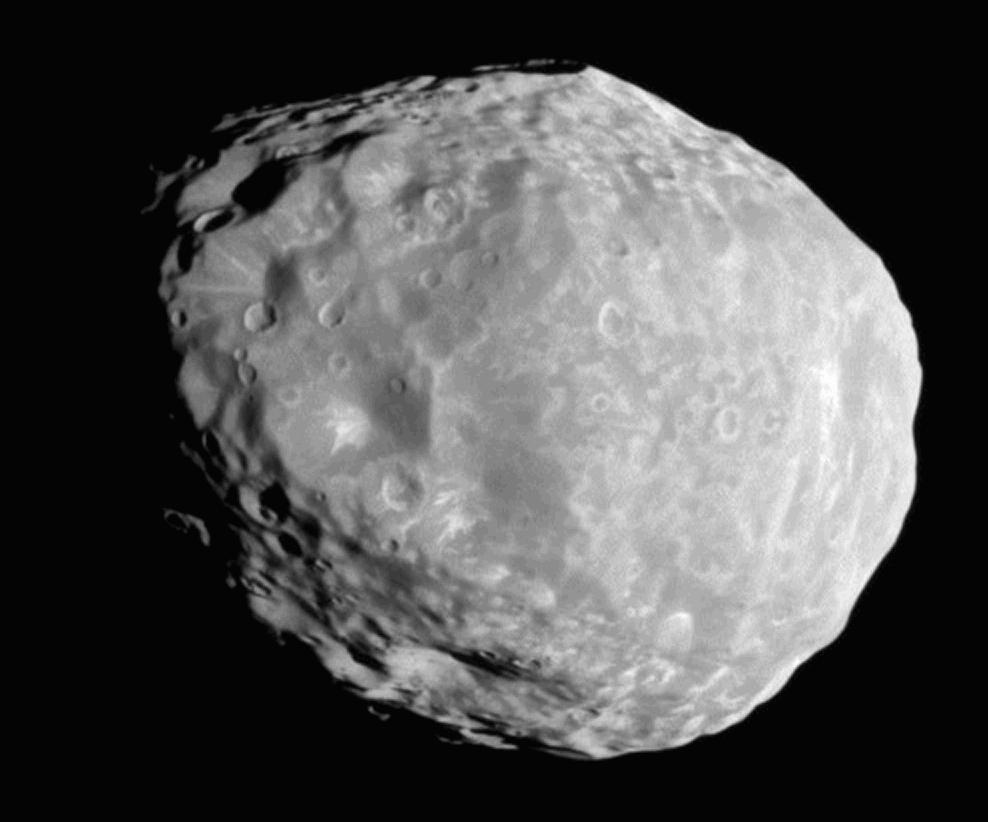
Janus

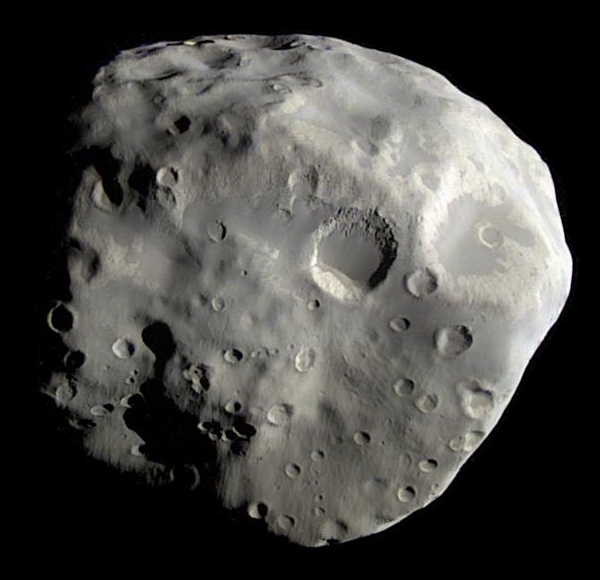
Epimetheus

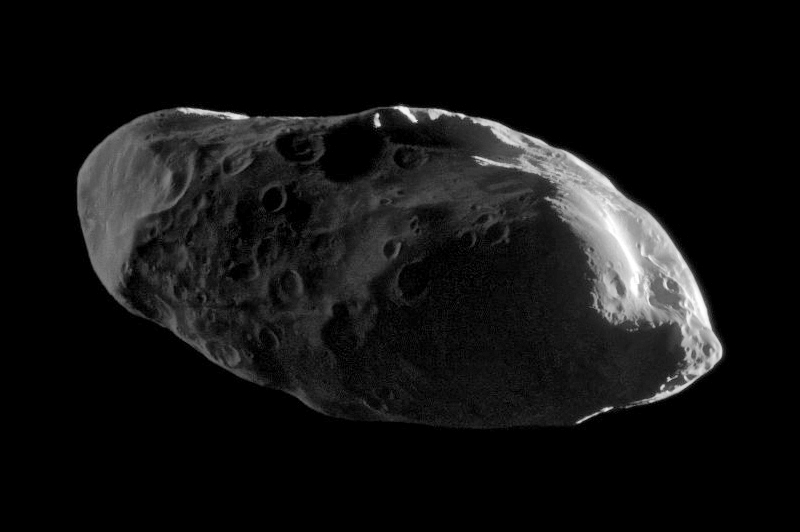
Prometheus

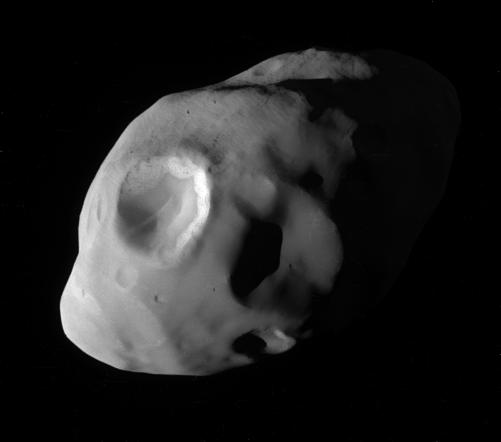
Pandora

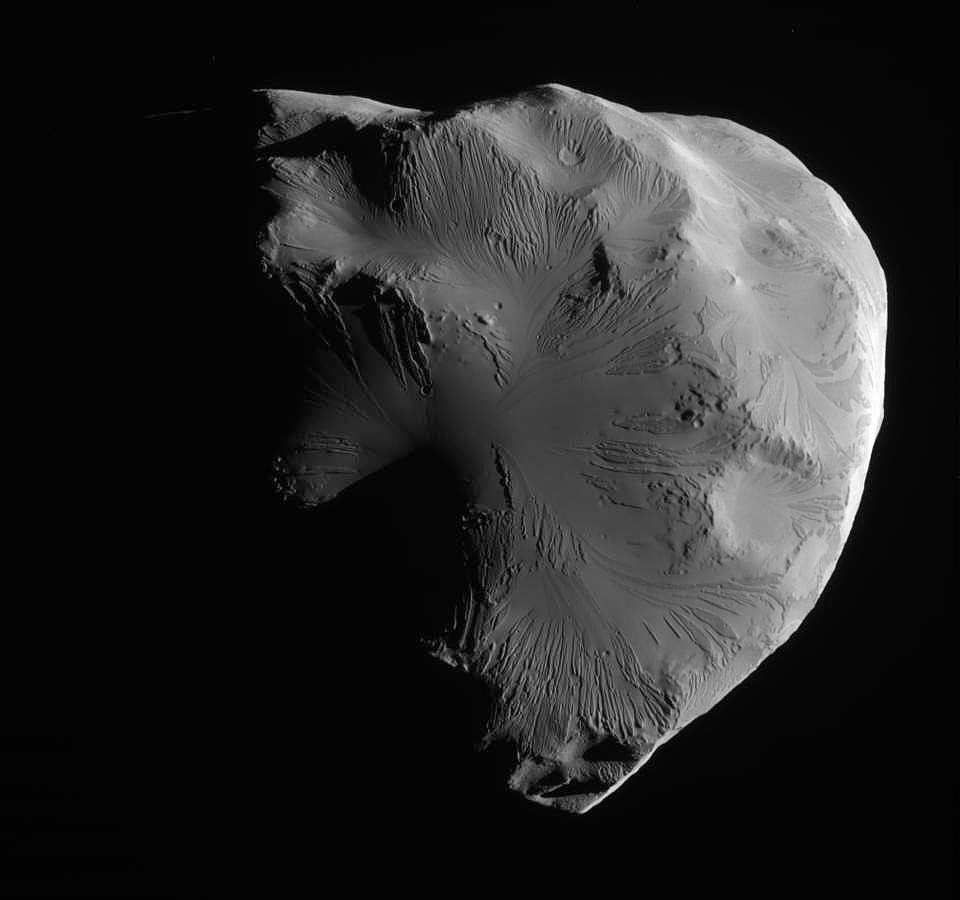
Helene

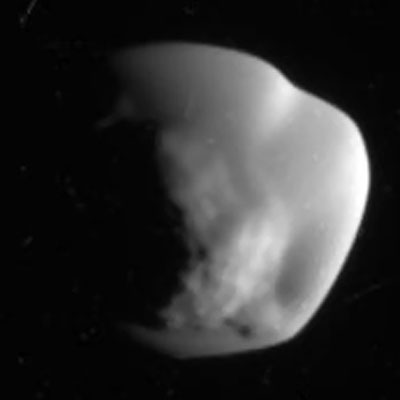
Atlas

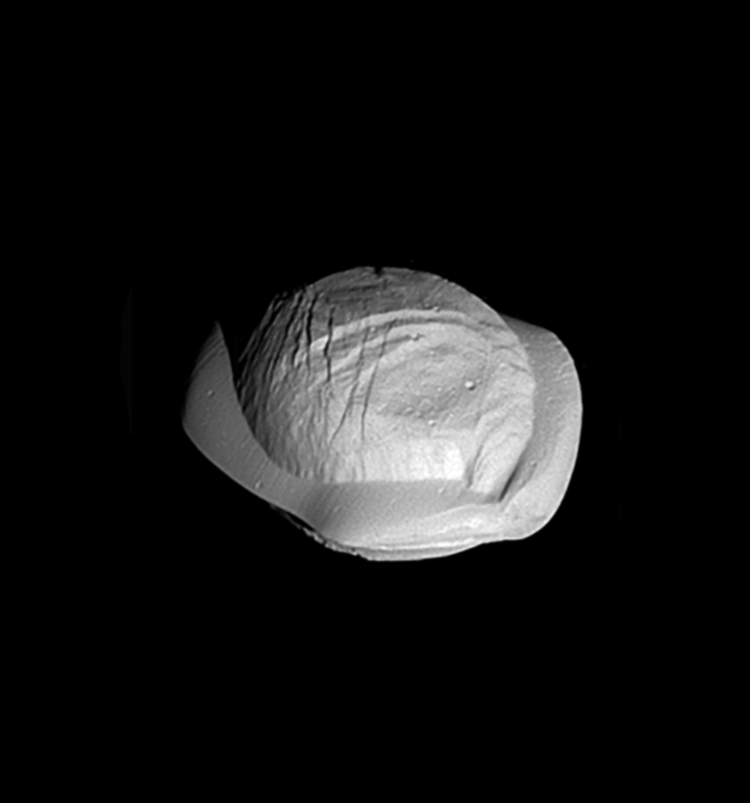
Pan

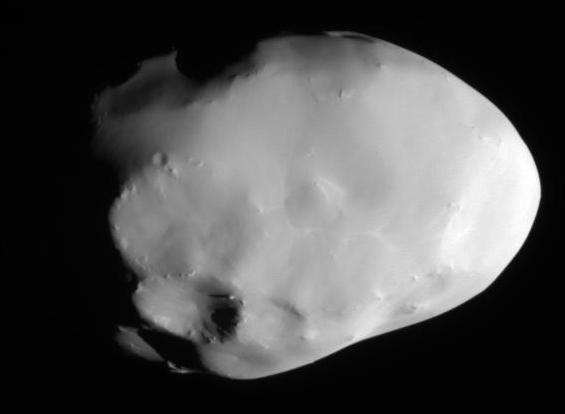
Telesto

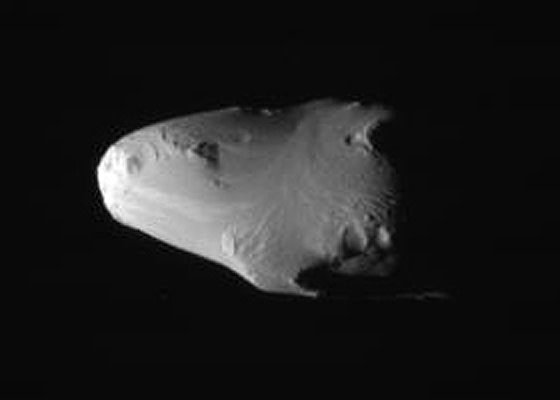
Calypso

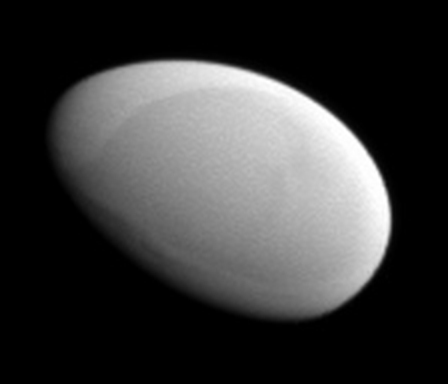
Methone

== History ==
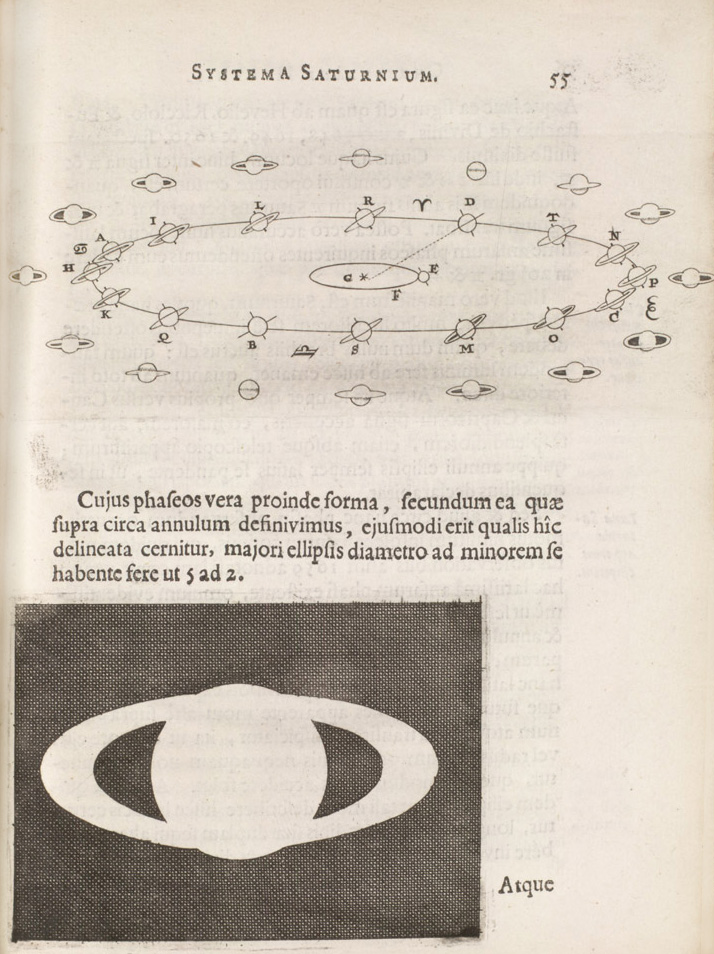
Huygens's explanation for the aspects of Saturn, Systema Saturnium (1659)

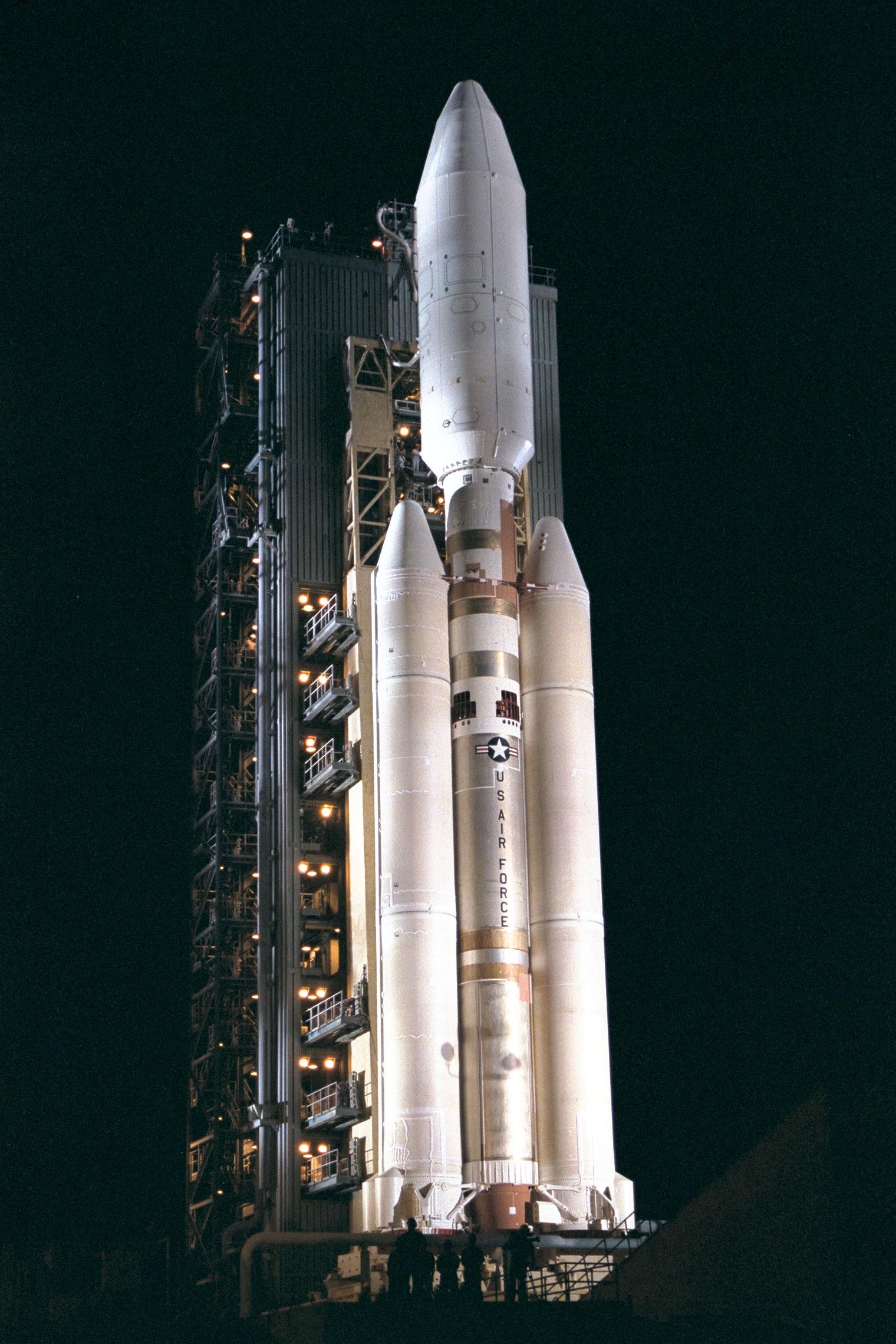
A Titan IV-B rocket and Centaur-T upper stage with the Cassini–Huygens payload at LC-40, three days before its 15 October 1997 launch

Cassini–Huygens's origins date to 1982, when the European Science Foundation and the American National Academy of Sciences formed a working group to investigate future cooperative missions. Two European scientists suggested a paired Saturn Orbiter and Titan Probe as a possible joint mission. In 1983, NASA's Solar System Exploration Committee recommended the same Orbiter and Probe pair as a core NASA project. NASA and the European Space Agency (ESA) performed a joint study of the potential mission from 1984 to 1985. ESA continued with its own study in 1986, while the American astronaut Sally Ride, in her influential 1987 report NASA Leadership and America's Future in Space, also examined and approved of the Cassini mission.

While Ride's report described the Saturn orbiter and probe as a NASA solo mission, in 1988 the Associate Administrator for Space Science and Applications of NASA, Len Fisk, returned to the idea of a joint NASA and ESA mission. He wrote to his counterpart at ESA, Roger Bonnet, strongly suggesting that ESA choose the Cassini mission from the three candidates at hand and promising that NASA would commit to the mission as soon as ESA did.

At the time, NASA was becoming more sensitive to the strain that had developed between the American and European space programs as a result of European perceptions that NASA had not treated it like an equal during previous collaborations. NASA officials and advisers involved in promoting and planning Cassini–Huygens attempted to correct this trend by stressing their desire to evenly share any scientific and technology benefits resulting from the mission. In part, this newfound spirit of cooperation with Europe was driven by a sense of competition with the Soviet Union, which had begun to cooperate more closely with Europe as ESA drew further away from NASA. Late in 1988, ESA chose Cassini–Huygens as its next major mission and the following year the program received major funding in the US.

The collaboration not only improved relations between the two space programs but also helped Cassini–Huygens survive congressional budget cuts in the United States. Cassini–Huygens came under fire politically in both 1992 and 1994, but NASA successfully persuaded the United States Congress that it would be unwise to halt the project after ESA had already poured funds into development because frustration on broken space exploration promises might spill over into other areas of foreign relations. The project proceeded politically smoothly after 1994, although citizens' groups concerned about the potential environmental impact a launch failure might have (because of its plutonium power source) attempted to derail it through protests and lawsuits until and past its 1997 launch.

== Spacecraft design ==
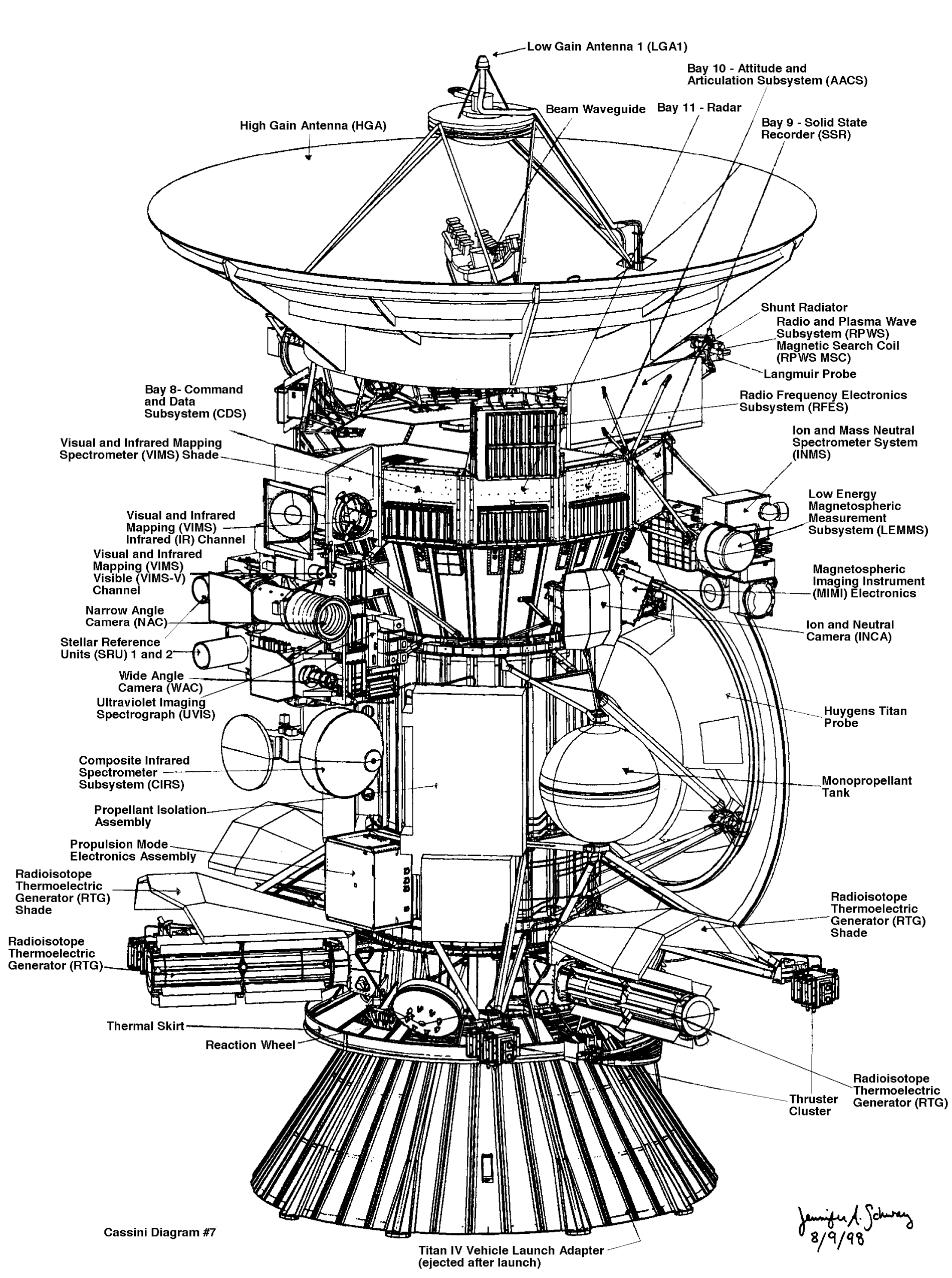
Diagram of Cassini

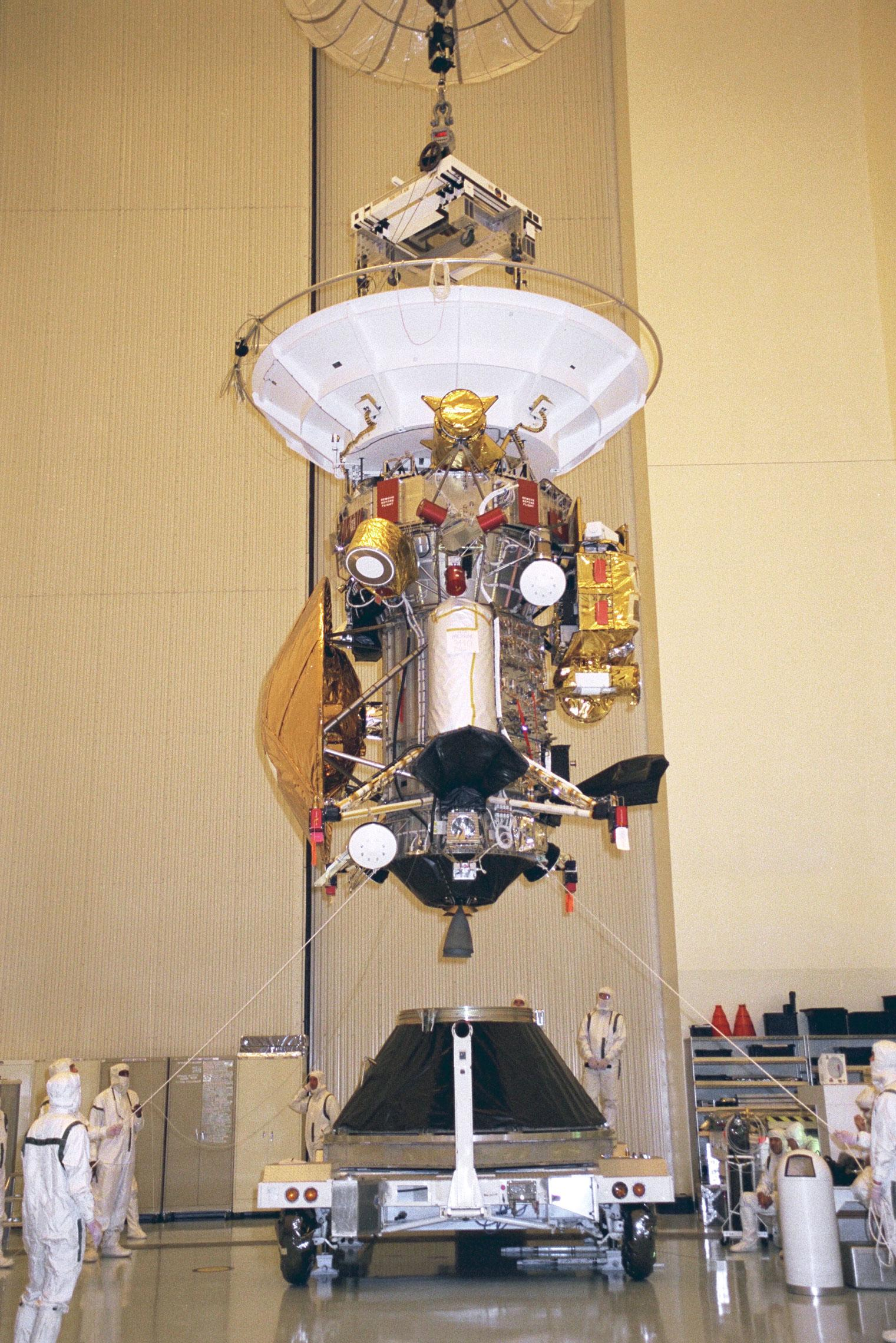
Cassini–Huygens assembly

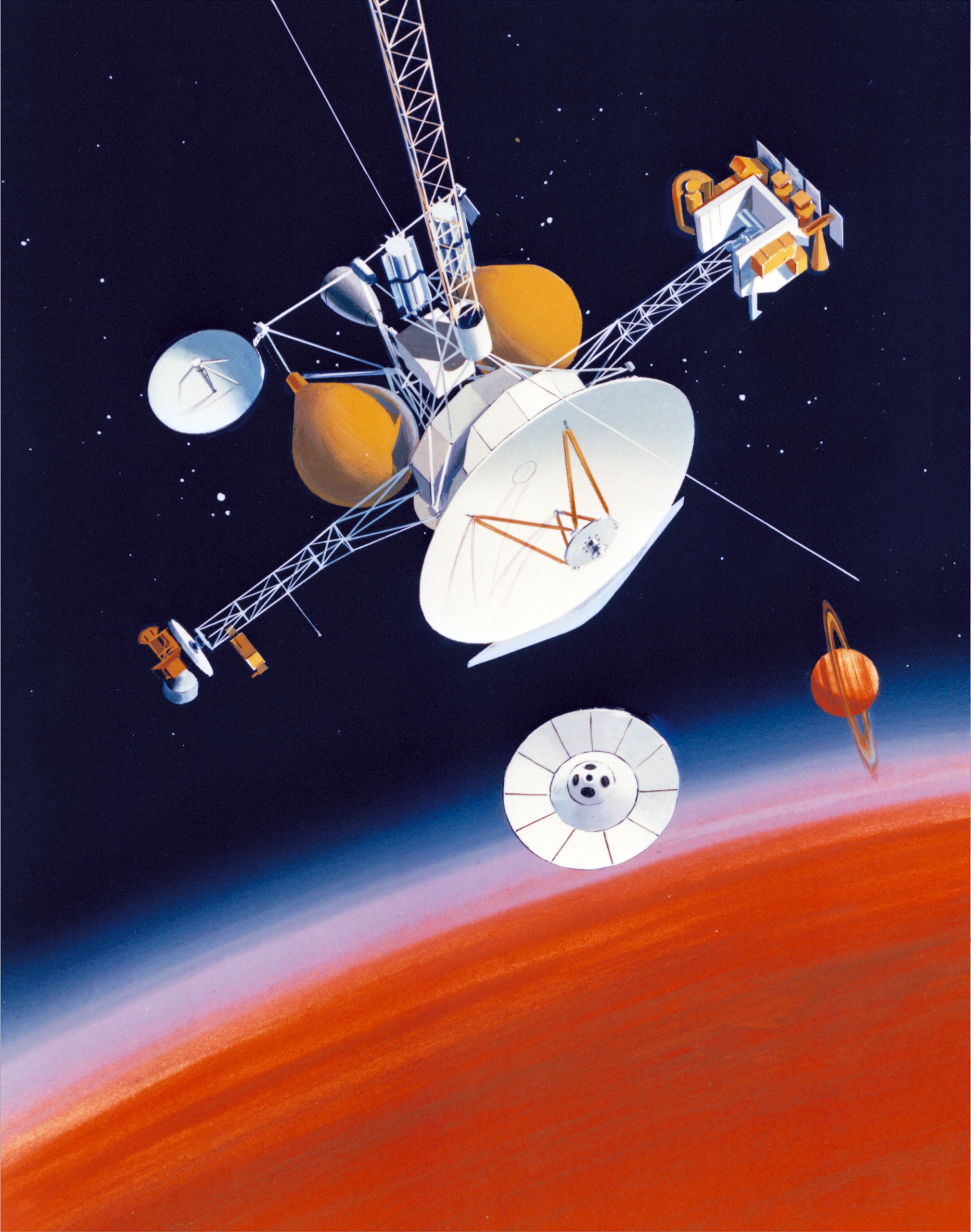
Cassini–Huygens original design (Mariner Mark II, 1988)

The spacecraft was planned to be the second three-axis stabilized, RTG-powered Mariner Mark II, a class of spacecraft developed for missions beyond the orbit of Mars, after the Comet Rendezvous Asteroid Flyby (CRAF) mission, but budget cuts and project rescopings forced NASA to terminate CRAF development to save Cassini. As a result, Cassini became more specialized. The Mariner Mark II series was cancelled.

The combined orbiter and probe was at the time the third-largest uncrewed interplanetary spacecraft ever successfully launched, behind the Phobos 1 and 2 Mars probes, as well as being among the most complex; NASA's Europa Clipper became the new third-largest probe upon its launch in 2024. The orbiter had a mass of 2,150 kg (4,740 lb), the probe 350 kg (770 lb) including 30 kg (66 lb) of probe support equipment left on the orbiter. With the launch vehicle adapter and 3,132 kg (6,905 lb) of propellants at launch, the spacecraft had a mass of 5,600 kg (12,300 lb).

The Cassini spacecraft was 6.8 meters (22 ft) high and 4 meters (13 ft) wide. Its bus was a dodecagonal prism atop a conical frustum connecting it to a cylinder containing the propellant tanks, to which the RTGs and Huygens were attached. Spacecraft complexity was increased by its trajectory (flight path) to Saturn, and by the ambitious science at its destination. Cassini had 1,630 interconnected electronic components, 22,000 wire connections, and 14 kilometers (8.7 mi) of cabling. The core control computer CPU was a redundant system using the MIL-STD-1750A instruction set architecture. The main propulsion system consisted of one prime and one backup R-4D bipropellant rocket engine. The thrust of each engine was 490 N (110 lbf) and the total spacecraft delta-v was 2,352 m/s (5,260 mph). Smaller monopropellant rockets provided attitude control.

Cassini was powered by 32.7 kg (72 lb) of nuclear fuel, mainly plutonium dioxide (containing 28.3 kg (62 lb) of pure plutonium). The heat from the material's radioactive decay was turned into electricity. Huygens was supported by Cassini during cruise, but used chemical batteries when independent.

The probe contained a DVD with more than 616,400 signatures from citizens in 81 countries, collected in a public campaign.

Until September 2017 the Cassini probe continued orbiting Saturn at a distance of between 8.2 and 10.2 astronomical units (1.23×10^{9} and 1.53×10^{9} km; 760,000,000 and 950,000,000 mi) from the Earth. It took 68 to 84 minutes for radio signals to travel from Earth to the spacecraft, and vice versa. Thus ground controllers could not give "real-time" instructions for daily operations or for unexpected events. Even if response were immediate, more than two hours would have passed between the occurrence of a problem and the reception of the engineers' response by the satellite.

== Instruments ==
Titan's surface revealed by VIMS

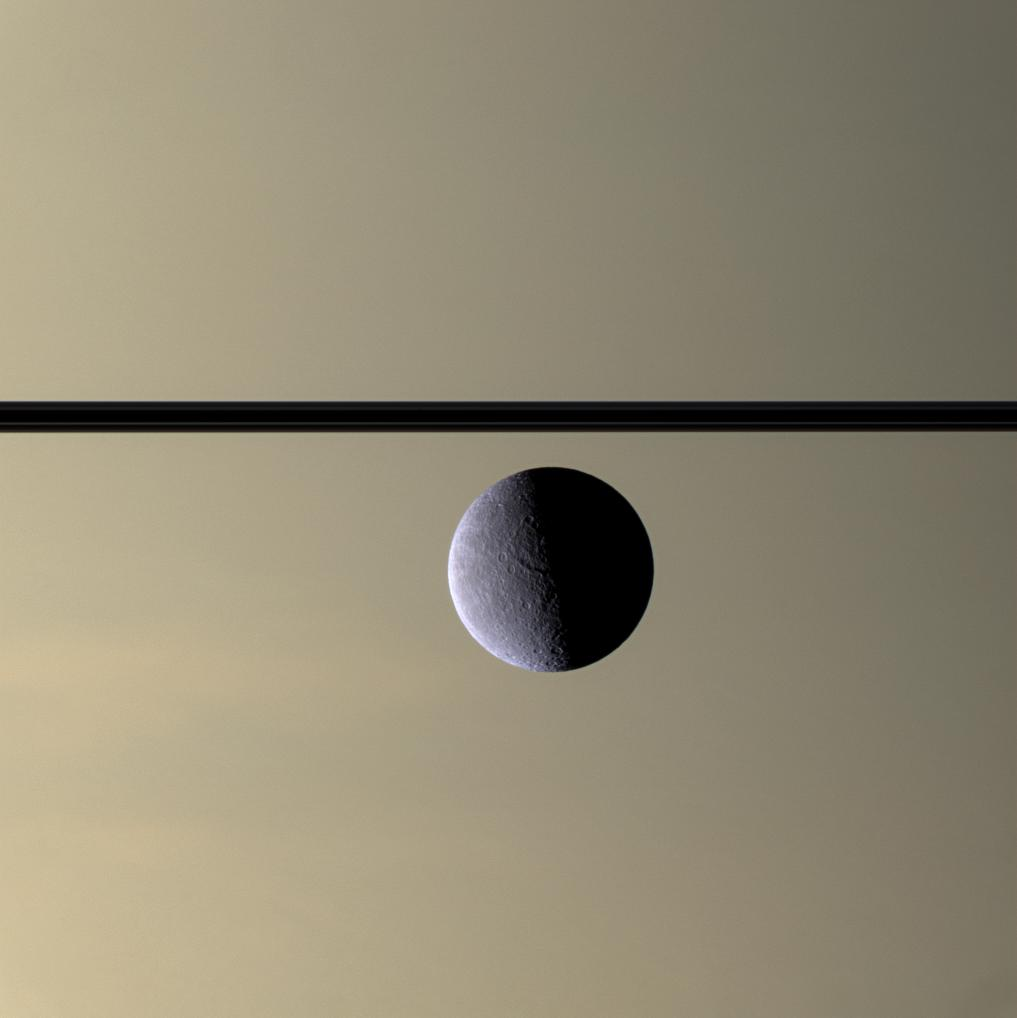
Rhea in front of Saturn

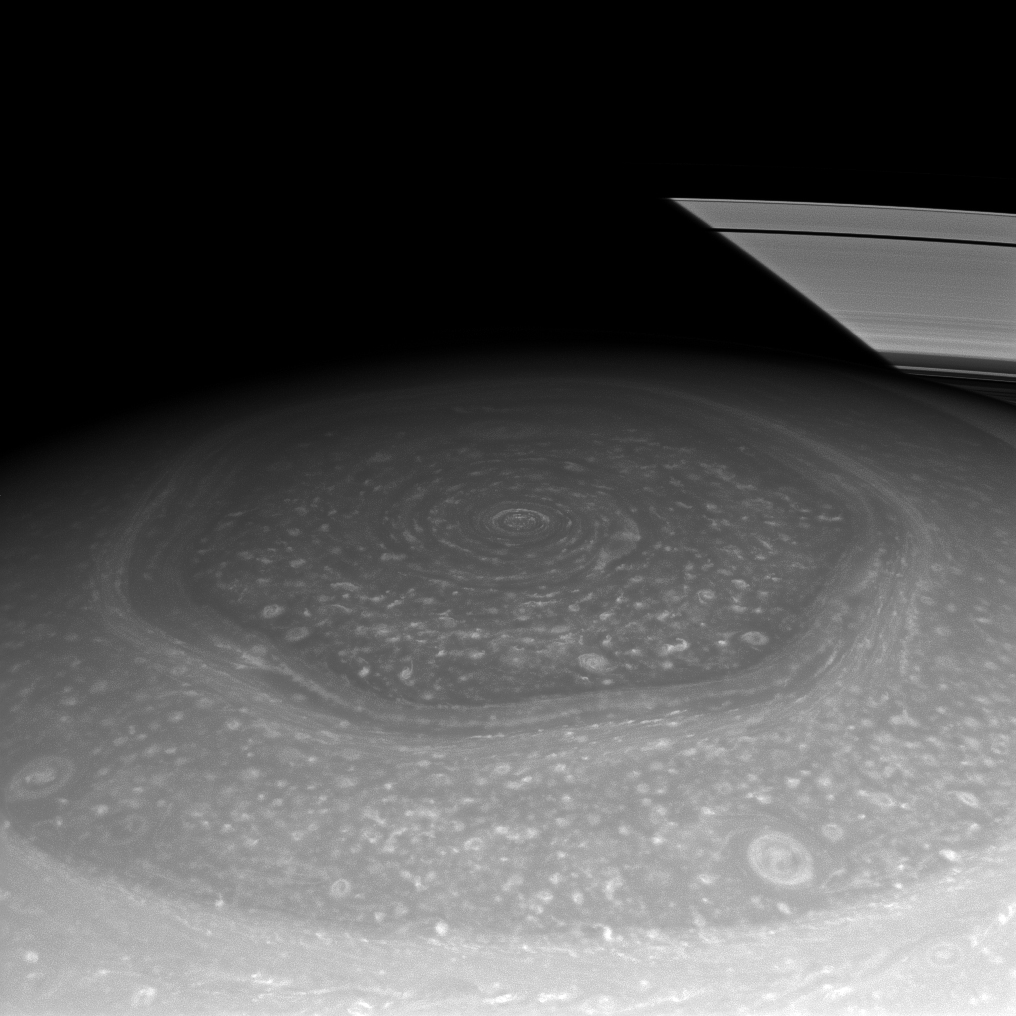
Saturn's north polar hexagon

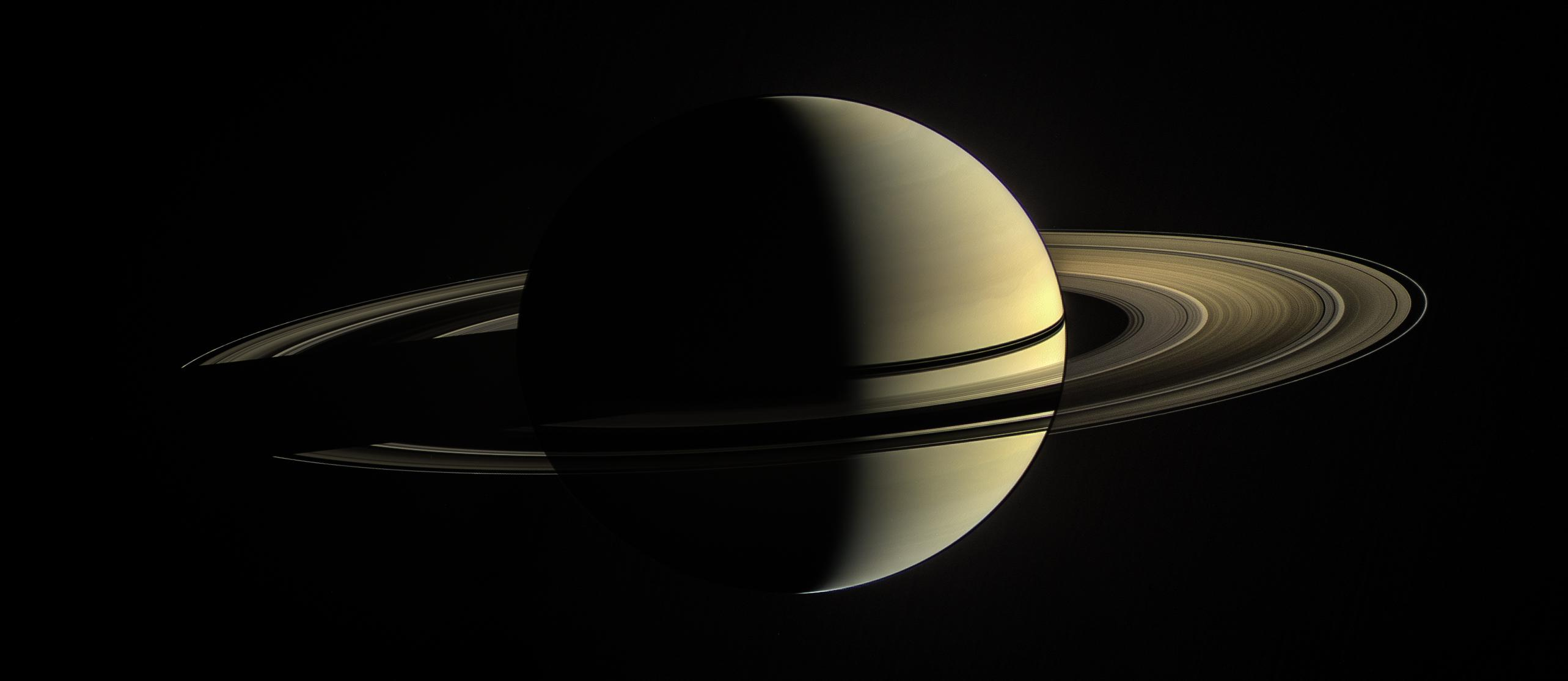
Saturn in natural-color (January 2010)

Animated 3D model of the spacecraft

=== Summary ===
Instruments:

- Optical Remote Sensing ("Located on the remote sensing pallet")
  - Composite Infrared Spectrometer (CIRS)
  - Imaging Science Subsystem (ISS)
  - Ultraviolet Imaging Spectrograph (UVIS)
  - Visual and Infrared Mapping Spectrometer (VIMS)
- Fields, Particles and Waves (mostly in situ)
  - Cassini Plasma Spectrometer (CAPS)
  - Cosmic Dust Analyzer (CDA)
  - Ion and Neutral Mass Spectrometer (INMS)
  - Magnetometer (MAG)
  - Magnetospheric Imaging Instrument (MIMI)
  - Radio and Plasma Wave Science (RPWS)
- Microwave Remote Sensing
  - Radar
  - Radio Science (RSS)

=== Description ===
Cassini's instrumentation consisted of: a synthetic aperture radar mapper, a charge-coupled device imaging system, a visible/infrared mapping spectrometer, a composite infrared spectrometer, a cosmic dust analyzer, a radio and plasma wave experiment, a plasma spectrometer, an ultraviolet imaging spectrograph, a magnetospheric imaging instrument, a magnetometer and an ion/neutral mass spectrometer. Telemetry from the communications antenna and other special transmitters (an S-band transmitter and a dual-frequency K_{a}-band system) was also used to make observations of the atmospheres of Titan and Saturn and to measure the gravity fields of the planet and its satellites.

Cassini Plasma Spectrometer (CAPS)
CAPS was an in situ instrument that measured the flux of charged particles at the location of the spacecraft, as a function of direction and energy. The ion composition was also measured using a time-of-flight mass spectrometer. CAPS measured particles produced by ionisation of molecules originating from Saturn's and Titan's ionosphere, as well as the plumes of Enceladus. CAPS also investigated plasma in these areas, along with the solar wind and its interaction with Saturn's magnetosphere. CAPS was turned off in June 2011, as a precaution due to a "soft" electrical short circuit that occurred in the instrument. It was powered on again in March 2012, but after 78 days another short circuit forced the instrument to be shut down permanently.
Cosmic Dust Analyzer (CDA)
The CDA was an in situ instrument that measured the size, speed, and direction of tiny dust grains near Saturn. It could also measure the grains' chemical elements. Some of these particles orbited Saturn, while others came from other star systems. The CDA on the orbiter was designed to learn more about these particles, the materials in other celestial bodies and potentially about the origins of the universe.
Composite Infrared Spectrometer (CIRS)
The CIRS was a remote sensing instrument that measured the infrared radiation coming from objects to learn about their temperatures, thermal properties, and compositions. Throughout the Cassini–Huygens mission, the CIRS measured infrared emissions from atmospheres, rings and surfaces in the vast Saturn system. It mapped the atmosphere of Saturn in three dimensions to determine temperature and pressure profiles with altitude, gas composition, and the distribution of aerosols and clouds. It also measured thermal characteristics and the composition of satellite surfaces and rings.
Ion and Neutral Mass Spectrometer (INMS)
The INMS was an in situ instrument that measured the composition of charged particles (protons and heavier ions) and neutral particles (atoms and molecules) near Titan and Saturn to learn more about their atmospheres. The instrument used a quadrupole mass spectrometer. INMS was also intended to measure the positive ion and neutral environments of Saturn's icy satellites and rings.
Imaging Science Subsystem (ISS)
The ISS was a remote sensing instrument that captured most images in visible light, and also some infrared images and ultraviolet images. The ISS took hundreds of thousands of images of Saturn, its rings, and its moons. The ISS had both a wide-angle camera (WAC) and a narrow-angle camera (NAC). Each of these cameras used a sensitive charge-coupled device (CCD) as its electromagnetic wave detector. Each CCD had a 1,024x1,024 square array of pixels, each pixel 12 μm square. Both cameras allowed for many data collection modes, including on-chip data compression, and were fitted with spectral filters that rotated on a wheel to view different bands within the electromagnetic spectrum ranging from 0.2 to 1.1 μm.
Dual Technique Magnetometer (MAG)
The MAG was an in situ instrument that measured the strength and direction of the magnetic field around Saturn. The magnetic fields are generated partly by the molten core at Saturn's center. Measuring the magnetic field is one of the ways to probe the core. MAG aimed to develop a three-dimensional model of Saturn's magnetosphere, and determine the magnetic state of Titan and its atmosphere, and the icy satellites and their role in the magnetosphere of Saturn.
Magnetospheric Imaging Instrument (MIMI)
The MIMI was both an in situ and remote sensing instrument that produces images and other data about the particles trapped in Saturn's huge magnetic field, or magnetosphere. The in situ component measured energetic ions and electrons while the remote sensing component (the Ion And Neutral Camera, INCA) was an energetic neutral atom imager. This information was used to study the overall configuration and dynamics of the magnetosphere and its interactions with the solar wind, Saturn's atmosphere, Titan, rings, and icy satellites.
Radar
The on-board radar was an active and passive sensing instrument that produced maps of Titan's surface. Radar waves were powerful enough to penetrate the thick veil of haze surrounding Titan. By measuring the send and return time of the signals it is possible to determine the height of large surface features, such as mountains and canyons. The passive radar listened for radio waves that Saturn or its moons may emit.
Radio and Plasma Wave Science instrument (RPWS)
The RPWS was an in situ instrument and remote sensing instrument that receives and measures radio signals coming from Saturn, including the radio waves given off by the interaction of the solar wind with Saturn and Titan. RPWS measured the electric and magnetic wave fields in the interplanetary medium and planetary magnetospheres. It also determined the electron density and temperature near Titan and in some regions of Saturn's magnetosphere using either plasma waves at characteristic frequencies (e.g., the upper hybrid line) or a Langmuir probe. RPWS studied the configuration of Saturn's magnetic field and its relationship to Saturn Kilometric Radiation (SKR), as well as monitoring and mapping Saturn's ionosphere, plasma, and lightning from Saturn's (and possibly Titan's) atmosphere.
Radio Science Subsystem (RSS)
The RSS was a remote-sensing instrument that used radio antennas on Earth to observe the way radio signals from the spacecraft changed as they were sent through objects, such as Titan's atmosphere or Saturn's rings, or even behind the Sun. The RSS also studied the compositions, pressures and temperatures of atmospheres and ionospheres, radial structure and particle size distribution within rings, body and system masses and the gravitational field. The instrument used the spacecraft X-band communication link as well as S-band downlink and K_{a}-band uplink and downlink.

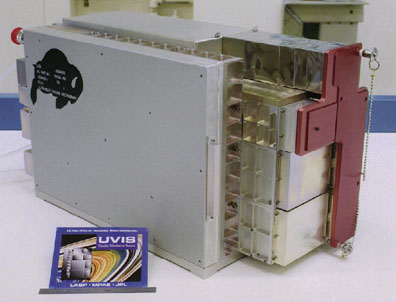
Cassini UVIS instrument built by the Laboratory for Atmospheric and Space Physics at the University of Colorado.

Ultraviolet Imaging Spectrograph (UVIS)
The UVIS was a remote-sensing instrument that captured images of the ultraviolet light reflected off an object, such as the clouds of Saturn and/or its rings, to learn more about their structure and composition. Designed to measure ultraviolet light over wavelengths from 55.8 to 190 nm, this instrument was also a tool to help determine the composition, distribution, aerosol particle content and temperatures of their atmospheres. Unlike other types of spectrometer, this sensitive instrument could take both spectral and spatial readings. It was particularly adept at determining the composition of gases. Spatial observations took a wide-by-narrow view, only one pixel tall and 64 pixels across. The spectral dimension was 1,024 pixels per spatial pixel. It could also take many images that create movies of the ways in which this material is moved around by other forces.
UVIS consisted of four separate detector channels, the Far Ultraviolet (FUV), Extreme Ultraviolet (EUV), High Speed Photometer (HSP) and the Hydrogen-Deuterium Absorption Cell (HDAC). UVIS collected hyperspectral imagery and discrete spectra of Saturn, its moons and its rings, as well as stellar occultation data.

The HSP channel is designed to observe starlight that passes through Saturn's rings (known as stellar occultations) in order to understand the structure and optical depth of the rings. Stellar occultation data from both the HSP and FUV channels confirmed the existence of water vapor plumes at the south pole of Enceladus, as well as characterized the composition of the plumes.

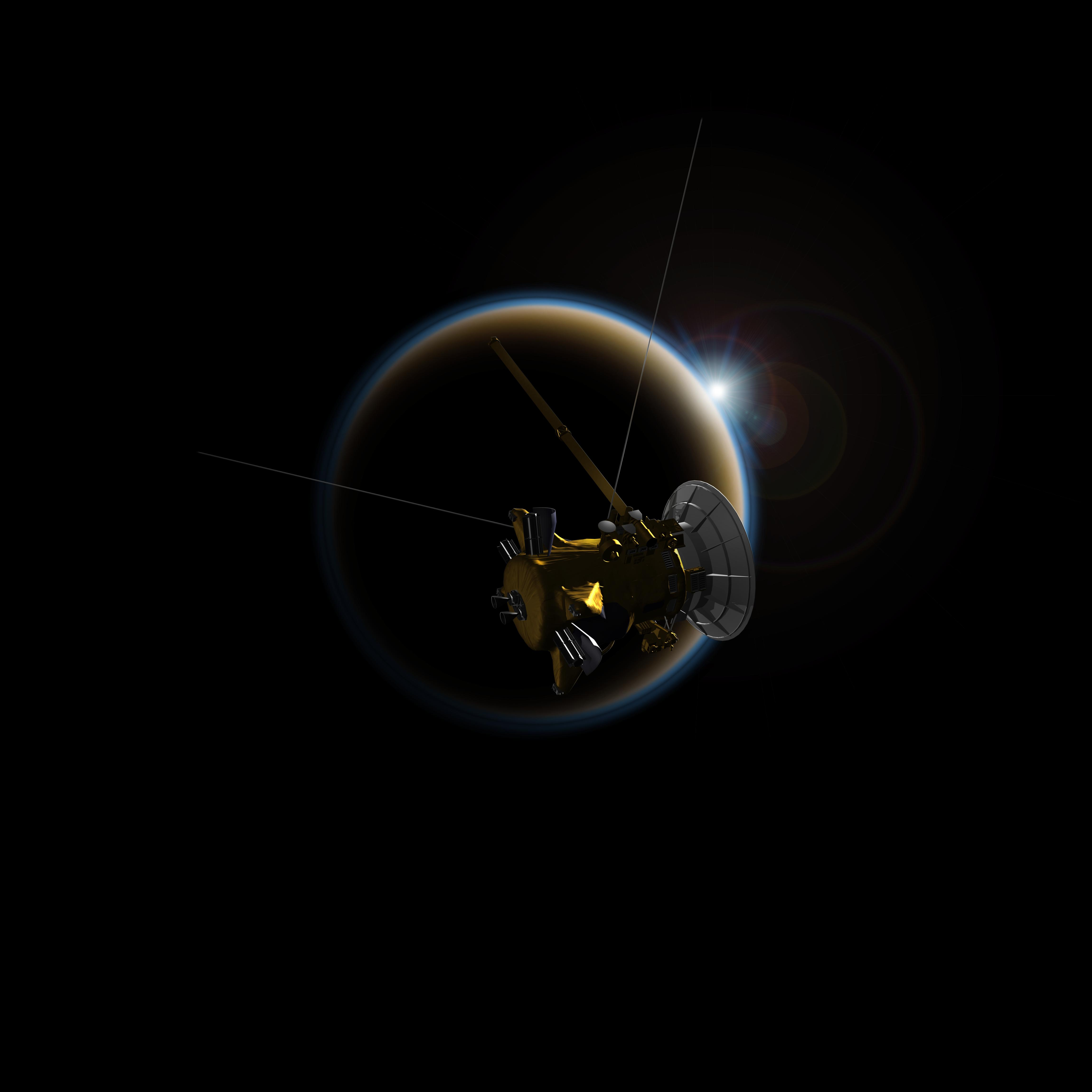
VIMS spectra taken while looking through Titan's atmosphere towards the Sun helped understand the atmospheres of exoplanets (artist's concept; May 27, 2014).

Visible and Infrared Mapping Spectrometer (VIMS)
The VIMS was a remote sensing instrument that captured images using visible and infrared light to learn more about the composition of moon surfaces, the rings, and the atmospheres of Saturn and Titan. It consisted of two cameras - one used to measure visible light, the other infrared. VIMS measured reflected and emitted radiation from atmospheres, rings and surfaces over wavelengths from 350 to 5100 nm, to help determine their compositions, temperatures and structures. It also observed the sunlight and starlight that passes through the rings to learn more about their structure. Scientists used VIMS for long-term studies of cloud movement and morphology in the Saturn system, to determine Saturn's weather patterns.

== Plutonium power source ==
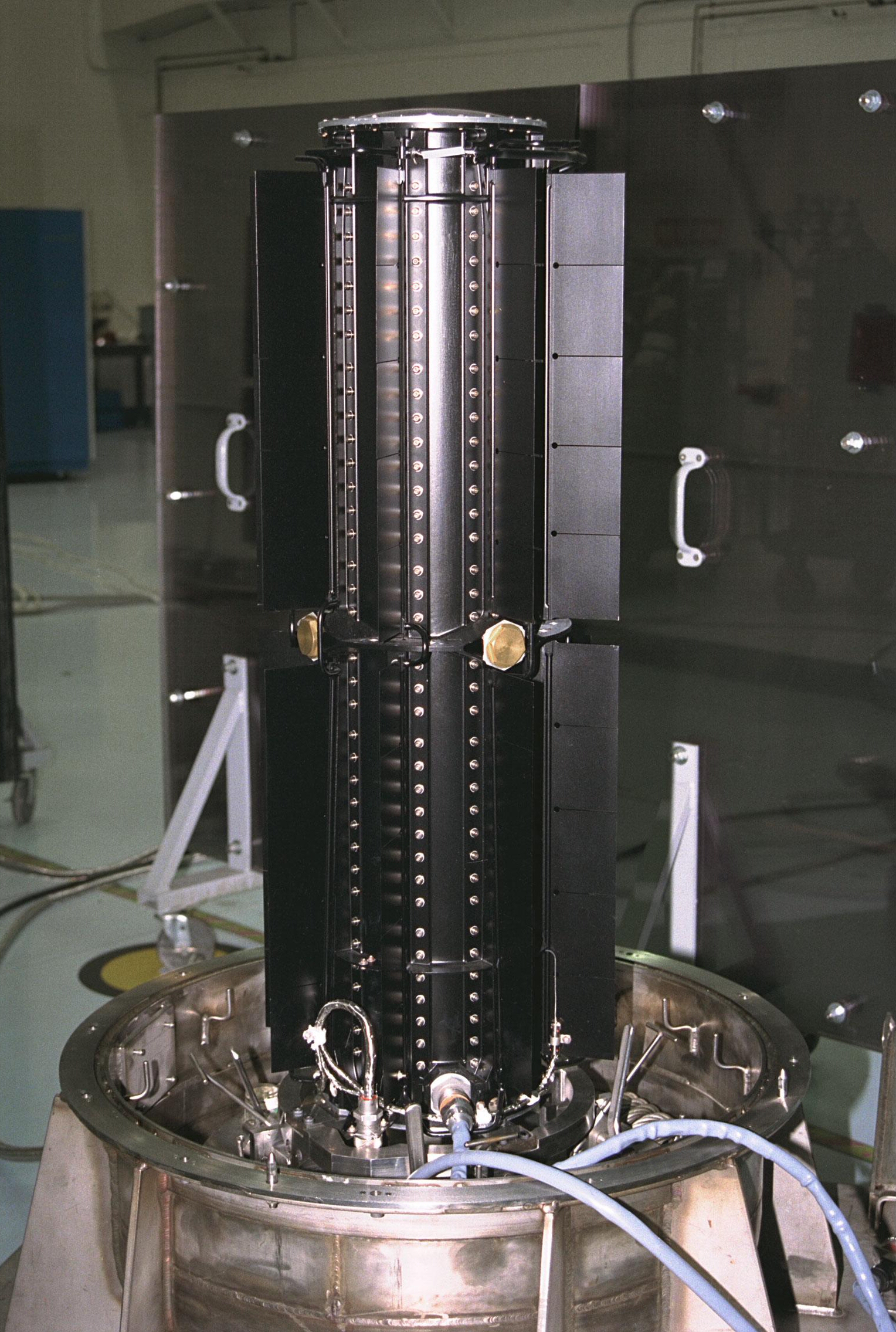
A Cassini GPHS-RTG before installation

Because of Saturn's distance from the Sun, solar arrays were not feasible as power sources for this space probe. To generate enough power, such arrays would have been too large and too heavy. Instead, the Cassini orbiter was powered by three GPHS-RTG radioisotope thermoelectric generators, which use heat from the decay of about 33 kg (73 lb) of plutonium-238 (in the form of plutonium dioxide) to generate direct current electricity via thermoelectrics. The RTGs on the Cassini mission have the same design as those used on the New Horizons, Galileo, and Ulysses space probes, and they were designed to have very long operational lifetimes. At the end of the nominal 11-year Cassini mission, they were still able to produce 600 to 700 watts of electrical power. (Leftover hardware from the Cassini RTG Program was modified and used to power the New Horizons mission to Pluto and the Kuiper belt, which was designed and launched later.)

Electric power distribution was accomplished by 192 solid-state power switches, which also functioned as circuit breakers in the event of an overload condition. The switches used MOSFETs that featured better efficiency and a longer lifetime as compared to conventional switches, while at the same time eliminating transients. However, these solid-state circuit breakers were prone to erroneous tripping (presumably from cosmic rays), requiring them to reset and causing losses in experimental data.

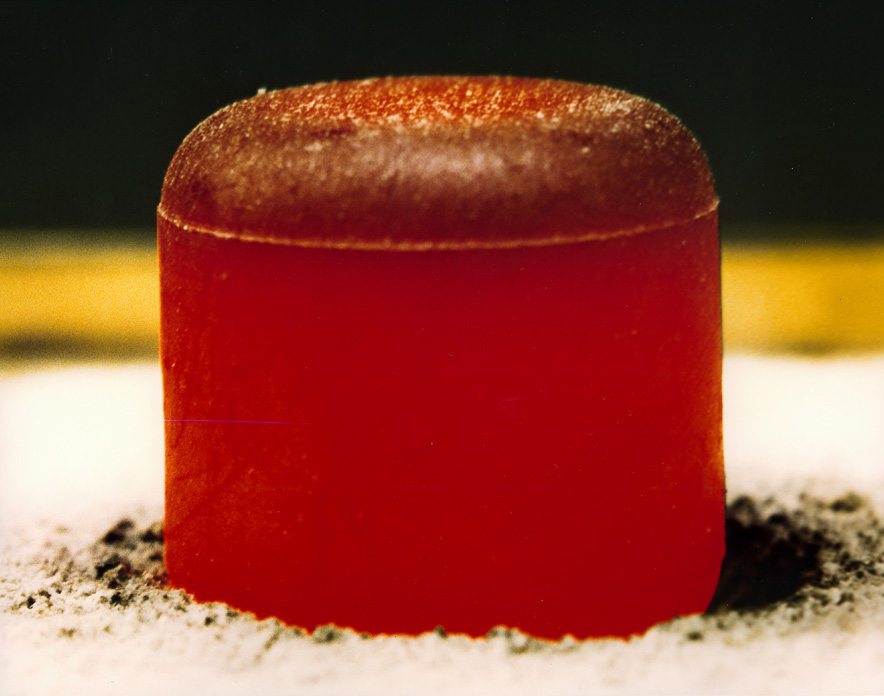
A glowing-hot plutonium pellet was the power source for the probe's radioisotope thermoelectric generator

To gain momentum while already in flight, the trajectory of the Cassini mission included several gravitational slingshot maneuvers: two fly-by passes of Venus, one more of the Earth, and then one of the planet Jupiter. The terrestrial flyby was the final instance when the probe posed any conceivable danger to human beings. The maneuver was successful, with Cassini passing by 1,171 km (728 mi) above the Earth on August 18, 1999. Had there been any malfunction causing the probe to collide with the Earth, NASA's complete environmental impact study estimated that, in the worst case (with an acute angle of entry in which Cassini would gradually burn up), a significant fraction of the 33 kg of nuclear fuel inside the RTGs would have been dispersed into the Earth's atmosphere so that up to five billion people (i.e., almost the entire terrestrial population) could have been exposed, causing up to an estimated 5,000 additional cancer deaths over the subsequent decades (0.0005 per cent, i.e. a fraction 0.000005, of a billion cancer deaths expected anyway from other causes; the product is incorrectly calculated elsewhere as 500,000 deaths). However, the chance of this happening were estimated to be less than one in one million, i.e. a chance of one person dying (assuming 5,000 deaths) as less than 1 in 200.

NASA's risk analysis to use plutonium was publicly criticized by Michio Kaku on the grounds that casualties, property damage, and lawsuits resulting from a possible accident, as well as the potential use of other energy sources, such as solar and fuel cells, were underestimated.

== Telemetry ==
The Cassini spacecraft was capable of transmitting in several different telemetry formats. The telemetry subsystem is perhaps the most important subsystem, because without it there could be no data return.

The telemetry was developed from the ground up, due to the spacecraft using a more modern set of computers than previous missions. Therefore, Cassini was the first spacecraft to adopt mini-packets to reduce the complexity of the Telemetry Dictionary, and the software development process led to the creation of a Telemetry Manager for the mission.

There were around 1088 channels (in 67 mini-packets) assembled in the Cassini Telemetry Dictionary. Out of these 67 lower complexity mini-packets, 6 mini-packets contained the subsystem covariance and Kalman gain elements (161 measurements), not used during normal mission operations. This left 947 measurements in 61 mini-packets.

A total of seven telemetry maps corresponding to 7 AACS telemetry modes were constructed. These modes are: (1) Record; (2) Nominal Cruise; (3) Medium Slow Cruise; (4) Slow Cruise; (5) Orbital Ops; (6) Av; (7) ATE (Attitude Estimator) Calibration. These 7 maps cover all spacecraft telemetry modes.

== Huygens probe ==
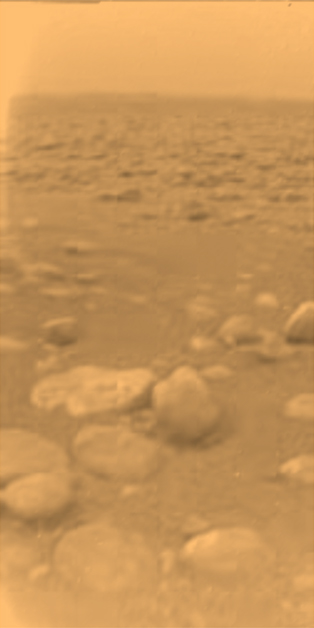
Huygens view of Titan's surface

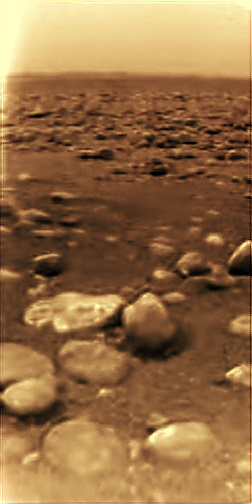
Same image with different data processing

The Huygens probe, supplied by the European Space Agency (ESA) and named after the 17th century Dutch astronomer who first discovered Titan, Christiaan Huygens, scrutinized the clouds, atmosphere, and surface of Saturn's moon Titan in its descent on January 15, 2005. It was designed to enter and brake in Titan's atmosphere and parachute a fully instrumented robotic laboratory down to the surface.

The probe system consisted of the probe itself which descended to Titan, and the probe support equipment (PSE) which remained attached to the orbiting spacecraft. The PSE includes electronics that track the probe, recover the data gathered during its descent, and process and deliver the data to the orbiter that transmits it to Earth. The core control computer CPU was a redundant MIL-STD-1750A control system.

The data was transmitted by a radio link between Huygens and Cassini provided by Probe Data Relay Subsystem (PDRS). As the probe's mission could not be telecommanded from Earth because of the great distance, it was automatically managed by the Command Data Management Subsystem (CDMS). The PDRS and CDMS were provided by the Italian Space Agency (ASI).

After Cassini's launch, it was discovered that data sent from the Huygens probe to Cassini orbiter (and then re-transmitted to Earth) would be largely unreadable. The cause was that the bandwidth of signal processing electronics was too narrow and the anticipated Doppler shift between the lander and the mother craft would put the signals out of the system's range. Thus, Cassini's receiver would be unable to receive the data from Huygens during its descent to Titan.

A work-around was found to recover the mission. The trajectory of Cassini was altered to reduce the line of sight velocity and therefore the doppler shift. Cassini's subsequent trajectory was identical to the previously planned one, although the change replaced two orbits prior to the Huygens mission with three, shorter orbits.

== Selected events and discoveries ==
Animation of Cassini's trajectory from October 15, 1997, to May 4, 2008.: Cassini–Huygens; Jupiter; Saturn; Earth; Venus; 2685 Masursky

Animation of Cassini's trajectory around Saturn from May 1, 2004, to September 15, 2017.: Cassini; Saturn; Enceladus; Titan; Iapetus

=== Venus and Earth fly-bys and the cruise to Jupiter ===
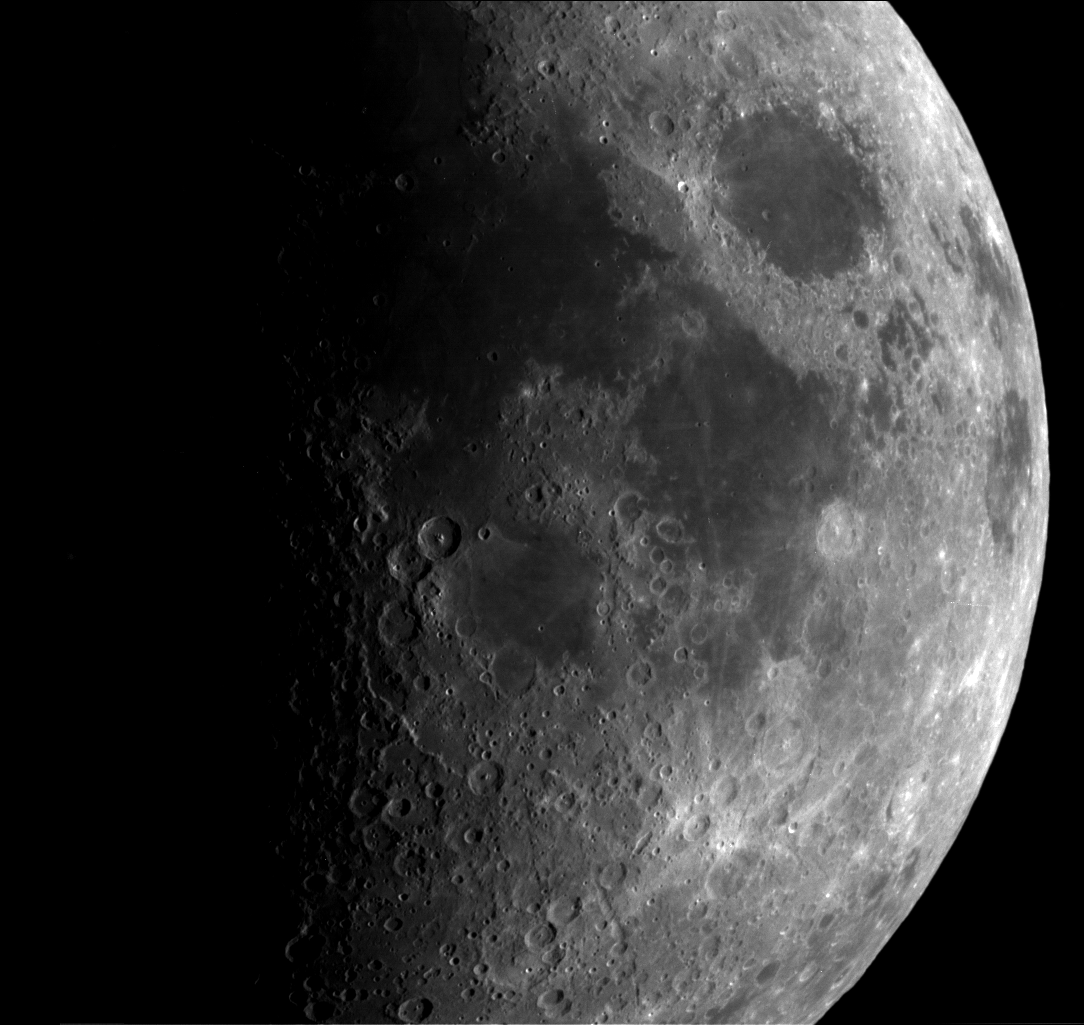
Picture of the Moon during flyby

The Cassini space probe performed two gravitational-assist flybys of Venus on April 26, 1998, and June 24, 1999. These flybys provided the space probe with enough momentum to travel all the way out to the asteroid belt, while the Sun's gravity pulled the space probe back into the inner Solar System.

On August 18, 1999, at 03:28 UTC, the craft made a gravitational-assist flyby of the Earth. One hour and 20 minutes before closest approach, Cassini made its closest approach to the Earth's Moon at 377,000 kilometers, and it took a series of calibration photos.

On January 23, 2000, Cassini performed a flyby of the asteroid 2685 Masursky at around 10:00 UTC. It took photos in the period five to seven hours before the flyby at a distance of 1.6×10^{6} km (0.99×10^{6} mi) and a diameter of 15 to 20 km (9.3 to 12.4 mi) was estimated for the asteroid.

=== Jupiter flyby ===
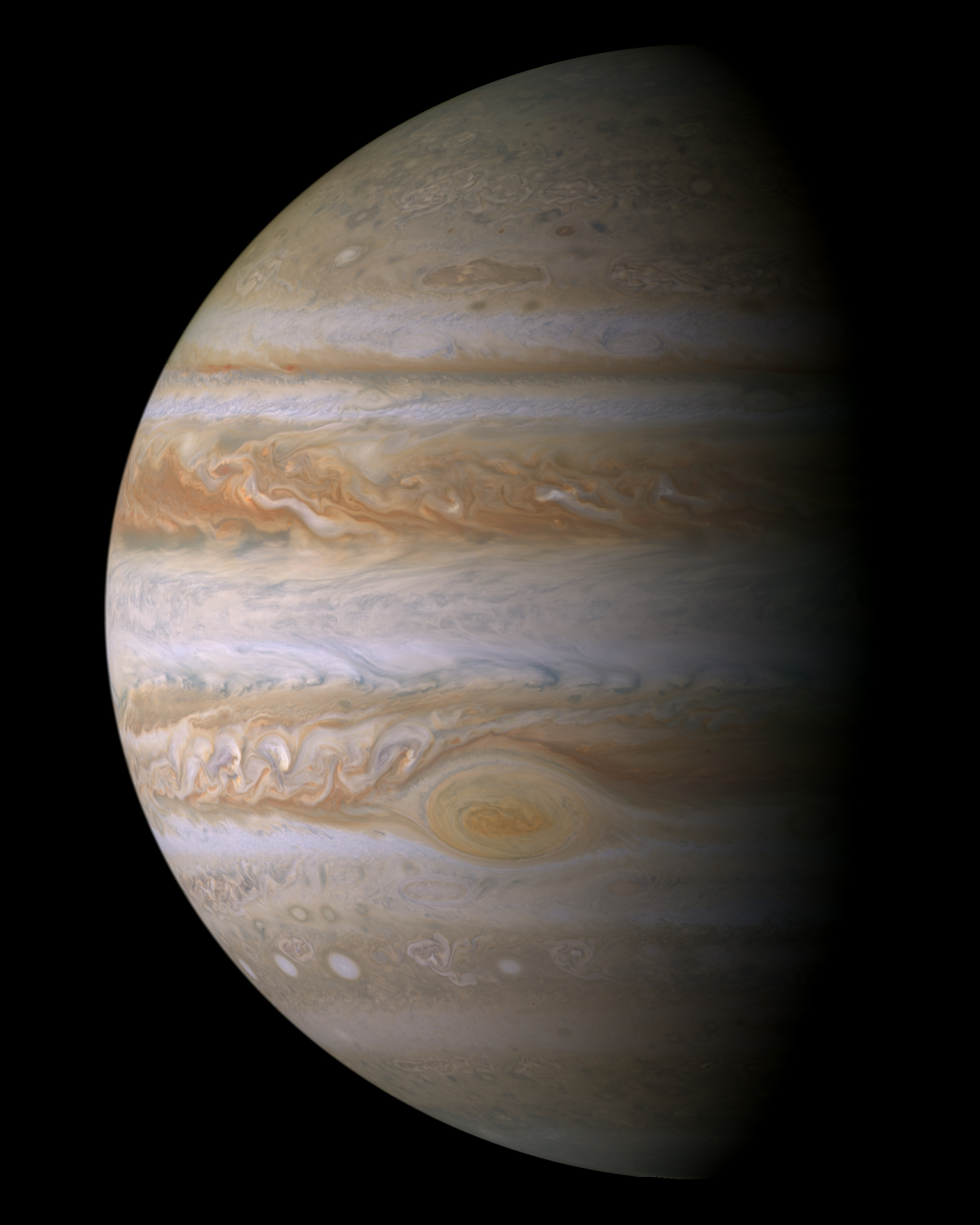
A Jupiter flyby picture

Cassini made its closest approach to Jupiter on December 30, 2000, at 9.7 million kilometers, and made many scientific measurements. About 26,000 images of Jupiter, its faint rings, and its moons were taken during the six-month flyby. It produced the most detailed global color portrait of the planet yet (see image at right), in which the smallest visible features are approximately 60 km (37 mi) across.

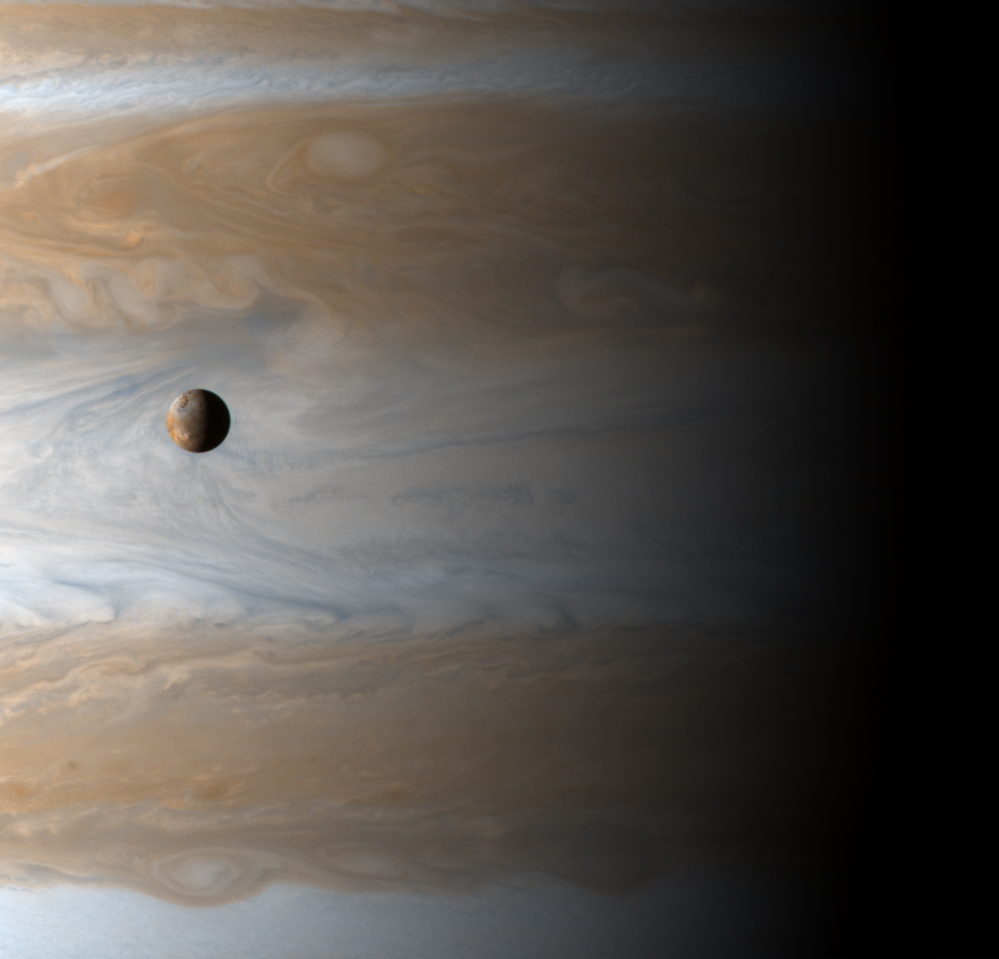
Cassini photographed Io transiting Jupiter on January 1, 2001.

A major finding of the flyby, announced on March 6, 2003, was of Jupiter's atmospheric circulation. Dark "belts" alternate with light "zones" in the atmosphere, and scientists had long considered the zones, with their pale clouds, to be areas of upwelling air, partly because many clouds on Earth form where air is rising. But analysis of Cassini imagery showed that individual storm cells of upwelling bright-white clouds, too small to see from Earth, pop up almost without exception in the dark belts. According to Anthony Del Genio of NASA's Goddard Institute for Space Studies, "the belts must be the areas of net-rising atmospheric motion on Jupiter, [so] the net motion in the zones has to be sinking".

Other atmospheric observations included a swirling dark oval of high atmospheric haze, about the size of the Great Red Spot, near Jupiter's north pole. Infrared imagery revealed aspects of circulation near the poles, with bands of globe-encircling winds, with adjacent bands moving in opposite directions.

The same announcement also discussed the nature of Jupiter's rings. Light scattering by particles in the rings showed the particles were irregularly shaped (rather than spherical) and likely originate as ejecta from micrometeorite impacts on Jupiter's moons, probably Metis and Adrastea.

=== Tests of general relativity ===
On October 10, 2003, the mission's science team announced the results of tests of Albert Einstein's general theory of relativity, performed by using radio waves transmitted from the Cassini space probe. The radio scientists measured a frequency shift in the radio waves to and from the spacecraft, as they passed close to the Sun. According to the general theory of relativity, a massive object like the Sun causes space-time to curve, causing a beam of radiowaves travelling out of its gravitational well to decrease in frequency and radiowaves travelling into the gravitational well to increase in frequency, referred to as gravitational redshift / blueshift.

Although some measurable deviations from the values calculated using the general theory of relativity are predicted by some unusual cosmological models, no such deviations were found by this experiment. Previous tests using radiowaves transmitted by the Viking and Voyager space probes were in agreement with the calculated values from general relativity to within an accuracy of one part in one thousand. The more refined measurements from the Cassini space probe experiment improved this accuracy to about one part in 51,000. (Note: This is currently the best measurement of post-Newtonian parameter γ; the result γ = 1 + (2.1 ± 2.3) × 10^{−5} agrees with the prediction of standard General Relativity, γ = 1) The data firmly support Einstein's general theory of relativity.

=== New moons of Saturn ===
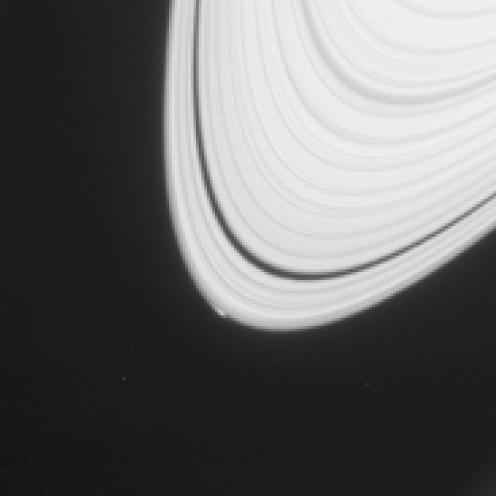
The possible formation of a new moon was captured on April 15, 2013.

In total, the Cassini mission discovered seven new moons orbiting Saturn. Using images taken by Cassini, researchers discovered Methone, Pallene and Polydeuces in 2004, although later analysis revealed that Voyager 2 had photographed Pallene in its 1981 flyby of the ringed planet.

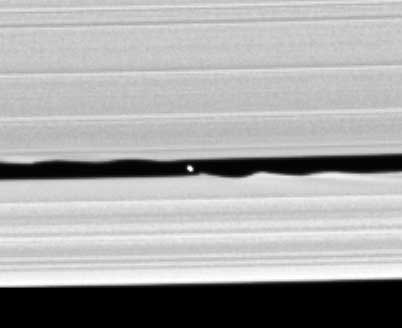
Discovery photograph of moon Daphnis

On May 1, 2005, a new moon was discovered by Cassini in the Keeler gap. It was given the designation S/2005 S 1 before being named Daphnis. A fifth new moon was discovered by Cassini on May 30, 2007, and was provisionally labeled S/2007 S 4. It is now known as Anthe. A press release on February 3, 2009, showed a sixth new moon found by Cassini. The moon is approximately 500 m (0.3 mi) in diameter within the G-ring of the ring system of Saturn, and is now named Aegaeon (formerly S/2008 S 1). A press release on November 2, 2009, mentions the seventh new moon found by Cassini on July 26, 2009. It is presently labeled S/2009 S 1 and is approximately 300 m (980 ft) in diameter in the B-ring system.

On April 14, 2014, NASA scientists reported the possible beginning of a new moon in Saturn's A Ring.

=== Phoebe flyby ===
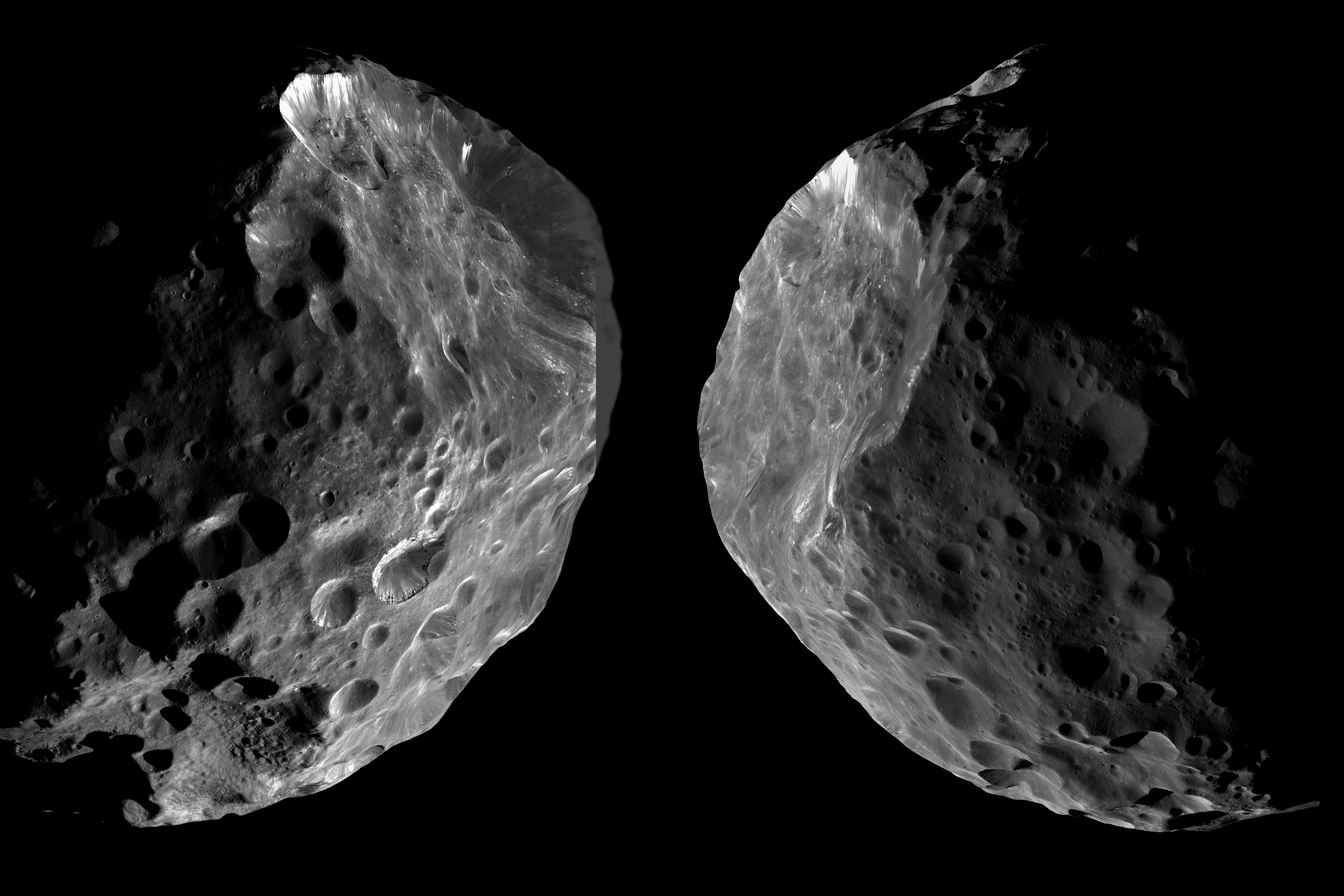
Cassini arrival (left) and departure mosaics of Phoebe (2004)

On June 11, 2004, Cassini flew by the moon Phoebe. This was the first opportunity for close-up studies of this moon (Voyager 2 performed a distant flyby in 1981 but returned no detailed images). It also was Cassini's only possible flyby for Phoebe due to the mechanics of the available orbits around Saturn.

The first close-up images were received on June 12, 2004, and mission scientists immediately realized that the surface of Phoebe looks different from asteroids visited by spacecraft. Parts of the heavily cratered surface look very bright in those pictures, and it is currently believed that a large amount of water ice exists under its immediate surface.

=== Saturn rotation ===
In an announcement on June 28, 2004, Cassini program scientists described the measurement of the rotational period of Saturn. Because there are no fixed features on the surface that can be used to obtain this period, the repetition of radio emissions was used. This new data agreed with the latest values measured from Earth, and constituted a puzzle to the scientists. It turns out that the radio rotational period had changed since it was first measured in 1980 by Voyager 1, and it was now 6 minutes longer. This, however, does not indicate a change in the overall spin of the planet. It is thought to be due to variations in the upper atmosphere and ionosphere at the latitudes which are magnetically connected to the radio source region.

In 2019 NASA announced Saturn's rotational period as 10 hours, 33 minutes, 38 seconds, calculated using Saturnian ring seismology. Vibrations from Saturn's interior cause oscillations in its gravitational field. This energy is absorbed by ring particles in specific locations, where it accumulates until it is released in a wave. Scientists used data from more than 20 of these waves to construct a family of models of Saturn's interior, providing basis for calculating its rotational period.

=== Orbiting Saturn ===
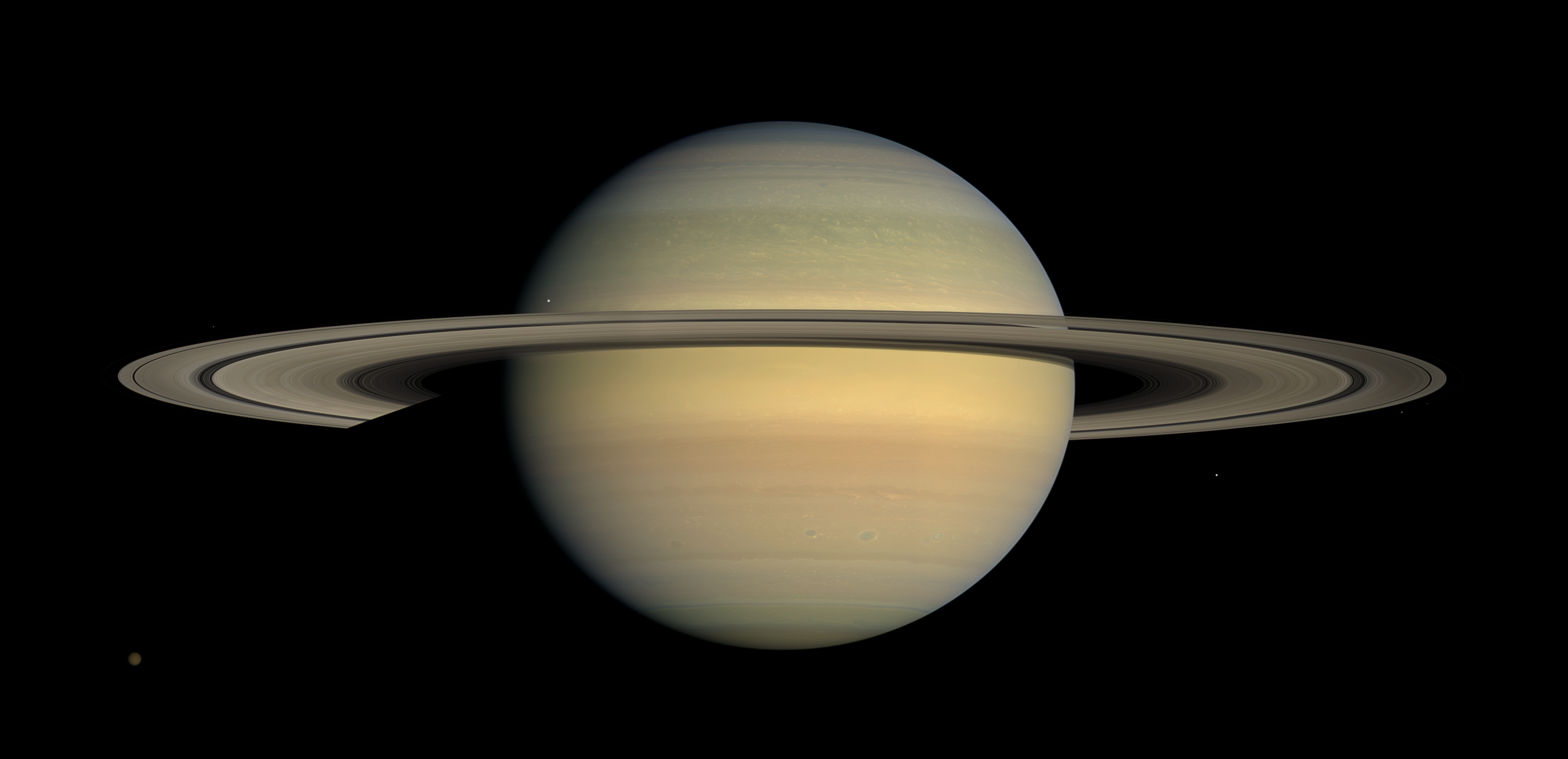
Saturn reached equinox in 2008, shortly after the end of the prime mission.

On July 1, 2004, the spacecraft flew through the gap between the F and G rings and achieved orbit, after a seven-year voyage. It was the first spacecraft to orbit Saturn.

The Saturn Orbital Insertion (SOI) maneuver performed by Cassini was complex, requiring the craft to orient its High-Gain Antenna away from Earth and along its flight path, to shield its instruments from particles in Saturn's rings. Once the craft crossed the ring plane, it had to rotate again to point its engine along its flight path, and then the engine fired to decelerate the craft by 622 m/s to allow Saturn to capture it. Cassini was captured by Saturn's gravity at around 8:54 pm Pacific Daylight Time on June 30, 2004. During the maneuver Cassini passed within 20,000 km (12,000 mi) of Saturn's cloud tops.

=== Titan flybys ===
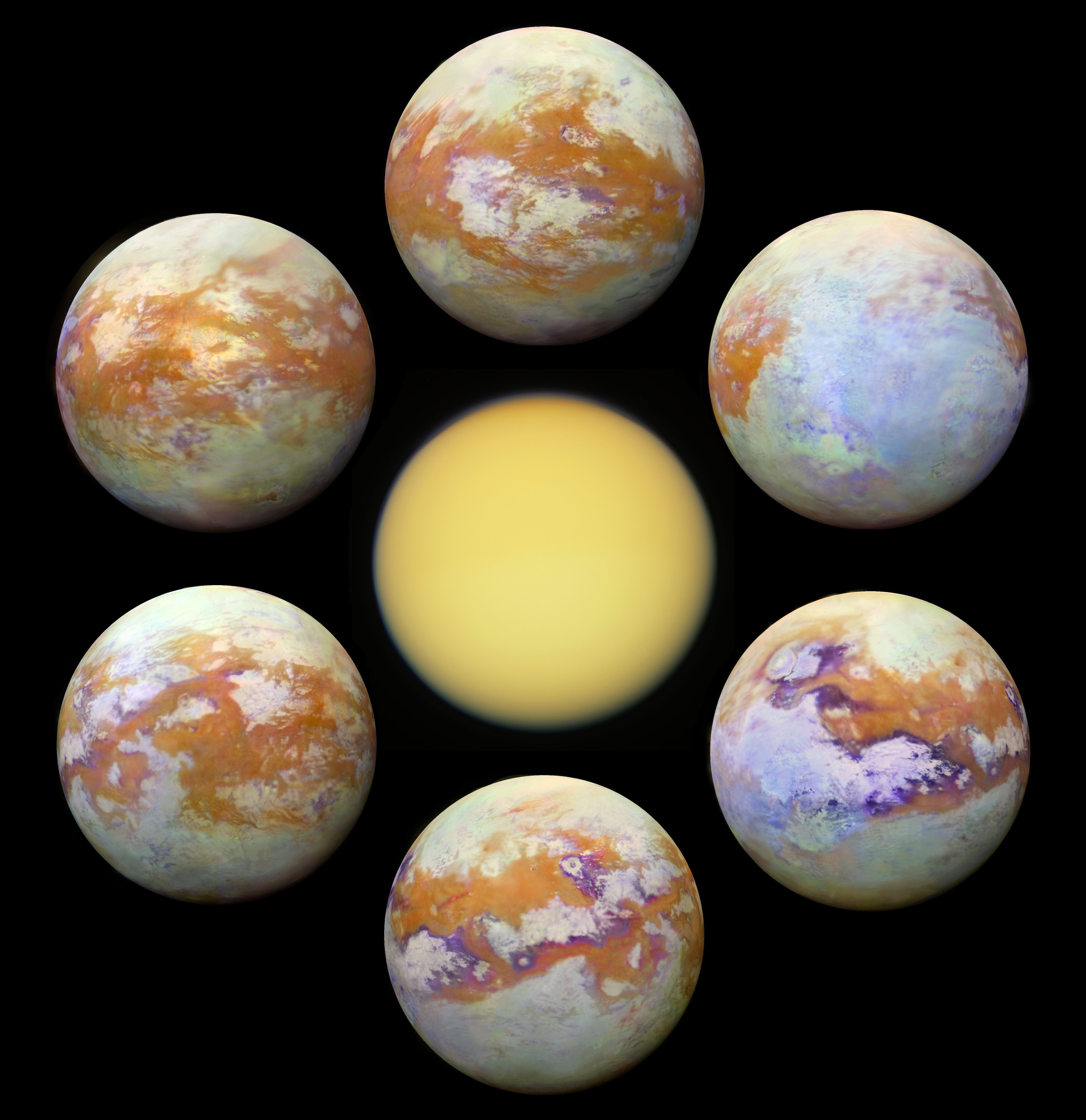
Titan – infrared views (2004 – 2017)

Cassini had its first flyby of Saturn's largest moon, Titan, on July 2, 2004, a day after orbit insertion, when it approached to within 339,000 km (211,000 mi) of Titan. Images taken through special filters (able to see through the moon's global haze) showed south polar clouds thought to be composed of methane and surface features with widely differing brightness. On October 27, 2004, the spacecraft executed the first of the 45 planned close flybys of Titan when it passed a mere 1,200 km (750 mi) above the moon. Almost four gigabits of data were collected and transmitted to Earth, including the first radar images of the moon's haze-enshrouded surface. It revealed the surface of Titan (at least the area covered by radar) to be relatively level, with topography reaching no more than about 50 m (160 ft) in altitude. The flyby provided a remarkable increase in imaging resolution over previous coverage. Images with up to 100 times better resolution were taken and are typical of resolutions planned for subsequent Titan flybys. Cassini collected pictures of Titan and the lakes of methane were similar to the lakes of water on Earth.

=== Huygens lands on Titan ===
External image
- Raw images from the Huygens probe descent on 14 January 2005 (37 pages); ESA/NASA/JPL/University of Arizona (ESA hosting)

Cassini released the Huygens probe on December 25, 2004, by means of a spring and spiral rails intended to rotate the probe for greater stability. It entered the atmosphere of Titan on January 14, 2005, and after a two-and-a-half-hour descent landed on solid ground. Although Cassini successfully relayed 350 of the pictures that it received from Huygens of its descent and landing site, a malfunction in one of the communications channels resulted in the loss of a further 350 pictures.

=== Enceladus flybys ===
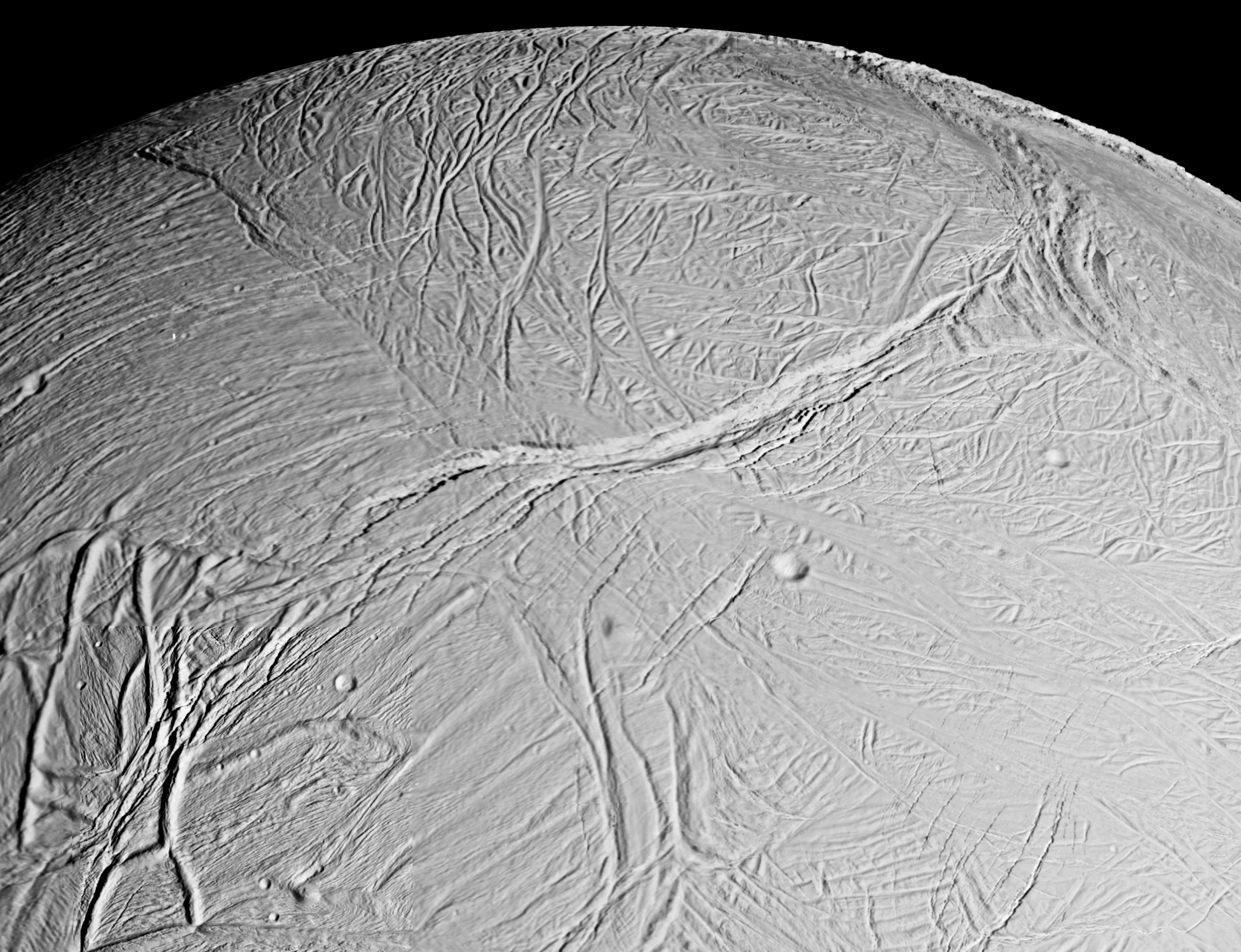
View of Enceladus's Europa-like surface with the Labtayt Sulci fractures at center and the Ebony (left) and Cufa dorsa at lower left; imaged by Cassini on February 17, 2005

During the first two close flybys of the moon Enceladus in 2005, Cassini discovered a deflection in the local magnetic field that is characteristic for the existence of a thin but significant atmosphere. Other measurements obtained at that time point to ionized water vapor as its main constituent. Cassini later observed water ice geysers erupting from the south pole of Enceladus, which gives more credibility to the idea that Enceladus is supplying the particles of Saturn's E ring. Mission scientists began to suspect that there may be pockets of liquid water near the surface of the moon that fuel the eruptions.

On March 12, 2008, Cassini made a close fly-by of Enceladus, passing within 50 km of the moon's surface. The spacecraft passed through the plumes extending from its southern geysers, detecting water, carbon dioxide and various hydrocarbons with its mass spectrometer, while also mapping surface features that are at much higher temperature than their surroundings with the infrared spectrometer. Cassini was unable to collect data with its cosmic dust analyzer due to an unknown software malfunction.

On November 21, 2009, Cassini made its eighth flyby of Enceladus, this time with a different geometry, approaching within 1,600 km (990 mi) of the surface. The Composite Infrared Spectrograph (CIRS) instrument produced a map of thermal emissions from the Baghdad Sulcus 'tiger stripe'. The data returned helped create a detailed and high resolution mosaic image of the southern part of the moon's Saturn-facing hemisphere.

On April 3, 2014, nearly ten years after Cassini entered Saturn's orbit, NASA reported evidence of a large salty internal ocean of liquid water in Enceladus. The presence of an internal salty ocean in contact with the moon's rocky core, places Enceladus "among the most likely places in the Solar System to host alien microbial life". On June 30, 2014, NASA celebrated ten years of Cassini exploring Saturn and its moons, highlighting the discovery of water activity on Enceladus among other findings.

In September 2015, NASA announced that gravitational and imaging data from Cassini were used to analyze the librations of Enceladus's orbit and determined that the moon's surface is not rigidly joined to its core, concluding that the underground ocean must therefore be global in extent.

On October 28, 2015, Cassini performed a close flyby of Enceladus, coming within 49 km (30 mi) of the surface, and passing through the icy plume above the south pole.

On December 14, 2023, astronomers reported the first time discovery, in the plumes of Enceladus, of hydrogen cyanide, a possible chemical essential for life as we know it, as well as other organic molecules, some of which are yet to be better identified and understood. According to the researchers, "these [newly discovered] compounds could potentially support extant microbial communities or drive complex organic synthesis leading to the origin of life".

=== Radio occultations of Saturn's rings ===
In May 2005, Cassini began a series of radio occultation experiments, to measure the size-distribution of particles in Saturn's rings, and measure the atmosphere of Saturn itself. For over four months, the craft completed orbits designed for this purpose. During these experiments, it flew behind the ring plane of Saturn, as seen from Earth, and transmitted radio waves through the particles. The radio signals received on Earth were analyzed, for frequency, phase, and power shift of the signal to determine the structure of the rings.

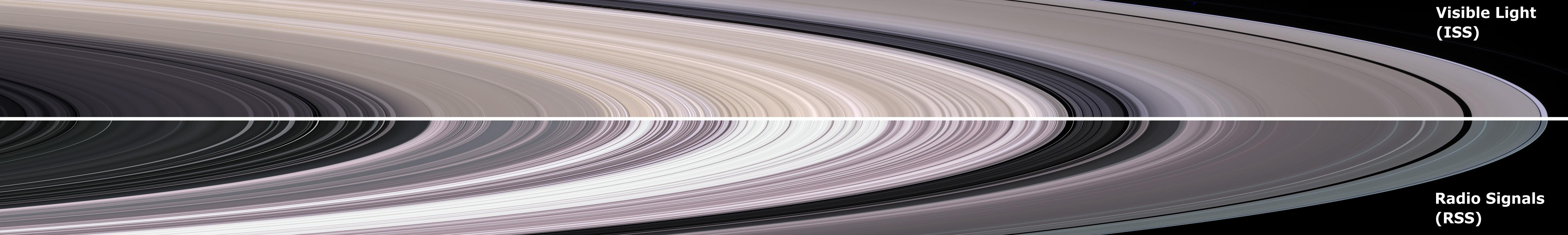
Upper image: visible color mosaic of Saturn's rings taken on December 12, 2004. Lower image: simulated view constructed from a radio occultation observation on May 3, 2005. Color in the lower image represents ring particle sizes.

=== Spokes in rings verified ===
In images captured September 5, 2005, Cassini detected spokes in Saturn's rings, previously seen only by the visual observer Stephen James O'Meara in 1977 and then confirmed by the Voyager space probes in the early 1980s.

=== Lakes of Titan ===
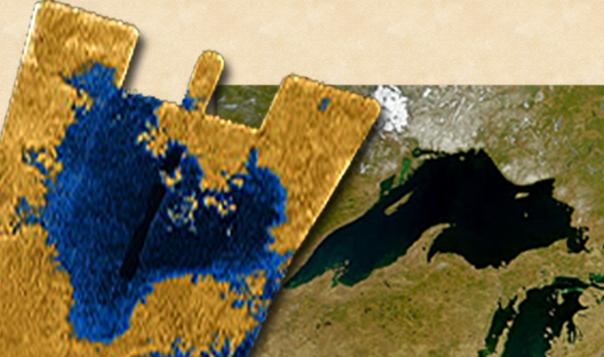
Ligeia Mare, on the left, is compared at scale to Lake Superior.

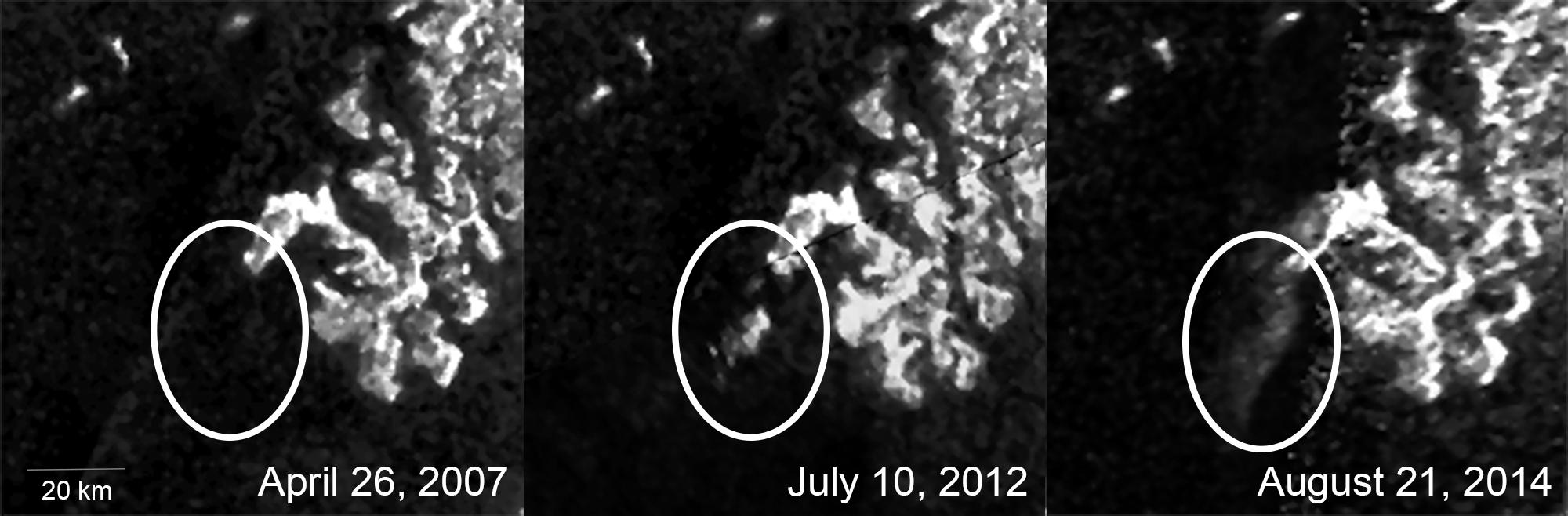
Titan: evolving feature in Ligeia Mare (August 21, 2014)

Radar images obtained on July 21, 2006, appear to show lakes of liquid hydrocarbon (such as methane and ethane) in Titan's northern latitudes. This is the first discovery of currently existing lakes anywhere besides on Earth. The lakes range in size from one to one-hundred kilometers across.

On March 13, 2007, the Jet Propulsion Laboratory announced that it had found strong evidence of seas of methane and ethane in the northern hemisphere of Titan. At least one of these is larger than any of the Great Lakes in North America.

=== Saturn hurricane ===
In November 2006, scientists discovered a storm at the south pole of Saturn with a distinct eyewall. This is characteristic of a hurricane on Earth and had never been seen on another planet before. Unlike a terrestrial hurricane, the storm appears to be stationary at the pole. The storm is 8,000 km (5,000 mi) across, and 70 km (43 mi) high, with winds blowing at 560 km/h (350 mph).

=== Iapetus flyby ===
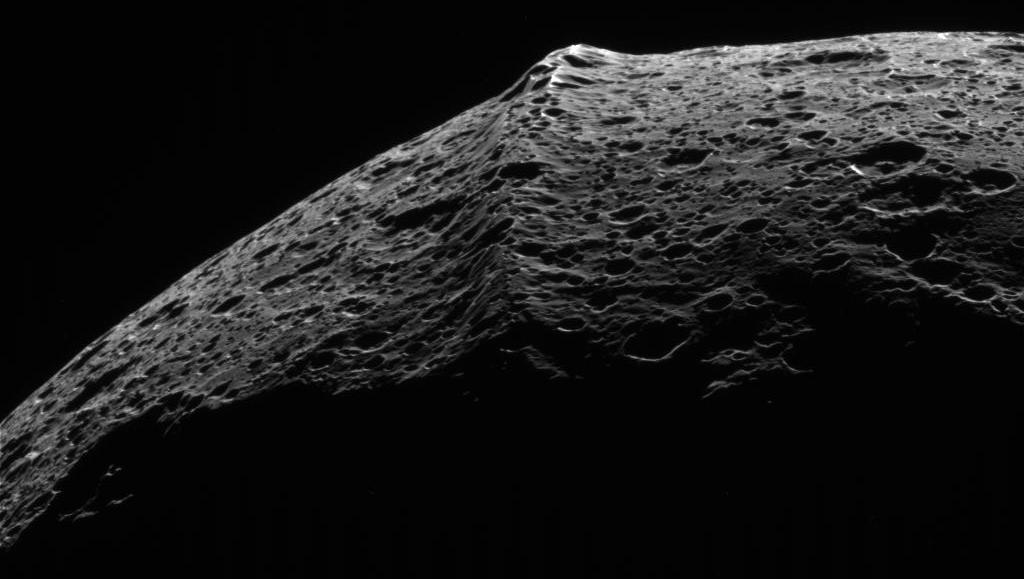
Taken on September 10, 2007, at a distance of 62,331 km (38,731 mi) Iapetus's equatorial ridge and surface are revealed. (CL1 and CL2 filters)

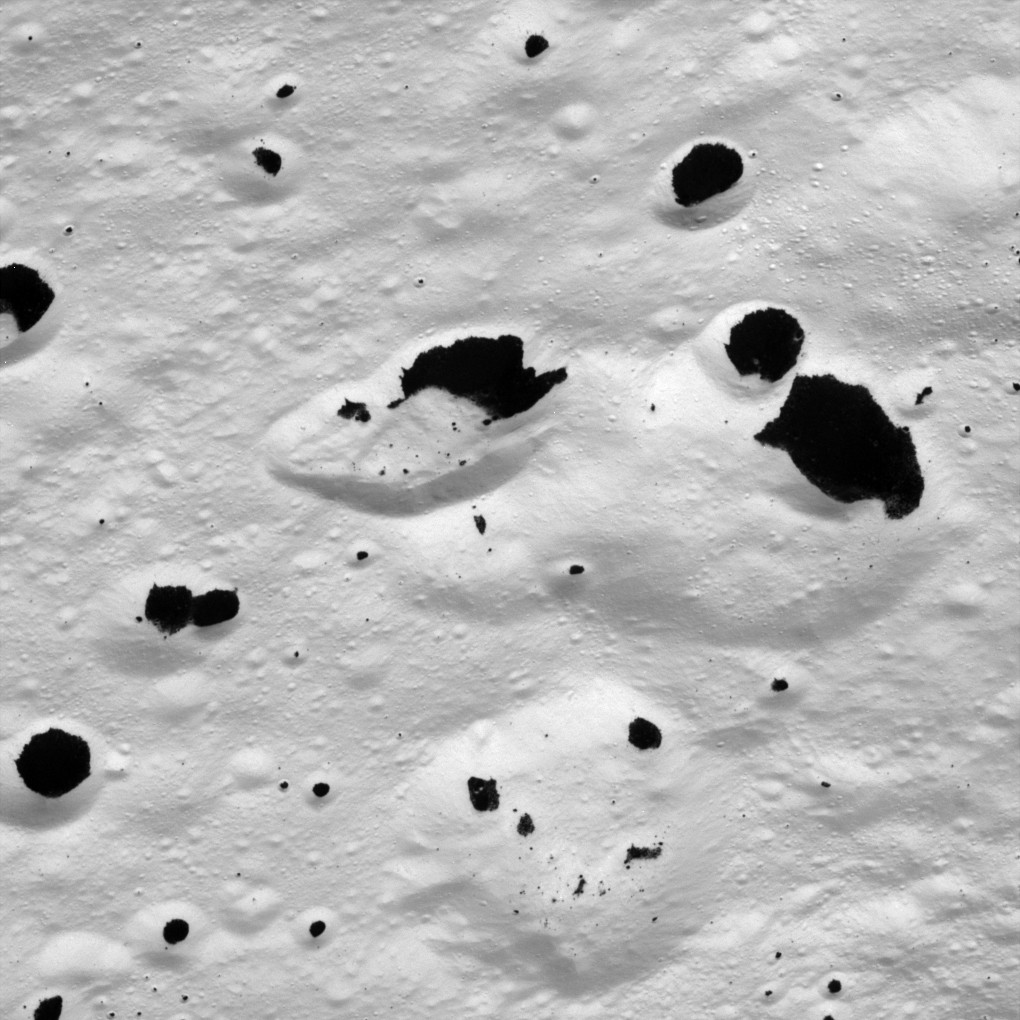
Closeup of Iapetus surface, 2007

On September 10, 2007, Cassini completed its flyby of the strange, two-toned, walnut-shaped moon, Iapetus. Images were taken from 1,600 km (1,000 mi) above the surface. As it was sending the images back to Earth, it was hit by a cosmic ray that forced it to temporarily enter safe mode. All of the data from the flyby was recovered.

=== Mission extension ===
On April 15, 2008, Cassini received funding for a 27-month extended mission. It consisted of 60 more orbits of Saturn, with 21 more close Titan flybys, seven of Enceladus, six of Mimas, eight of Tethys, and one targeted flyby each of Dione, Rhea, and Helene. The extended mission began on July 1, 2008, and was renamed the Cassini Equinox Mission as the mission coincided with Saturn's equinox.

=== Second mission extension ===
A proposal was submitted to NASA for a second mission extension (September 2010 – May 2017), provisionally named the extended-extended mission or XXM. This ($60M pa) was approved in February 2010 and renamed the Cassini Solstice Mission. It included Cassini orbiting Saturn 155 more times, conducting 54 additional flybys of Titan and 11 more of Enceladus.

=== Great Storm of 2010 and aftermath ===
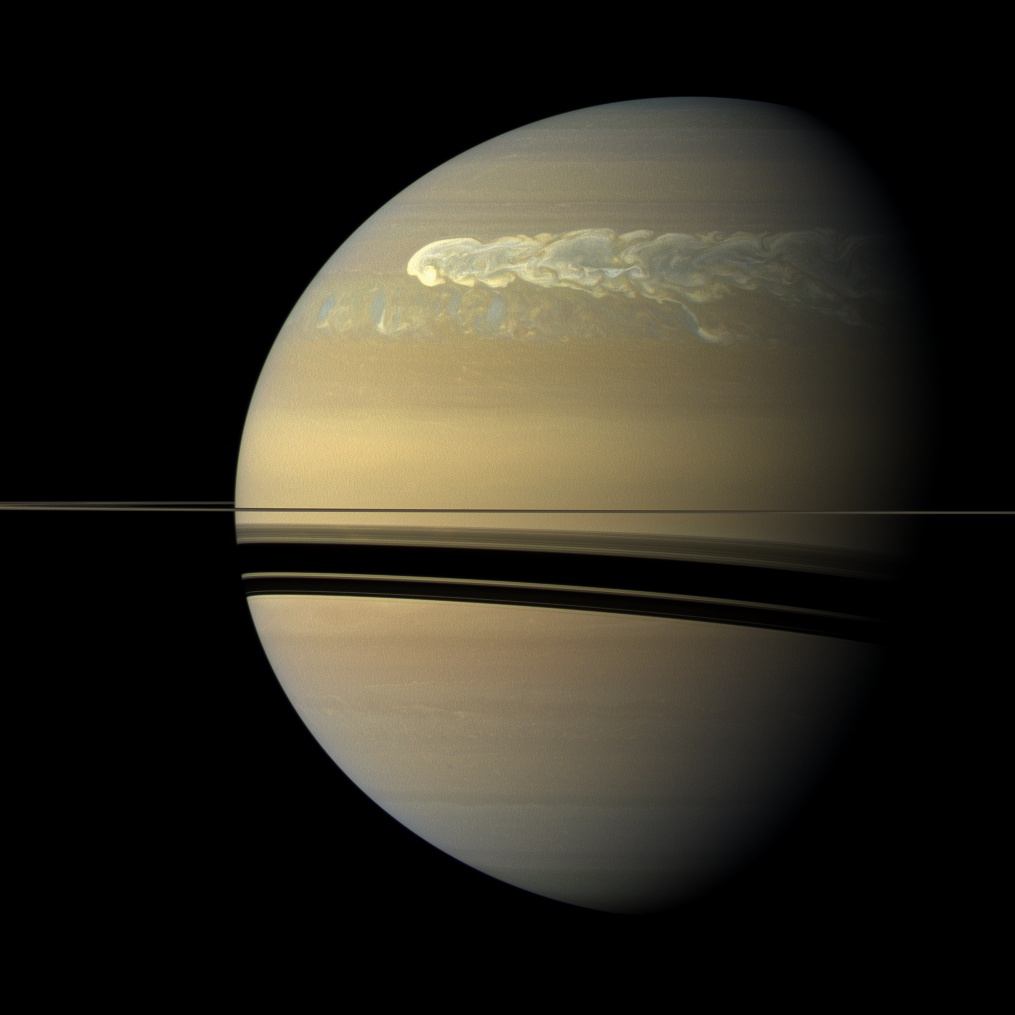
Northern hemisphere storm in 2011

On October 25, 2012, Cassini witnessed the aftermath of the massive Great White Spot storm that recurs roughly every 30 years on Saturn. Data from the composite infrared spectrometer (CIRS) instrument indicated a powerful discharge from the storm that caused a temperature spike in the stratosphere of Saturn 83 K (83 °C; 149 °F) above normal. Simultaneously, a huge increase in ethylene gas was detected by NASA researchers at Goddard Research Center in Greenbelt, Maryland. Ethylene is a colorless gas that is highly uncommon on Saturn and is produced both naturally and through man-made sources on Earth. The storm that produced this discharge was first observed by the spacecraft on December 5, 2010, in Saturn's northern hemisphere. The storm is the first of its kind to be observed by a spacecraft in orbit around Saturn as well as the first to be observed at thermal infrared wavelengths, allowing scientists to observe the temperature of Saturn's atmosphere and track phenomena that are invisible to the naked eye. The spike of ethylene gas that was produced by the storm reached levels that were 100 times more than those thought possible for Saturn. Scientists have also determined that the storm witnessed was the largest, hottest stratospheric vortex ever detected in the Solar System, initially being larger than Jupiter's Great Red Spot.

=== Venus transit ===
On December 21, 2012, Cassini observed a transit of Venus across the Sun. The VIMS instrument analyzed sunlight passing through the Venusian atmosphere. VIMS previously observed the transit of exoplanet HD 189733 b.

=== The Day the Earth Smiled ===
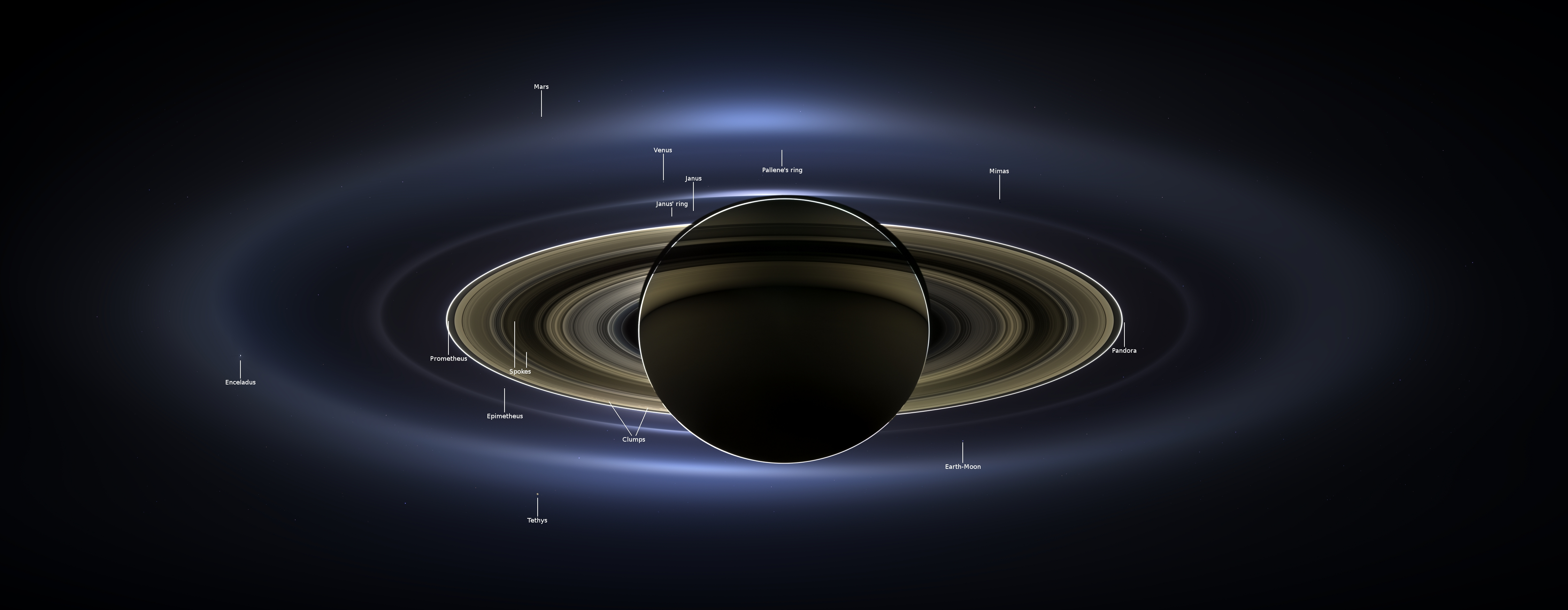
The Day the Earth Smiled – Saturn with some of its moons, Earth, Venus, and Mars as visible in this Cassini montage (July 19, 2013)

On July 19, 2013, the probe was pointed towards Earth to capture an image of the Earth and the Moon, as part of a natural light, multi-image portrait of the entire Saturn system. The event was unique as it was the first time NASA informed the public that a long-distance photo was being taken in advance. The imaging team said they wanted people to smile and wave to the skies, with Cassini scientist Carolyn Porco describing the moment as a chance to "celebrate life on the Pale Blue Dot".

=== Rhea flyby ===
On February 10, 2015, the Cassini spacecraft visited Rhea more closely, coming within 47,000 km (29,000 mi). The spacecraft observed the moon with its cameras producing some of the highest resolution color images yet of Rhea.

=== Hyperion flyby ===
Cassini performed its latest flyby of Saturn's moon Hyperion on May 31, 2015, at a distance of about 34,000 km (21,000 mi).

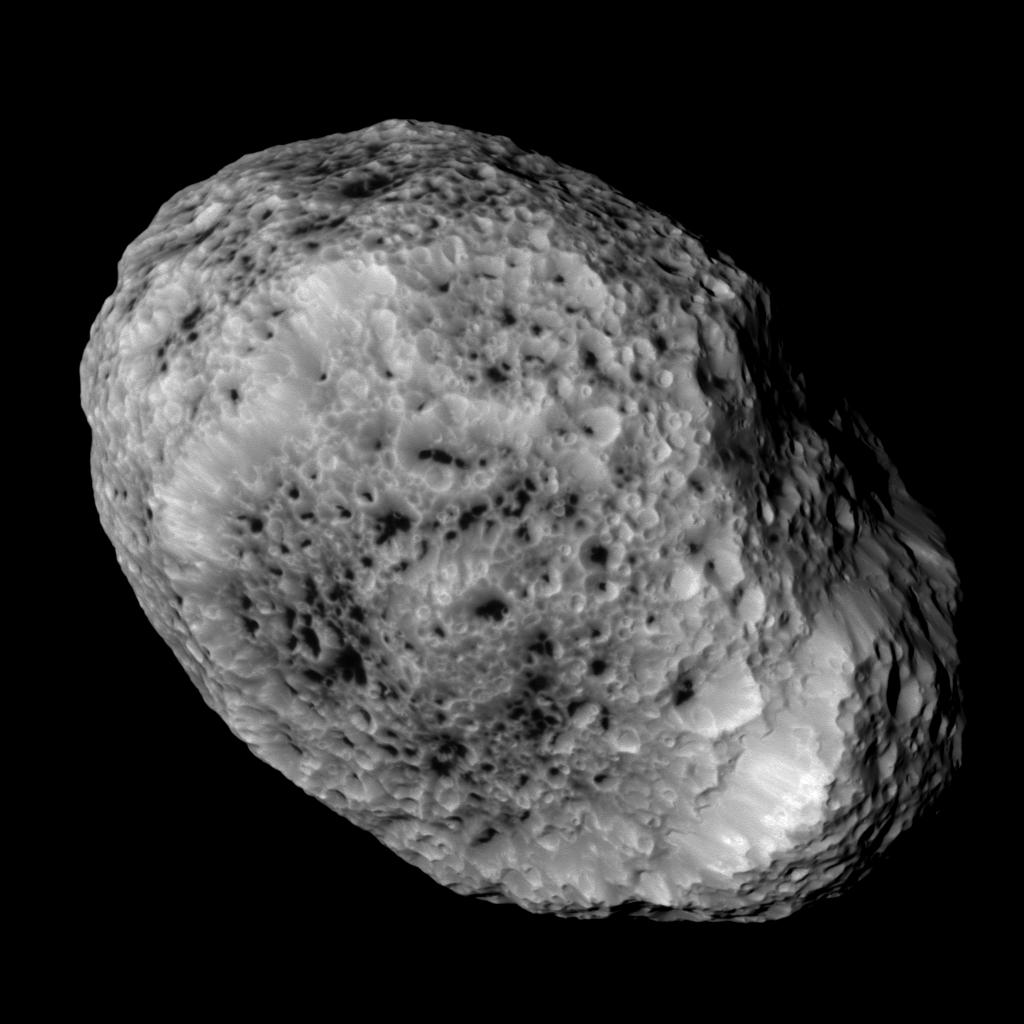
Hyperion – context view from 37,000 km (23,000 mi) (May 31, 2015)

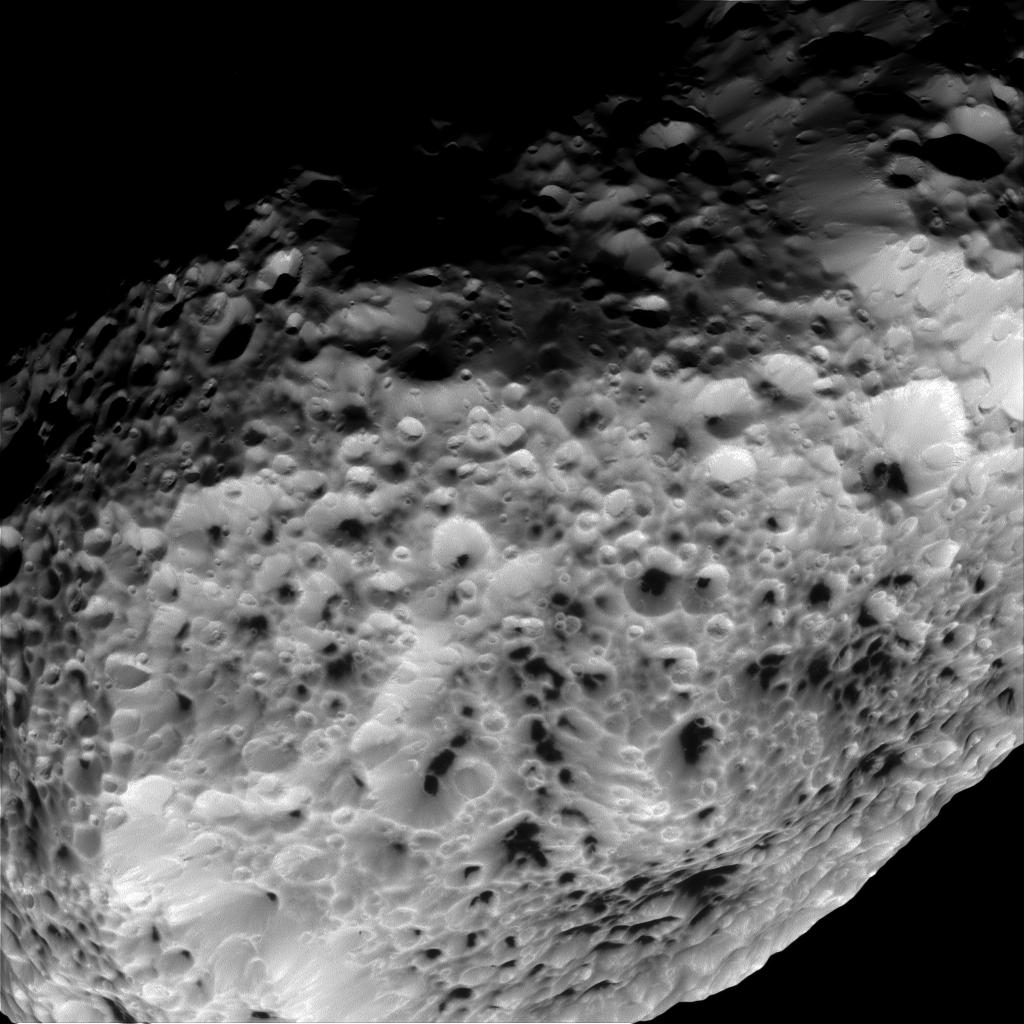
Hyperion – close-up view from 38,000 km (24,000 mi) (May 31, 2015)

=== Dione flyby ===
Cassini performed its last flyby of Saturn's moon Dione on August 17, 2015, at a distance of about 475 km (295 mi). A previous flyby was performed on June 16.

=== Hexagon changes color ===
Between 2012 and 2016, the persistent hexagonal cloud pattern at Saturn's north pole changed from a mostly blue color to more of a golden color. One theory for this is a seasonal change: extended exposure to sunlight may be creating haze as the pole swivels toward the Sun. It was previously noted that there was less blue color overall on Saturn between 2004 and 2008.

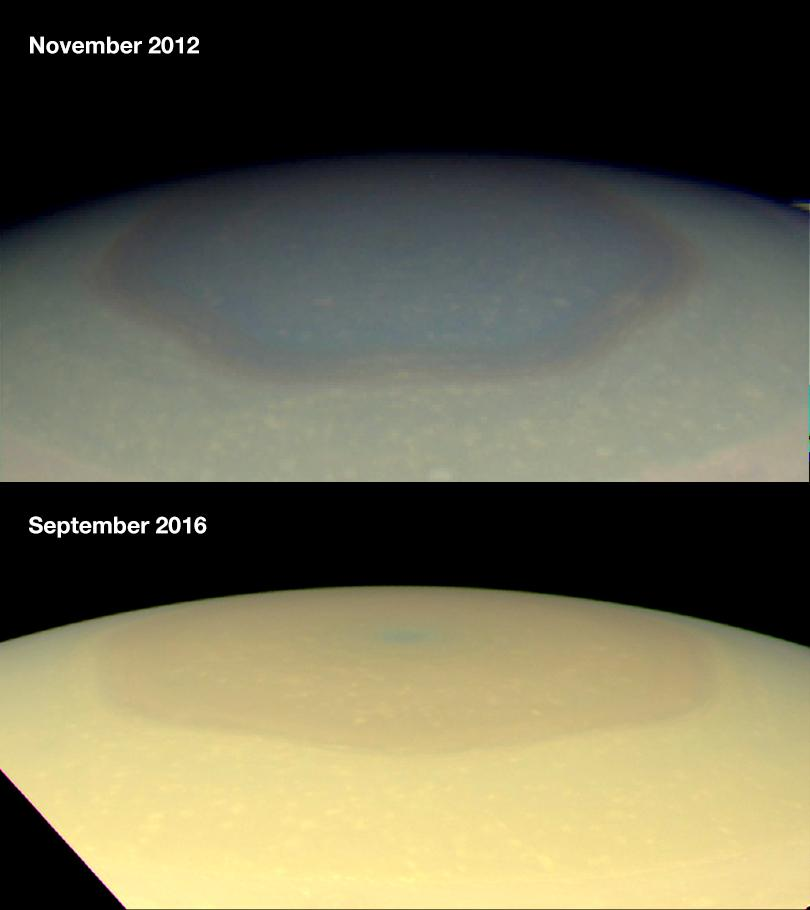
2012 and 2016: hexagon color changes

2013 and 2017: hexagon color changes

== Grand Finale and destruction ==
Animation of Cassini's Grand Finale: Cassini; Saturn

Cassini's end, named the Grand Finale, involved a series of close Saturn passes, approaching within the rings, then an entry into Saturn's atmosphere on September 15, 2017, to destroy the spacecraft. This method was chosen to ensure protection and prevent biological contamination to any of the moons of Saturn thought to offer potential habitability.

In 2008, a number of options were evaluated to achieve this goal, each with varying funding, scientific, and technical challenges. A short period Saturn impact for an end of mission was rated "excellent" with the reasons "D-ring option satisfies unachieved AO goals; cheap and easily achievable" while collision with an icy moon was rated "good" for being "cheap and achievable anywhere/time".

There were problems in 2013–14 about NASA receiving U.S. government funding for the Grand Finale. The two phases of the Grand Finale ended up being the equivalent of having two separate Discovery-class missions in that the Grand Finale was completely different from the main Cassini regular mission. The U.S. government in late 2014 approved the Grand Finale at the cost of $200 million. This was far cheaper than building two new probes in separate Discovery-class missions.

On November 29, 2016, the spacecraft performed a Titan flyby that took it to the gateway of F-ring orbits: This was the start of the Grand Finale phase culminating in its impact with the planet. A final Titan flyby on April 22, 2017, changed the orbit again to fly through the gap between Saturn and its inner ring days later on April 26. Cassini passed about 3,100 km (1,900 mi) above Saturn's cloud layer and 320 km (200 mi) from the visible edge of the inner ring; it successfully took images of Saturn's atmosphere and began returning data the next day. After a further 22 orbits through the gap, the mission was ended with a dive into Saturn's atmosphere on September 15; signal was lost at 11:55:46 UTC on September 15, 2017, 30 seconds later than predicted. It is estimated that the spacecraft burned up about 45 seconds after the last transmission.

In September 2018, NASA won an Emmy Award for Outstanding Original Interactive Program for its presentation of the Cassini mission's Grand Finale at Saturn.

In December 2018, Netflix aired "NASA's Cassini Mission" on their series 7 Days Out documenting the final days of work on the Cassini mission before the spacecraft crashed into Saturn to complete its Grand Finale.

In January 2019, new research using data collected during Cassini's Grand Finale phase was published:

- The final close passes by the rings and planet enabled scientists to measure the length of a day on Saturn: 10 hours, 33 minutes and 38 seconds.
- Saturn's rings are relatively new, 10 to 100 million years old.
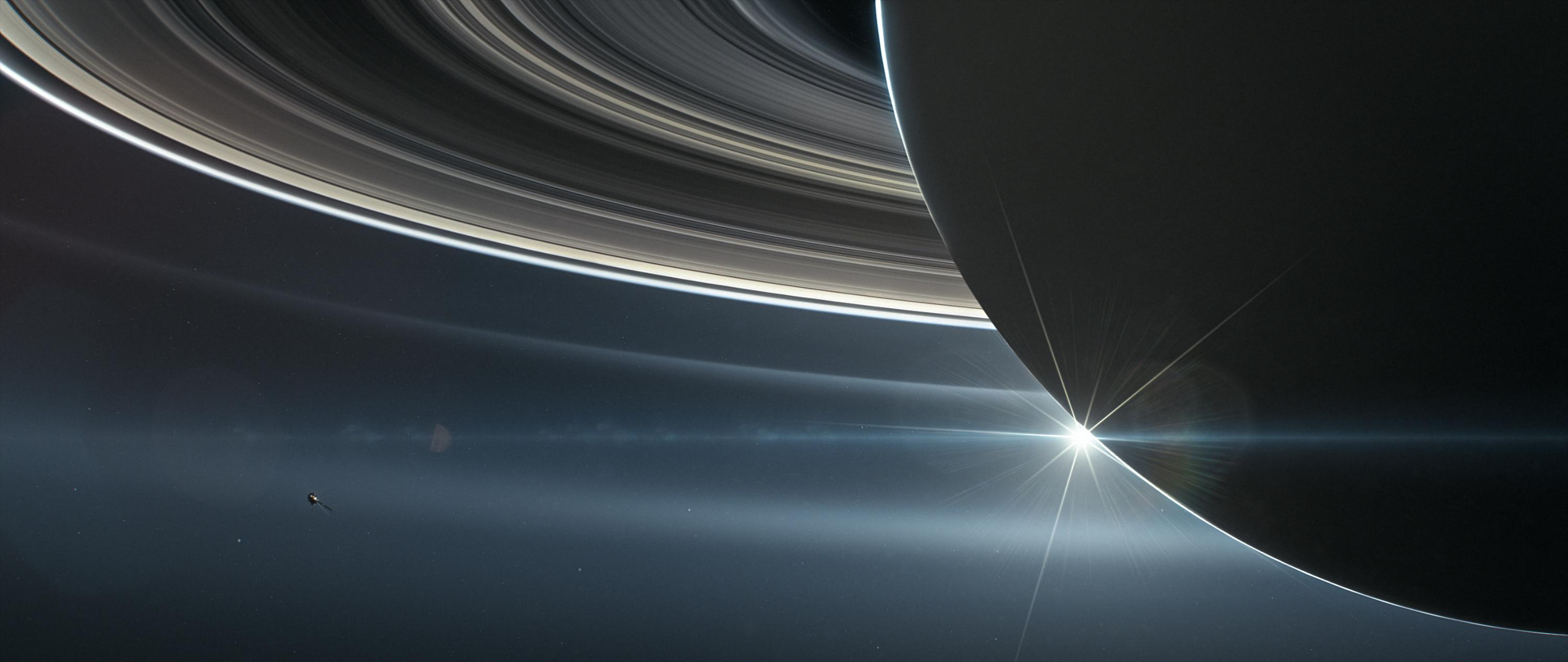
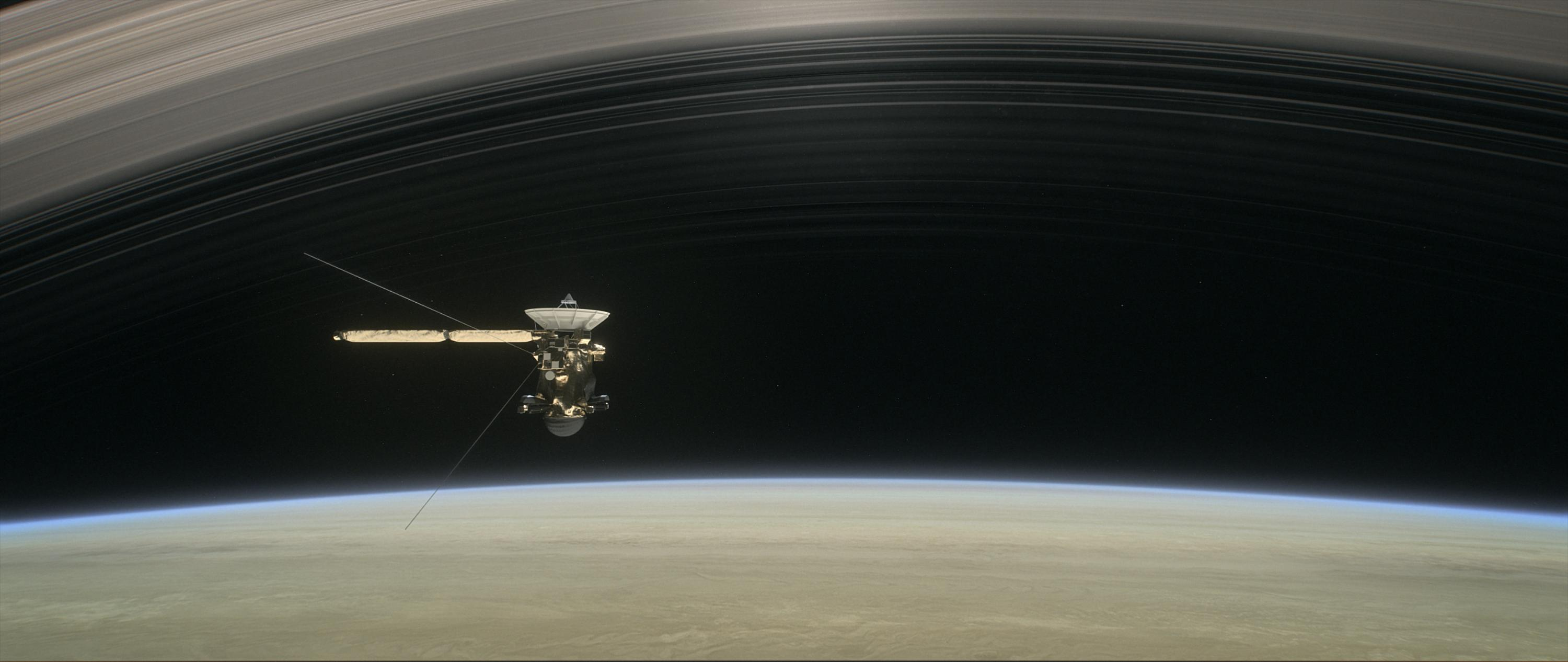
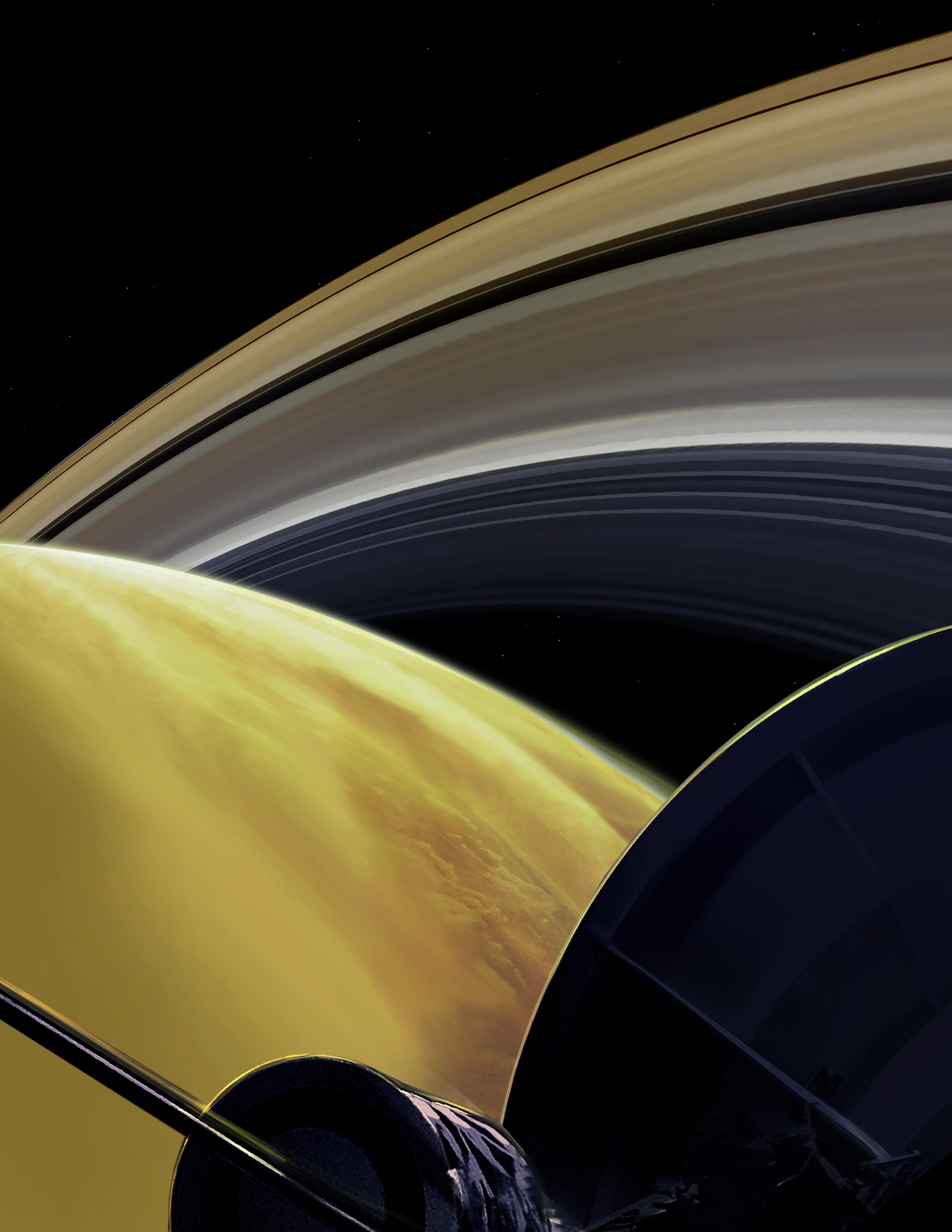
Cassini orbiting Saturn before Grand Finale (artist concepts)

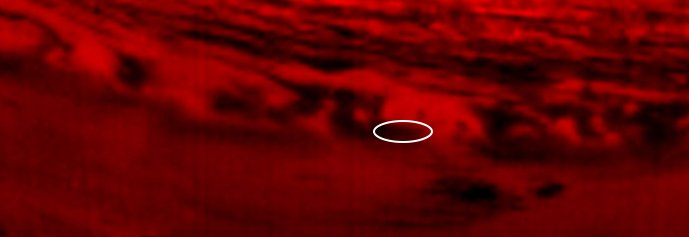
Cassini impact site on Saturn (visual/IR mapping spectrometer; September 15, 2017)

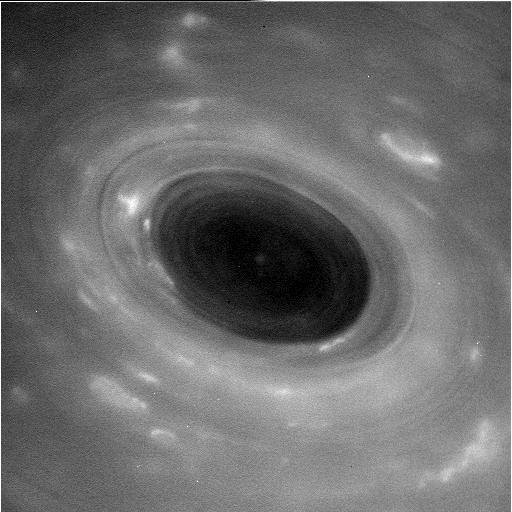
A close-up image of Saturn's atmosphere from about 3,100 km (1,900 mi) above the cloud layer, taken by Cassini on its first dive on April 26, 2017, at the start of the Grand Finale

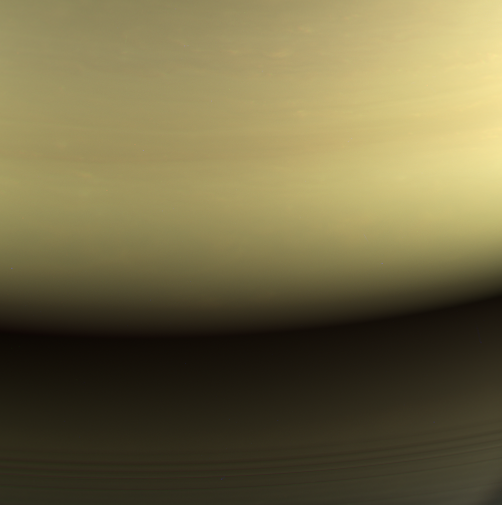
Last image (color) taken by Cassini as it descended toward Saturn. The image was taken 634,000 km (394,000 mi) above Saturn on September 14, 2017, at 19:59 UTC.

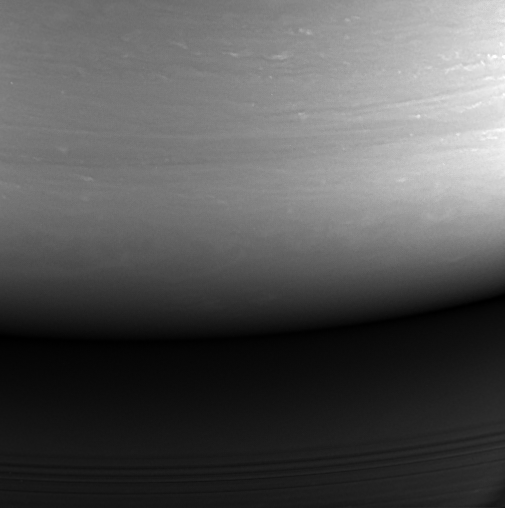
Last image (b&w) taken by the imaging cameras on the Cassini spacecraft (September 14, 2017, at 19:59 UTC)

Video (03:40) detailing Cassini's Grand Finale mission and a look back at what the mission has accomplished.

=== Missions ===
The spacecraft operation was organized around a series of missions. Each was structured according to a certain amount of funding, goals, etc. At least 260 scientists from 17 countries have worked on the Cassini–Huygens mission; in addition thousands of people overall worked to design, manufacture, and launch the mission.

- Prime Mission, July 2004 through June 2008.
- Cassini Equinox Mission was a two-year mission extension which ran from July 2008 through September 2010.
- Cassini Solstice Mission ran from October 2010 through April 2017. (Also known as the XXM mission.)
- Grand Finale (spacecraft directed into Saturn), April 2017 to September 15, 2017.
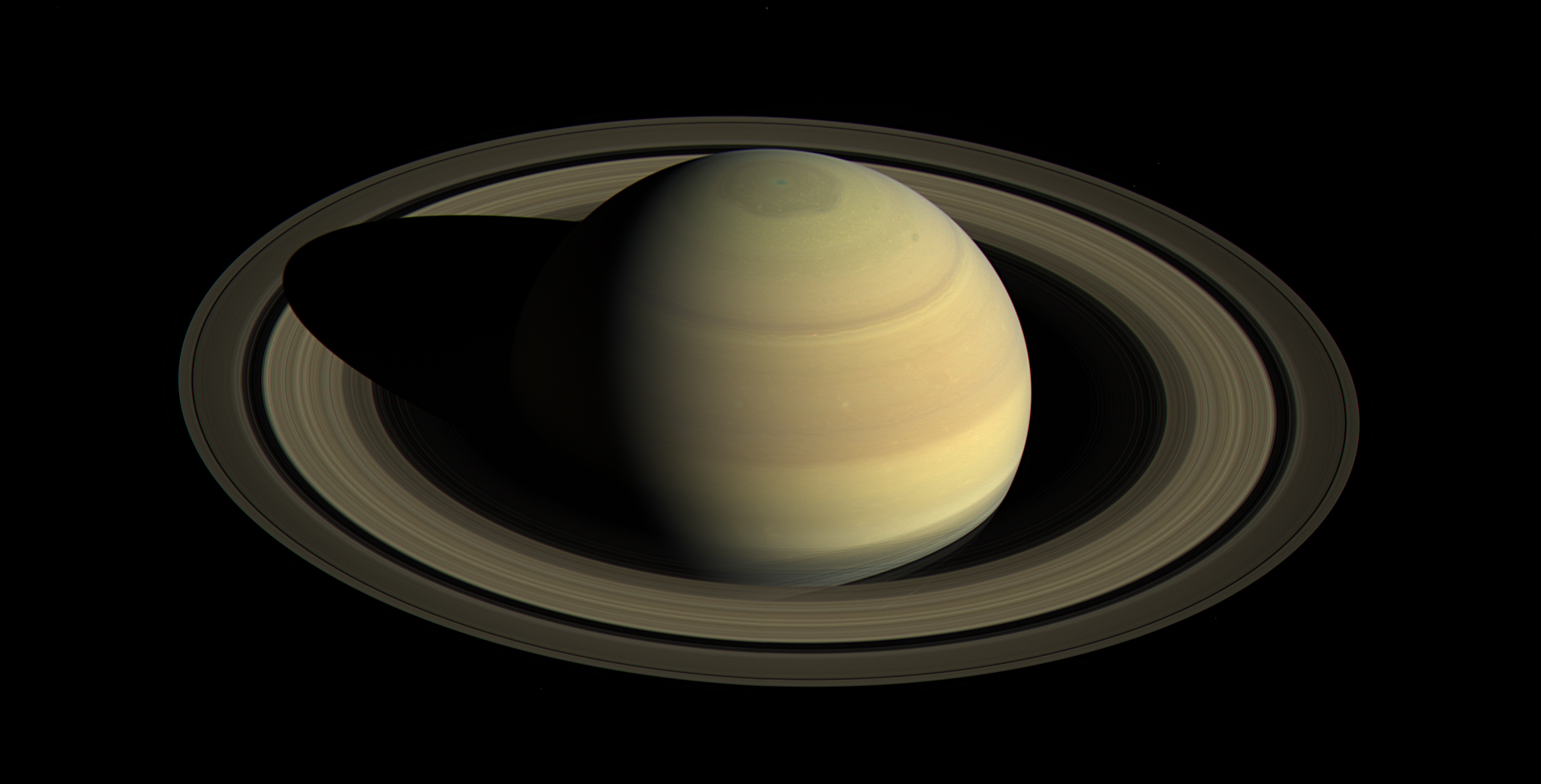
Saturn by Cassini, 2016

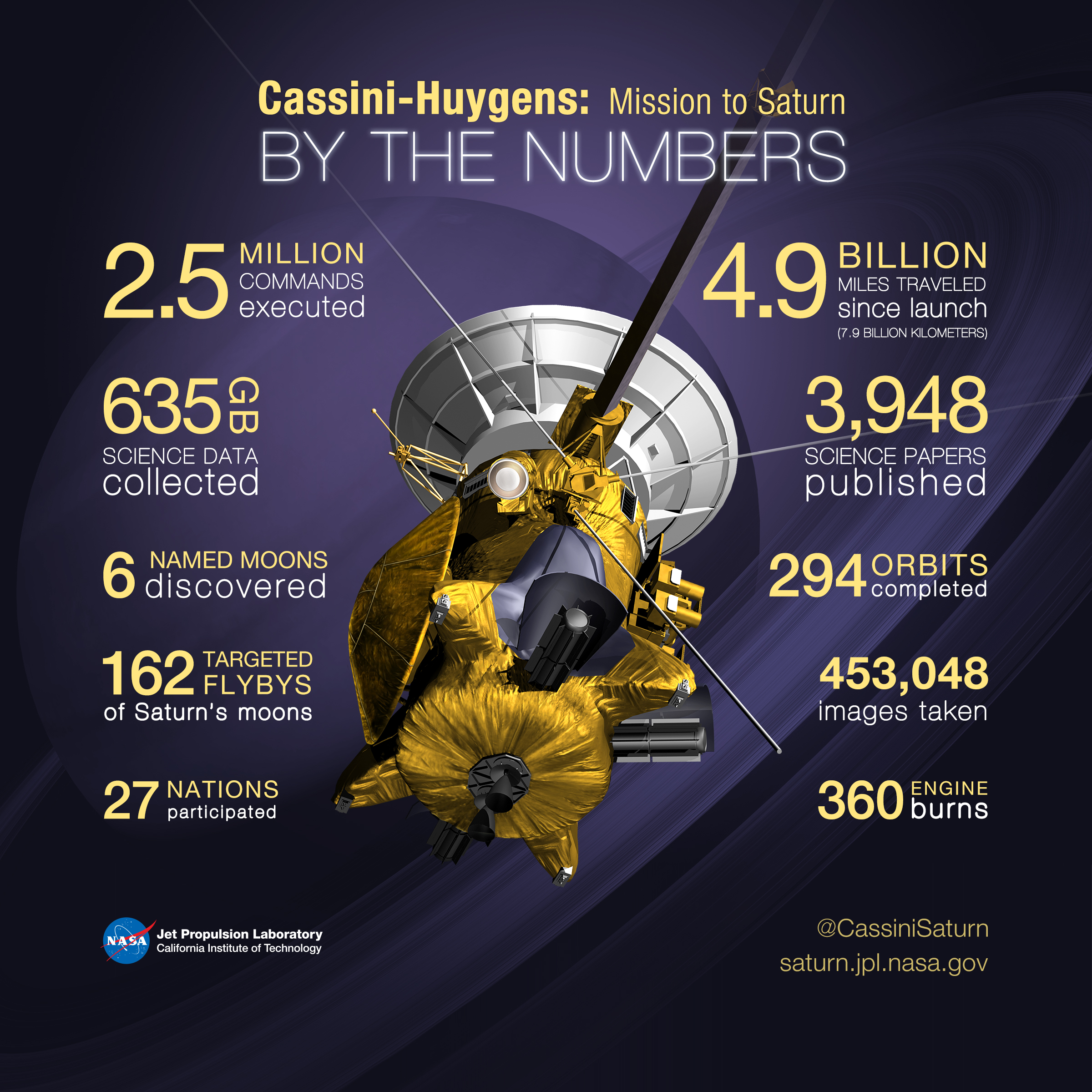
Cassini–Huygens by the numbers
(September 2017)

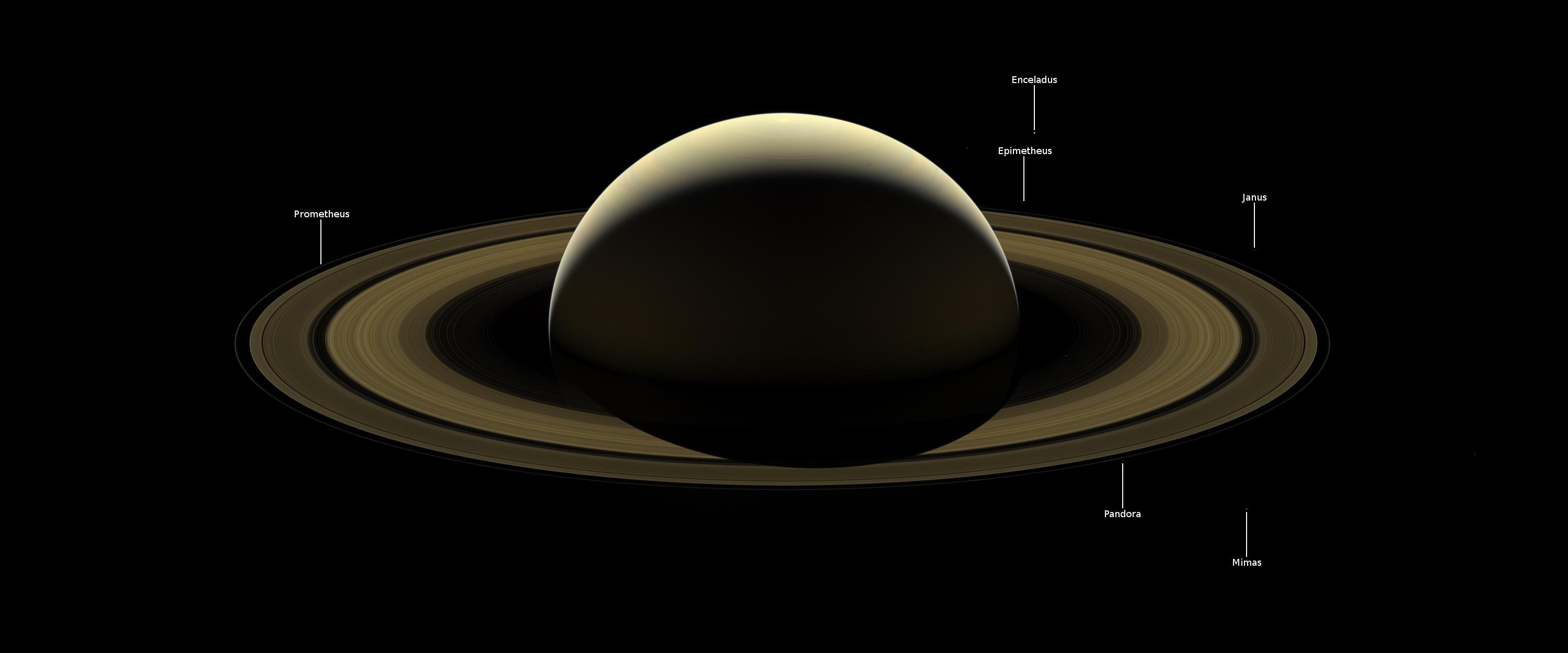
Farewell to Saturn and moons (Enceladus, Epimetheus, Janus, Mimas, Pandora and Prometheus)
(September 13, 2017)

== Glossary ==
- AACS: Attitude and Articulation Control Subsystem
- ACS: Attitude Control Subsystem
- AFC: AACS Flight Computer
- ARWM: Articulated Reaction Wheel Mechanism
- ASI: Agenzia Spaziale Italiana, the Italian space agency
- BIU: Bus Interface Unit
- BOL: Beginning of Life
- CAM: Command Approval Meeting
- CDS: Command and Data Subsystem—Cassini computer that commands and collects data from the instruments
- CICLOPS: Cassini Imaging Central Laboratory for Operations Archived May 1, 2008, at the Wayback Machine
- CIMS: Cassini Information Management System
- CIRS: Composite Infrared Spectrometer
- DCSS: Descent Control Subsystem
- DSCC: Deep Space Communications Center
- DSN: Deep Space Network (large antennas around the Earth)
- DTSTART: Dead Time Start
- ELS: Electron Spectrometer (part of CAPS instrument)
- EOM: End of Mission
- ERT: Earth-received time, UTC of an event
- ESA: European Space Agency
- ESOC: European Space Operations Centre
- FSW: flight software
- HGA: High Gain Antenna
- HMCS: Huygens Monitoring and Control System
- HPOC: Huygens Probe Operations Center
- IBS: Ion Beam Spectrometer (part of CAPS instrument)
- IEB: Instrument Expanded Blocks (instrument command sequences)
- IMS: Ion Mass Spectrometer (part of CAPS instrument)
- ITL: Integrated Test Laboratory—spacecraft simulator
- IVP: Inertial Vector Propagator
- LGA: Low Gain Antenna
- NAC: Narrow Angle Camera
- NASA: National Aeronautics and Space Administration, the United States space agency
- OTM: Orbit Trim Maneuver
- PDRS: Probe Data Relay Subsystem
- PHSS: Probe Harness SubSystem
- POSW: Probe On-Board Software
- PPS: Power and Pyrotechnic Subsystem
- PRA: Probe Relay Antenna
- PSA: Probe Support Avionics
- PSIV: Preliminary Sequence Integration and Validation
- PSE: probe support equipment
- RCS: Reaction Control System
- RFS: Radio Frequency Subsystem
- RPX: ring plane crossing
- RWA: Reaction Wheel Assembly
- SCET: Spacecraft Event Time
- SCR: sequence change requests
- SKR: Saturn Kilometric Radiation
- SOI: Saturn Orbit Insertion (July 1, 2004)
- SOP: Science Operations Plan
- SSPS: Solid State Power Switch
- SSR: Solid State Recorder
- SSUP: Science and Sequence Update Process
- TLA: Thermal Louver Assemblies
- USO: UltraStable Oscillator
- VRHU: Variable Radioisotope Heater Units
- WAC: Wide Angle Camera
- XXM: Extended-Extended Mission

== See also ==
- Europlanet, data network
- Galileo, Jupiter orbiter and entry probe (1989–2003)
- In Saturn's Rings
- List of missions to the outer planets
- Planetary Science Decadal Survey
- Timeline of Cassini–Huygens
