= Cassini retirement =

Retirement of NASA's Cassini spacecraft on 15 September 2017

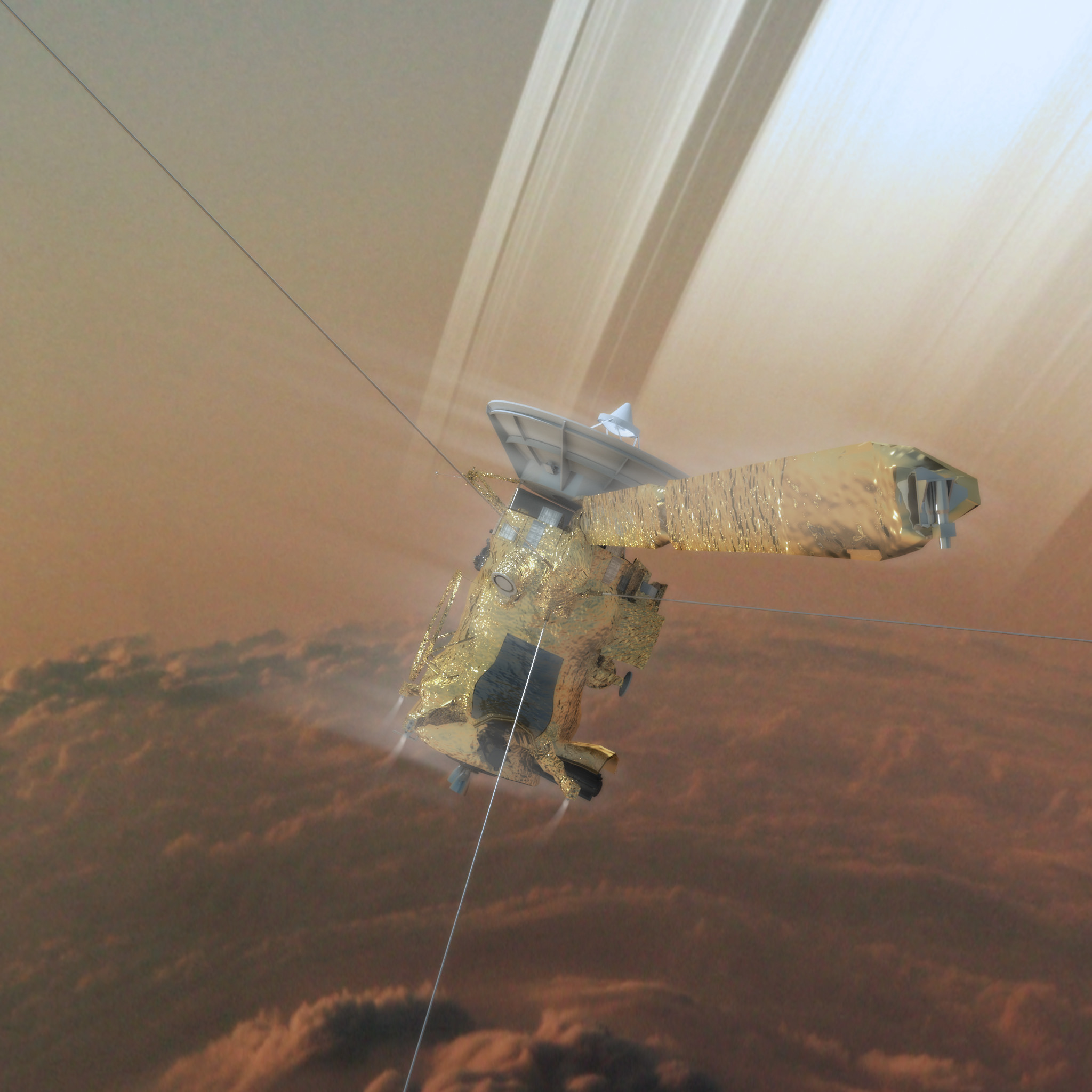
Artist's concept of Cassini's controlled atmospheric entry into Saturn

The Cassini space probe was deliberately disposed of via a controlled fall into Saturn's atmosphere on September 15, 2017, ending its nearly two-decade-long mission. This method was chosen to prevent biological contamination of any of the moons of Saturn now thought to offer potentially habitable environments. Factors that influenced the mission end method included the amount of rocket fuel left, 33 kg (73 lb) of plutonium-238, the health of the spacecraft, and funding for operations on Earth.

Some possibilities for Cassini's later stages were aerobraking into orbit around Titan, leaving the Saturn system, or making close approaches and/or changing its orbit. For example, it could have collected solar wind data in a heliocentric orbit.

== End of mission options ==
Color	Meaning
Red	Poor
Orange	Fair
Yellow	Good
Green	Excellent

During planning for its extended missions, various future plans for Cassini were evaluated on the basis of scientific value, cost, and time. Some of the options examined included collision with Saturn atmosphere, an icy satellite, or rings; another was departure from Saturn orbit to Jupiter, Uranus, Neptune, or a centaur. Other options included leaving it in certain stable orbits around Saturn, or departure to a heliocentric orbit. Each plan required certain amounts of time and changes in velocity. Another possibility was aerobraking into orbit around Titan.

This table is based on page 19 of Cassini Extended Missions (NASA), from 2008.

Cassini end of mission options with science evaluation circa 2008
Type	Option	Set-up requirements	Execution time	Operability and assurance of end-of-life	Velocity change (Δv) required	Science evaluation (circa 2008)
Impact with ...	Saturn's surface: short-period orbits	High inclination achievable via any XXM design	2–10 months total	Short time between last encounter and impact	5–30 m/s	D-ring option satisfies unachieved original mission goals; cheap and easily achievable
Impact with ...	Saturn's surface: long-period orbits	Specific orientation and inclination required	4–22 months to set up long-period orbit + 3 years for final orbit	3 years between last encounter and impact	5–35 m/s	Operations costs required for 3 years with no science [that] could be applied elsewhere
Impact with ...	icy satellite	Can be implemented from any geometry	0.5–3 months total	Short time between last encounter and impact	5–15 m/s	Cheap and achievable anywhere/time
Impact with ...	main rings	Can be implemented from any geometry	0.5–3 months total	Short time between last encounter and impact, but difficult to prove spacecraft destruction	5–15 m/s	Cheap and achievable anywhere/time; close-in science before impact
Escape to ...	giant planet	Specific orbit period, orientation and inclination required + specific departure dates	1.4–2.4 years to escape + long transfer time: Jupiter 12, Uranus 20, Neptune 40 years	Planetary impact can only be guaranteed shortly after escape for Jupiter	5–35 m/s	Giant-planet science unlikely
Escape to ...	heliocentric orbit	Can be implemented from any geometry	9–18 months to escape, open-ended Solar orbit	Last encounter goes to escape	5–30 m/s	Solar wind data only
Escape to ...	Centaur	Large target set offers wide range of departures	1–2 years to escape + >3-year transfer	Last encounter goes to escape; must maintain teams for >3 years for Centaur science	5–30 m/s	Multi-year lifetime and funding seems better spent in target-rich Saturnian environment
Stable orbit outside ...	Titan	Specific orientation and orbit period required	13–24 months + open-ended time in stable orbit	200 days between last encounter and final orbit	50 m/s	Limited Saturn/magnetospheric science, but for long period of time
Stable orbit outside ...	Phoebe	Specific orientation and orbit period required	>8 years + open-ended time in stable orbit	Many months between last encounter and final orbit	120 m/s	Solar wind data; very rare passages through magnetotail

== Atmospheric entry and destruction ==
Animation of Cassini's Grand Finale Cassini · Saturn

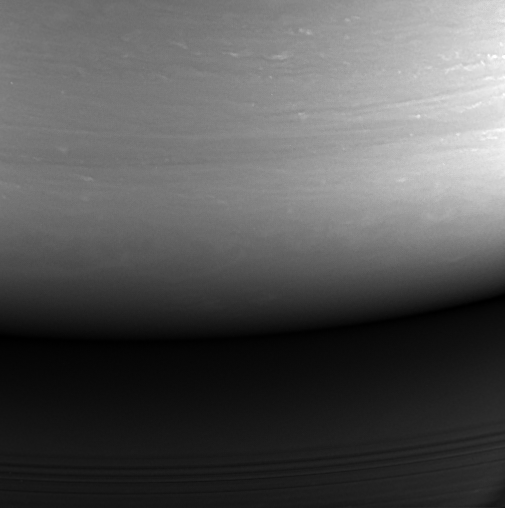
Last image taken by Cassini, at 19:59 UTC (14 September 2017).

On July 4, 2014, the Cassini science team announced that the proximal orbits of the probe would be named the "Grand Finale". This would be immediately preceded by a gradual shift in inclination to better view Saturn's polar hexagon, and a flyby of Enceladus to more closely study its cryovolcanism. This was followed by a dive into Saturn's atmosphere.

There was budgetary drama in 2013–14 about NASA receiving U.S. government funding for the Grand Finale. The two phases of the Grand Finale ended up being the equivalent of having two separate Discovery Program-class missions in that the Grand Finale was completely different from the main Cassini regular mission. The U.S. government in late 2014 approved the Grand Finale at the cost of $200 million. This was far cheaper than building two new probes in separate Discovery-class missions.

Scientific data was collected using eight of its twelve science instruments. All of the probe's magnetosphere and plasma science instruments, plus the spacecraft's radio science system, and its infrared and ultraviolet spectrometers collected data during the final plunge. The data rates flowing back from Saturn could not support imaging during the final plunge, so all pictures were downlinked (transmitted back to Earth) and cameras were switched off, before the final plunge began. The predicted altitude for loss of signal was approximately 1,500 km (930 mi) above Saturn's cloud tops, when the spacecraft began to tumble and burn up like a meteor.

Cassini's final transmissions were received by the Canberra Deep Space Communication Complex, located in Australia at 18:55:46 AEST. In a bittersweet ending for the scientists involved, some of whom had been involved in the mission for decades, data was received for 30 seconds longer than anticipated, and the spacecraft's ultimate demise was predicted to have occurred within 45 seconds after that. Homages were paid on social media. NASA's video won an Emmy for "Outstanding Original Interactive Program".

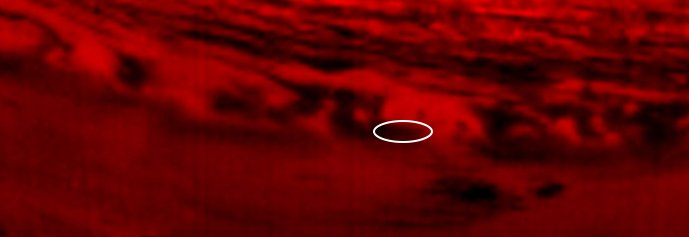
Cassini impact site on Saturn (visual/IR mapping spectrometer; September 15, 2017)

== See also ==
- Deliberate crash landings on extraterrestrial bodies
- Timeline of Cassini–Huygens
