= Spacecraft retirement =

Discontinuation of a space probe from active service

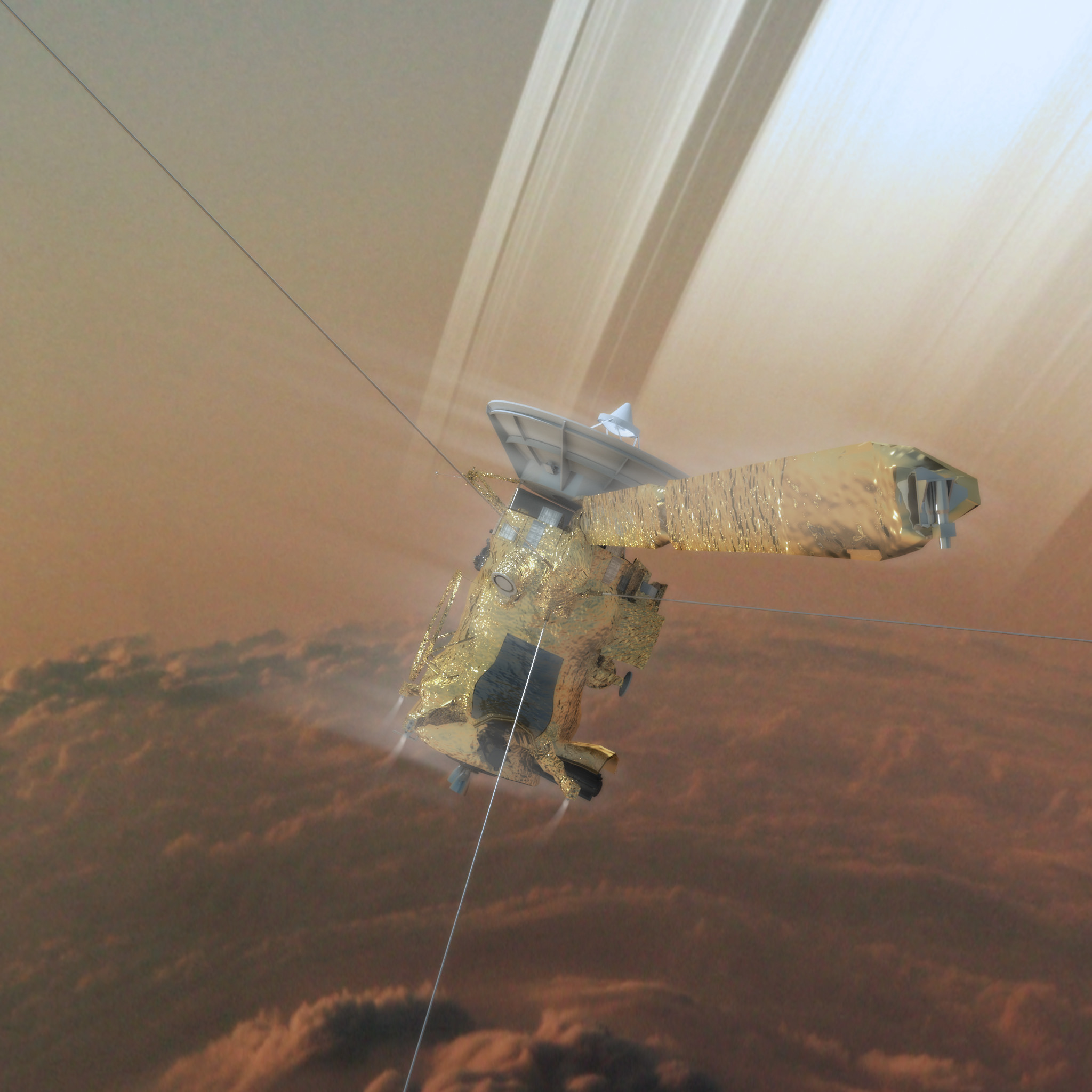
Most notable example of spacecraft retirement is the retirement of the Cassini-Huygens probe in 2017.

The retirement of a spacecraft refers to the discontinuation of a spacecraft from active service. This can involve deorbiting the spacecraft, discontinuing the probes operations, passivating, or loss of contact with it. One notable example of spacecraft retirement is Cassini's retirement in 2017.

== History ==
The first spacecraft to be retired was the Soviet Union's Sputnik 1 probe. Launched in 1957, Sputnik 1 completed its mission when it naturally deorbited due to atmospheric drag after approximately three months in orbit, completing a total of 1,440 orbits around Earth.

In 1958, NASA launched the Vanguard 1 probe as part of its efforts in the Space Race. Six years later, NASA officially concluded the mission as the probe had fulfilled all its experimental and objective requirements. Initially, NASA estimated that Vanguard 1 would remain in low Earth orbit for up to 2,000 years. However, due to solar radiation pressure and atmospheric drag, this estimate has been revised. Vanguard 1 is now expected to re-enter Earth's atmosphere and burn up in approximately 240 years.

Following the discontinuation of the Vanguard 1 probe, many space agencies and subsequent spacecraft have ceased operations through various methods.

In 2017, the Cassini–Huygens probe concluded its 19-year exploration mission by descending into Saturn's atmosphere. The decision to end the mission was prompted by the minimal power supply remaining in the probe's radioisotope thermoelectric generators (RTGs). The maneuver began on November 29, 2016, when Cassini performed a flyby of Saturn's moon Titan, positioning it into the orbital plane of Saturn's F Ring for its grand finale. Cassini conducted another flyby of Titan on April 22, 2017, positioning the probe to pass within a precise 3,100 km (1,900 mi) of Saturn's clouds. This maneuver was repeated 22 times until September 15, 2017, at 11:55:46 UTC, when communication with Cassini's high-gain antenna was lost during the final flyby of Saturn. Cassini's grand finale represented the first intentional entry of a spacecraft into the atmosphere of a gas giant and marked the first major spacecraft to burn up in such an atmosphere. The mission's success has significantly influenced the planning and execution of both current and future missions focused on gas and ice giants.

In the beginning of the 21st century retirement is not yet a routine end-of-mission process for the geostationary satellites.

== Reasons ==
=== Exhaustion of propellant ===
The satellites expend their propellant for the orbital station-keeping and eventually run out of it. For the high-value satellites in the geostationary orbit, the amount of the onboard propellant is usually the limiting factor of their service life (12-15 years at the beginning of the 21st century).

=== Power decrement ===
Many modern spacecraft utilize radioisotope thermoelectric generators (RTGs), and spacecraft electric propulsion as their power source. Over time, the power output of RTGs or SEPs diminishes due to the gradual depletion of the radioactive isotopes they rely on for electricity generation.

Radioisotope thermoelectric generators convert the heat generated by the decay of radioactive isotopes into electricity. As the radioactive isotopes decay over time, the power output of the RTGs gradually decreases. It's estimated that the power output from the RTGs will fall below the threshold required to operate the spacecraft's systems effectively, including communication with Earth and scientific instruments. As a result, spacecraft equipped with RTGs will eventually have insufficient power to run their instruments.

Spacecraft electric propulsion systems utilize electric fields to accelerate charged ions to high velocities, generating thrust for propulsion. Unlike chemical propulsion systems, which rely on the combustion of propellant, electric propulsion systems ionize propellant using electrical energy and then accelerate the resulting ions to produce thrust. As the ions are expelled from the spacecraft at high speeds, they create thrust in the opposite direction, enabling spacecraft maneuverability. Electric propulsion systems offer high efficiency and long-duration capabilities, making them suitable for precise trajectory adjustments, extended deep space missions, and potential future crewed missions. These systems rely on electrical energy for ionization and acceleration of propellant, typically supplied by onboard power sources such as solar panels or batteries. However, over time, these energy sources may become depleted, particularly in missions with extended durations or in environments with limited sunlight. Additionally, the components of SEP systems, including power electronics and ionization chambers, may degrade due to exposure to space conditions, leading to decreased efficiency and power output. Some SEP systems have a limited supply of propellant, such as xenon gas, which can be exhausted over the course of a mission, rendering the system unable to generate thrust. The end of a spacecraft's mission or operational life may also result in the cessation of power generation by the SEP system, marking the conclusion of its propulsion capabilities.

=== Degradation of instruments ===
Spacecraft instruments are susceptible to various external factors, including solar wind and other space phenomena. Solar wind, consisting of charged particles emitted by the Sun, can disrupt sensitive instruments like magnetometers and particle detectors, potentially reducing sensitivity or causing complete loss of functionality. Other space phenomena, such as cosmic rays and micrometeoroid impacts, also pose risks, potentially damaging spacecraft components and degrading instrument performance over time. Additionally, temperature extremes and outgassing of materials in space can further impact instrument functionality.

=== Loss of contact ===
Communication loss between spacecraft and Earth is a known occurrence, particularly as spacecraft travel deeper into space. Factors like distance, technical malfunctions, or power source depletion can all contribute to this loss. Efforts may be made to re-establish communication, but success isn't guaranteed due to technological limitations or the spacecraft's condition.

Pioneer 10 and Pioneer 11 serve as examples of spacecraft encountering communication failures with Earth. As these probes traveled deeper into space, the distance between them and Earth grew, posing challenges for maintaining contact. Ultimately, their antennas dropped below Earth's radio detection threshold, leading to the loss of communication.

== Methods ==
=== Deorbitation ===
When spacecraft lose funding or complete their scientific objectives, they may alter their trajectories. One common approach is to redirect the spacecraft towards a path where it will burn up in the atmosphere of the celestial body they were orbiting. This intentional reentry minimizes the risk of the spacecraft becoming space debris, or helps the contamination of planets or moons.

=== Mission completion ===
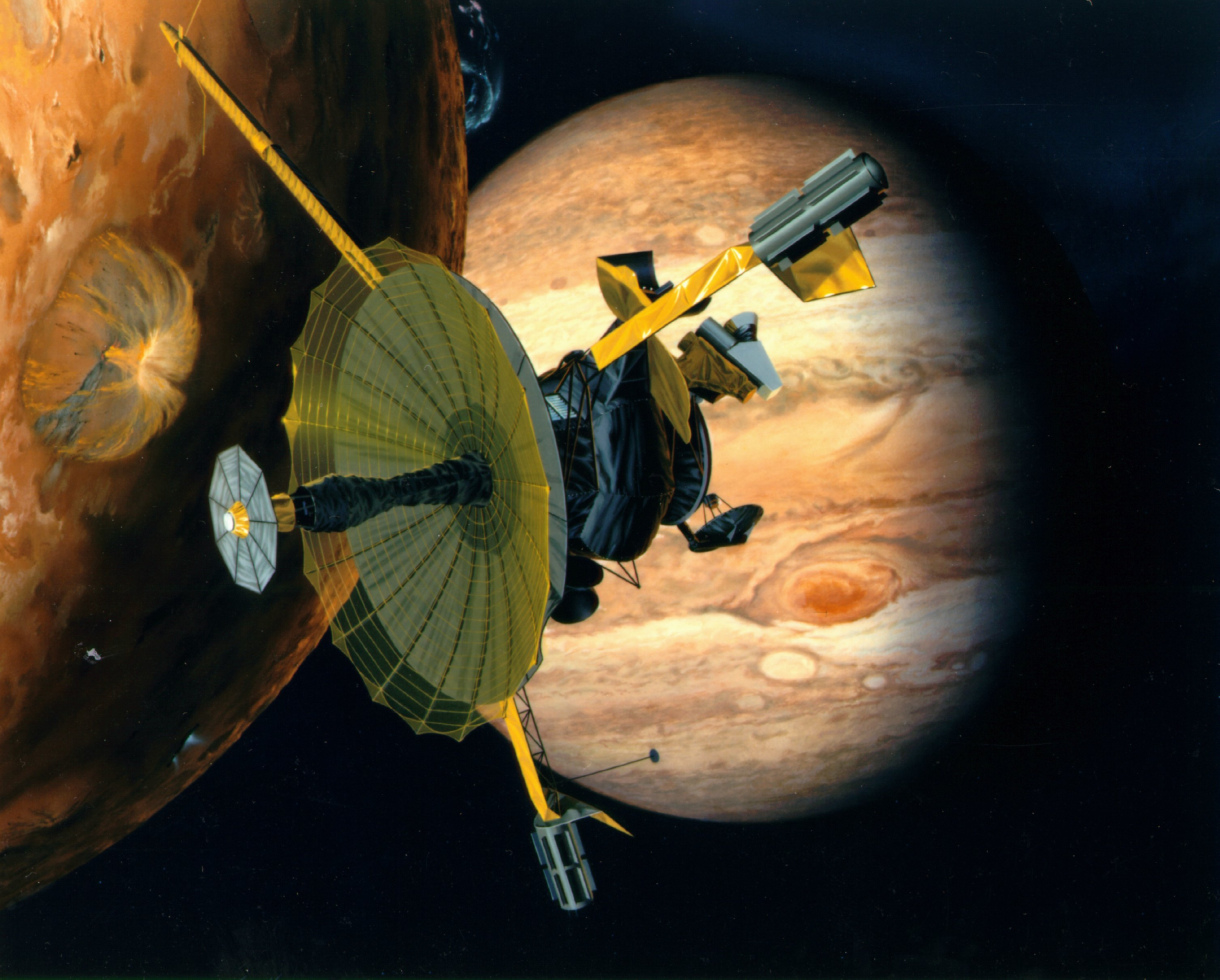
A photo of Galileo passing by Jupiters moon Io. Galileo was one of the many probes retired to suppress bacterial contamination of Jupiters moons by burning up in Jupiters atmosphere

Some spacecraft are retired upon completing their scientific objectives. Depending on the mission's requirements and circumstances, various retirement strategies may be employed. For example, spacecraft can be intentionally deorbited, left in orbit around a planet or moon with the risk of contamination, or the creation of space debris which could contribute to the accumulation of space debris, posing hazards to other spacecraft and future missions.

=== Long-term orbital stability ===
For a satellite in the geostationary orbit (GEO) a more economically feasible way of disposal is raising the orbit by a few hundred of kilometers and shutting down its transmitter. This will prevent the retired satellite from interfering with other GEO satellites. United Nations and the United States Federal Communications Commission independently have policies in place requiring an increase in altitude of at least 300 kilometers. This requires the reserve of propellant that otherwise could be used for station-keeping during about 6 months of additional service life. High economic value of the GEO satellites prompts researchers to evaluate the use of a space tug for the final change of orbit.

Under certain circumstances, scientists can adjust a spacecraft's orbit to ensure it remains at a safe distance from the celestial body it's orbiting. This adjustment can prolong the spacecraft's orbital stability for hundreds of thousands to millions of years, mitigating the effects of planetary gravity, atmospheric drag, or solar radiation pressure. One notable example is NASA's Laser Geodynamics Satellite (LAGEOS), launched in May 1976. LAGEOS carries a time capsule, created by Carl Sagan, intended to burn up in Earth's atmosphere approximately 8.4 million years from now.

== See also ==
- Space debris
- Spacecraft cemetery
- Graveyard orbit
- Planetary protection
- List of Solar System probes

== Sources ==
- Brealey, Carissa; Harris, Ian; Lujan, Brandon; Montoro, Manuel; Williams, Thomas; Zuby, John (2021). Extending the Life of NASA's Tracking and Data Relay Satellite (TDRS)-8: TDRS-8 Power Challenges And Planning for End of Mission (PDF). 16th International Conference on Space Operations - SpaceOps 2021.
- Cohen, Nicholas; Richardson, Gregory; Martinelli, Scott; Betser, Joseph (2011-06-14). Extending Satellite Lifetimes in Geosynchronous Orbit with Servicing. Reston, Virginia: American Institute of Aeronautics and Astronautics. doi:10.2514/6.2011-7302.
- Elbert, B.R. (2008). Introduction to Satellite Communication. Artech House space applications series. Artech House. ISBN 978-1-59693-211-1.
- Galabova, Kalina K.; de Weck, Olivier L. (2006). "Economic case for the retirement of geosynchronous communication satellites via space tugs". Acta Astronautica. 58 (9). Elsevier BV: 485–498. doi:10.1016/j.actaastro.2005.12.014. ISSN 0094-5765.
