= Timeline of Cassini–Huygens =

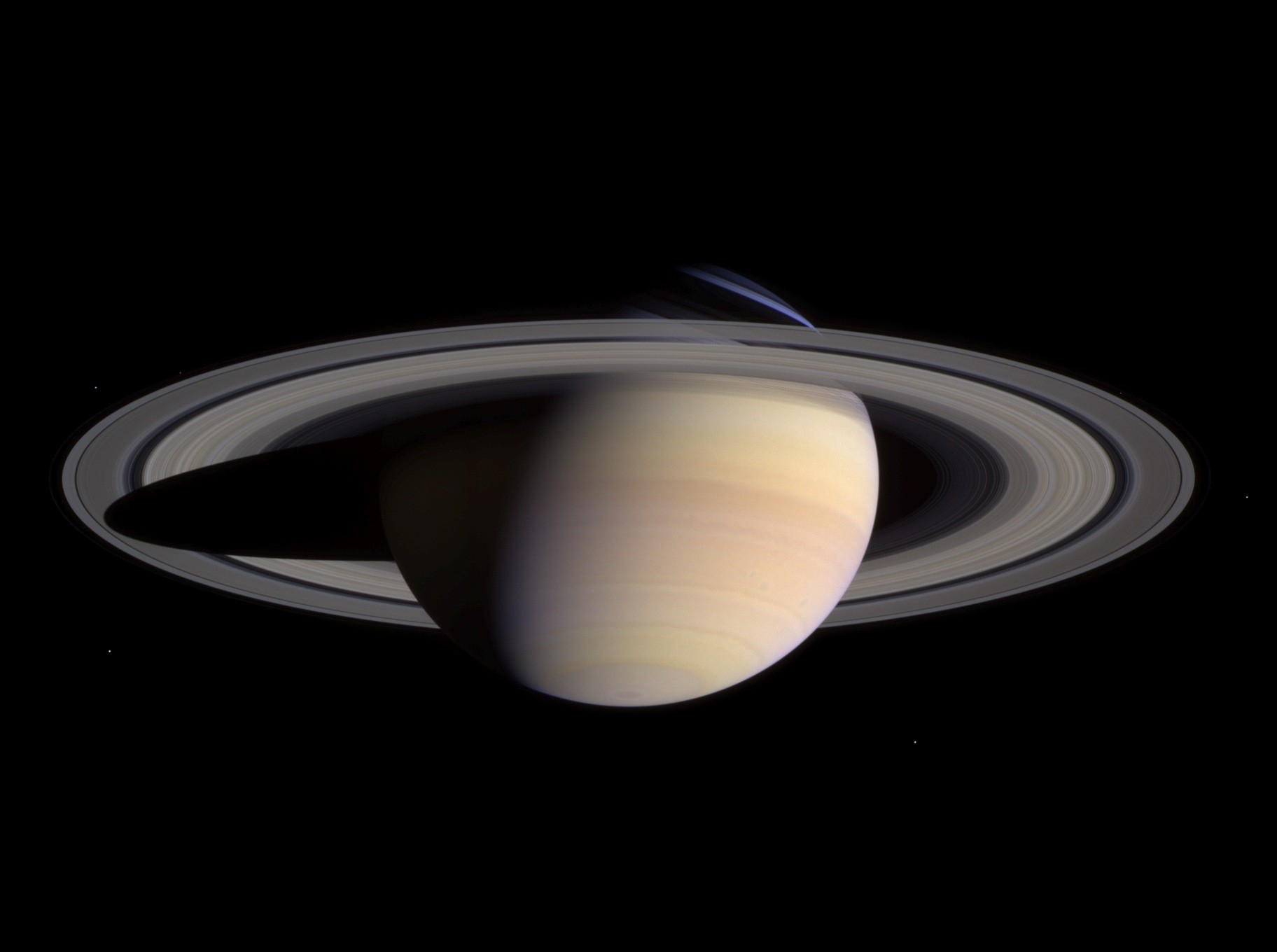
View of Saturn from Cassini, taken in March 2004, shortly before the spacecraft's orbital insertion in July 2004.

This article provides a timeline of the Cassini–Huygens mission (commonly called Cassini). Cassini was a collaboration between the United States' NASA, the European Space Agency ("ESA"), and the Italian Space Agency ("ASI") to send a probe to study the Saturnian system, including the planet, its rings, and its natural satellites. The Flagship-class uncrewed robotic spacecraft comprised both NASA's Cassini probe, and ESA's Huygens lander which was designed to land on Saturn's largest moon, Titan. Cassini was the fourth space probe to visit Saturn and the first to enter its orbit. The craft were named after astronomers Giovanni Cassini and Christiaan Huygens.

Launched aboard a Titan IVB/Centaur on 15 October 1997, Cassini had a nearly 20-year life span, with 13 of these years spent orbiting Saturn. The voyage to Saturn included flybys of Venus (April 1998 and June 1999), Earth (August 1999), the asteroid 2685 Masursky, and Jupiter (December 2000). The probes entered orbit on 1 July 2004, and the mission ended on 15 September 2017, when Cassini flew into Saturn's upper atmosphere in order to prevent any risk of contaminating Saturn's moons, some of which have active environments that could potentially bear life. The mission is widely perceived to have succeeded beyond expectations. Cassini-Huygens has been described by NASA's Planetary Science Division Director as a "mission of firsts", that has revolutionized human understanding of the Saturnian system, including its moons and rings, and our understanding of where life might be found in the Solar System.

Cassini's primary mission lasted for four years, from June 2004 to May 2008. The mission was extended for another two years until September 2010, under the name of Cassini Equinox Mission. The mission was extended a second and final time with the Cassini Solstice Mission, lasting until the spacecraft's destruction in September 2017.

The Huygens module traveled with Cassini until its separation from the probe on 25 December 2004; it was successfully landed by parachute on Titan on 14 January 2005. It successfully returned data to Earth for around 90 minutes, using the orbiter as a relay. This was the first landing ever accomplished in the outer Solar System and the first landing on a moon other than our own.

At the end of its mission, the Cassini spacecraft executed the "Grand Finale" of its mission: several risky passes through the gaps between Saturn and Saturn's inner rings. The purpose of this phase was to maximize Cassini's scientific outcome before the spacecraft was destroyed. The atmospheric entry of Cassini effectively ended the mission, although data analysis and production is still ongoing.

== Launch and cruise phase (1997–2003) ==
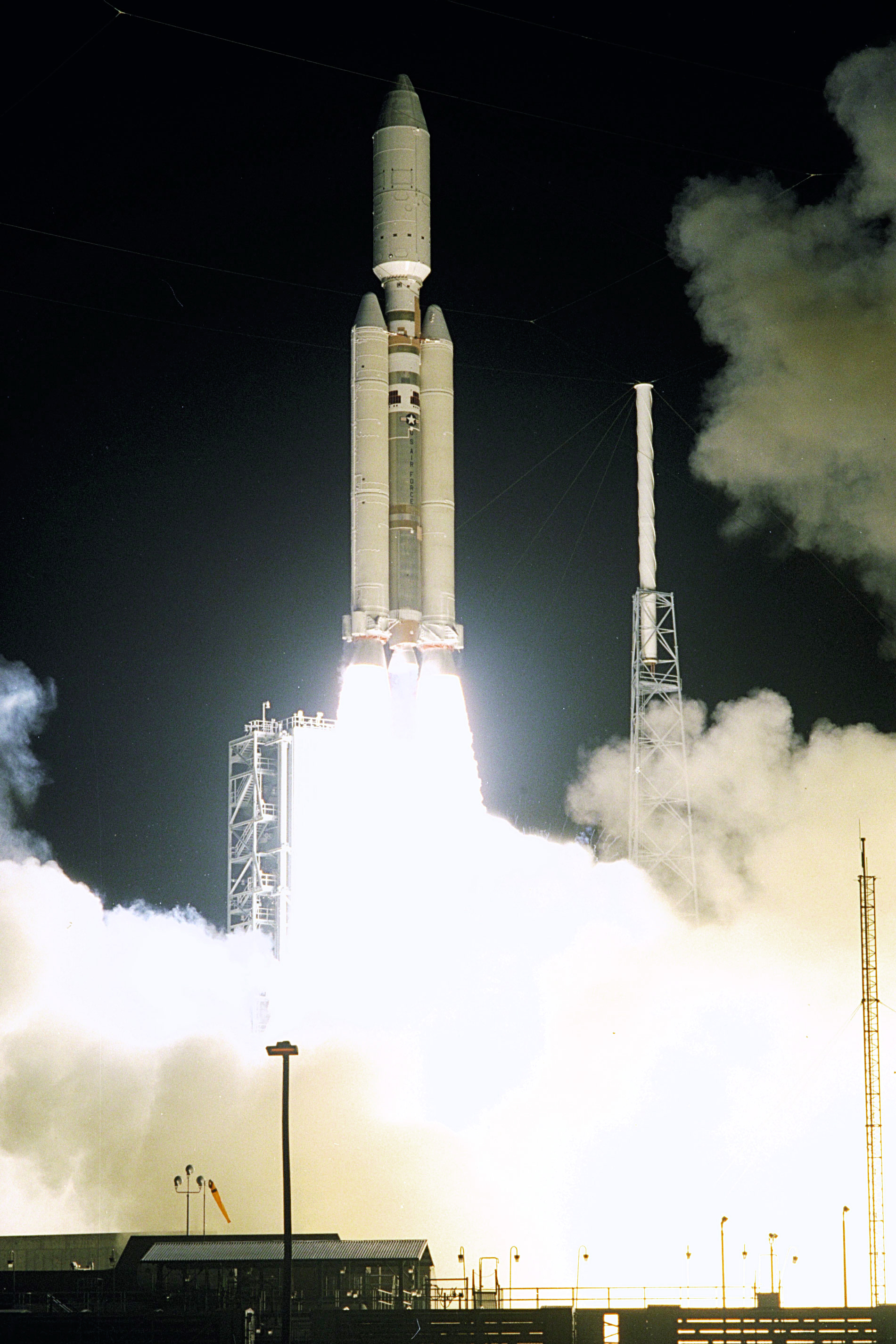
Launch occurred at 4:43 a.m. EDT (8:43 UTC) on 15 October 1997, from Space Launch Complex 40 at Cape Canaveral Air Force Station, Florida.

Animation of Cassini trajectory from 15 October 1997 to 4 May 2008 Cassini–Huygens Jupiter Saturn Earth Venus Sun · 2685 Masursky

The initial gravitational-assist trajectory of Cassini–Huygens

15 October 1997 01:43 Pacific Daylight Time (PDT) – Cassini launched at 08:43 UTC inside Titan IVB/Centaur rocket at Cape Canaveral.

26 April 1998 06:52 PDT – Gravity-assisted flyby of Venus at 284 km, receiving a boost in speed of about 7 kilometers per second.

3 December 1998 22:06 PST – Cassini fired its main rocket engine for 90 minutes, setting the spacecraft on course for its second Venus flyby in 1999. The engine burn slowed the spacecraft by close to 450 meters per second (about 1,006 miles per hour) relative to the Sun. Cassini's speed went from 67,860 kilometers per hour (42,168 miles per hour) at the start of the maneuver to 66,240 kilometers per hour (41,161 miles per hour) at the end of the engine firing.

24 June 1999 13:30 PDT – Gravity-assisted flyby of Venus at 623 km.

18 August 1999 03:28 UTC − Gravity-assisted flyby of Earth. An hour 20 minutes before closest approach, Cassini made the closest approach to the Moon at 377,000 km, and took a series of calibration images. The spacecraft flew past Earth at a distance of 1,171 kilometers (728 mi), passing most closely above the eastern South Pacific at 23.5°S 128.5°W. Cassini received a 5.5-kilometer-per-second (about 12,000-mile-per-hour) boost in velocity.

23 January 2000 – flyby of Asteroid 2685 Masursky around 10:00 UTC. Cassini took images 5 to 7 hours before at 1.6 million km distance and estimated a diameter of 15 to 20 km.

30 December 2000 10:05 UTC − Gravity-assisted flyby of Jupiter. Cassini was at its closest point (9.7 million kilometres, 137 Jovian radii) to Jupiter at this date, and performed many scientific measurements. It also produced the most detailed global color portrait of Jupiter ever produced (seen on the right); the smallest visible features are approximately 60 km (37 mi) across.

30 May 2001 – During the coast phase between Jupiter and Saturn, it was noticed that "haze" became visible in the pictures taken by the narrow-angle camera of Cassini. This was first seen when a picture of the star Maia in the Pleiades was taken after a routine heating period.

23 July 2002 – In late January, a test was performed to remove the "haze" from the narrow-angle camera lens by heating it. Warming the camera to 4 degrees Celsius (39 degrees Fahrenheit) for eight days produced positive results. Later, the heating was extended to 60 days, and a picture of the star Spica showed an improvement of more than 90 percent compared to before the heating period. On 9 July, a picture showed that the removal procedure was completed successfully, which was announced on 23 July.

10 October 2003 – The Cassini science team announced the results of a test of Einstein's theory of gravity, using radio signals from the Cassini probe. The researchers observed a frequency shift in the radio waves to and from the space craft, as those signals traveled close to the Sun. Past tests were in agreement with the theoretical predictions with an accuracy of one part in one thousand. The Cassini experiment improved this to about 20 parts in a million, with the data still supporting Einstein's theory.

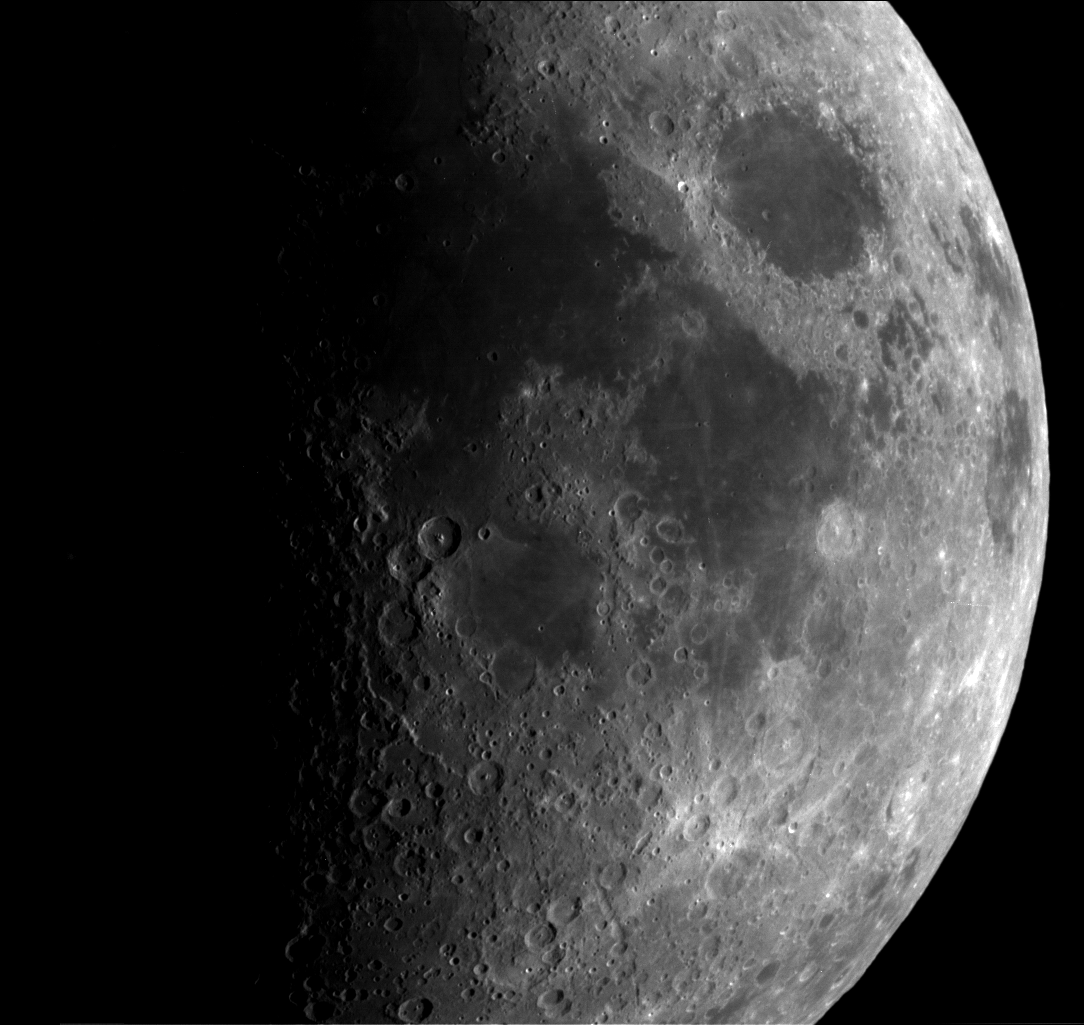
Picture of Moon during flyby

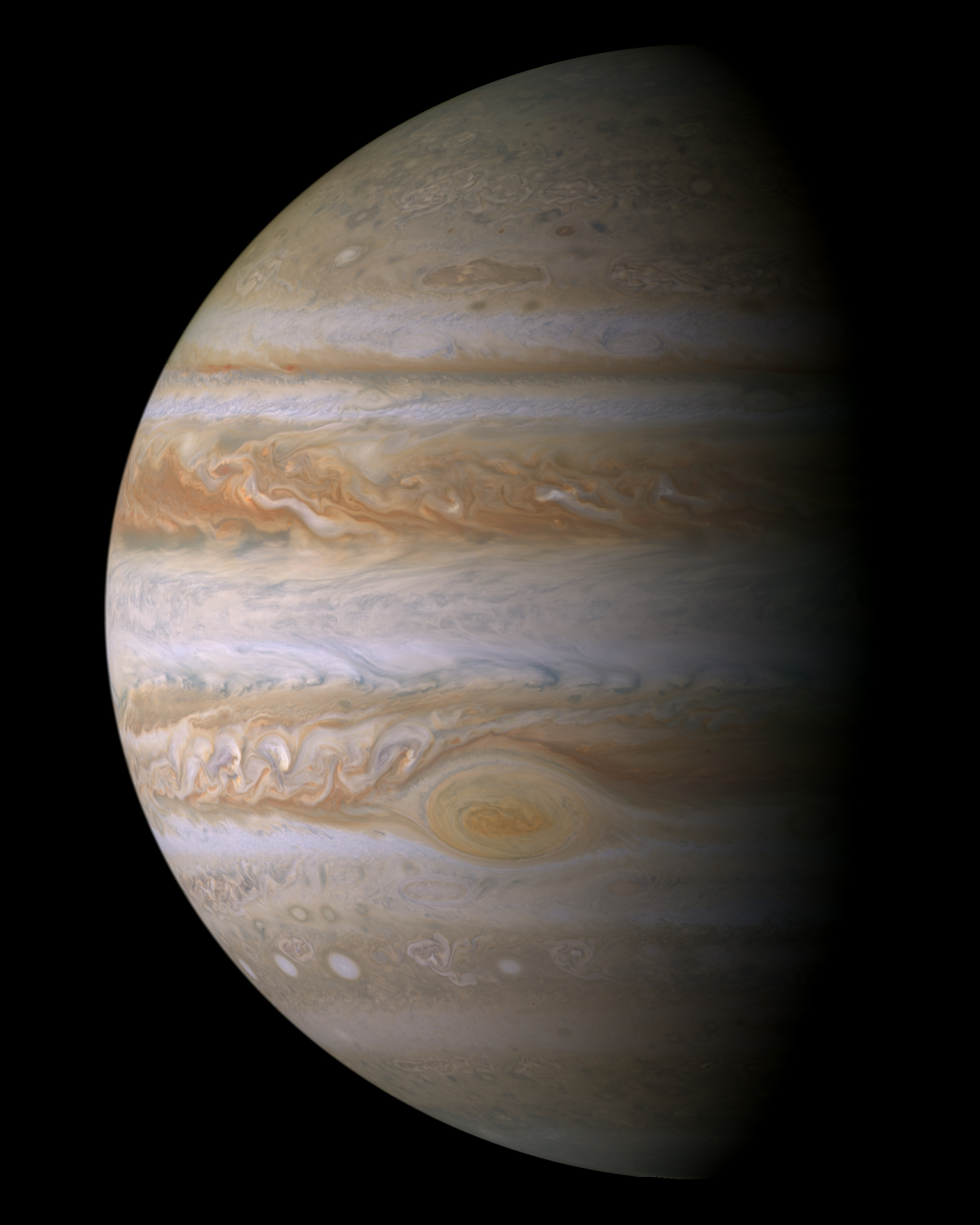
Jupiter flyby

== Primary mission (2004–2008) ==
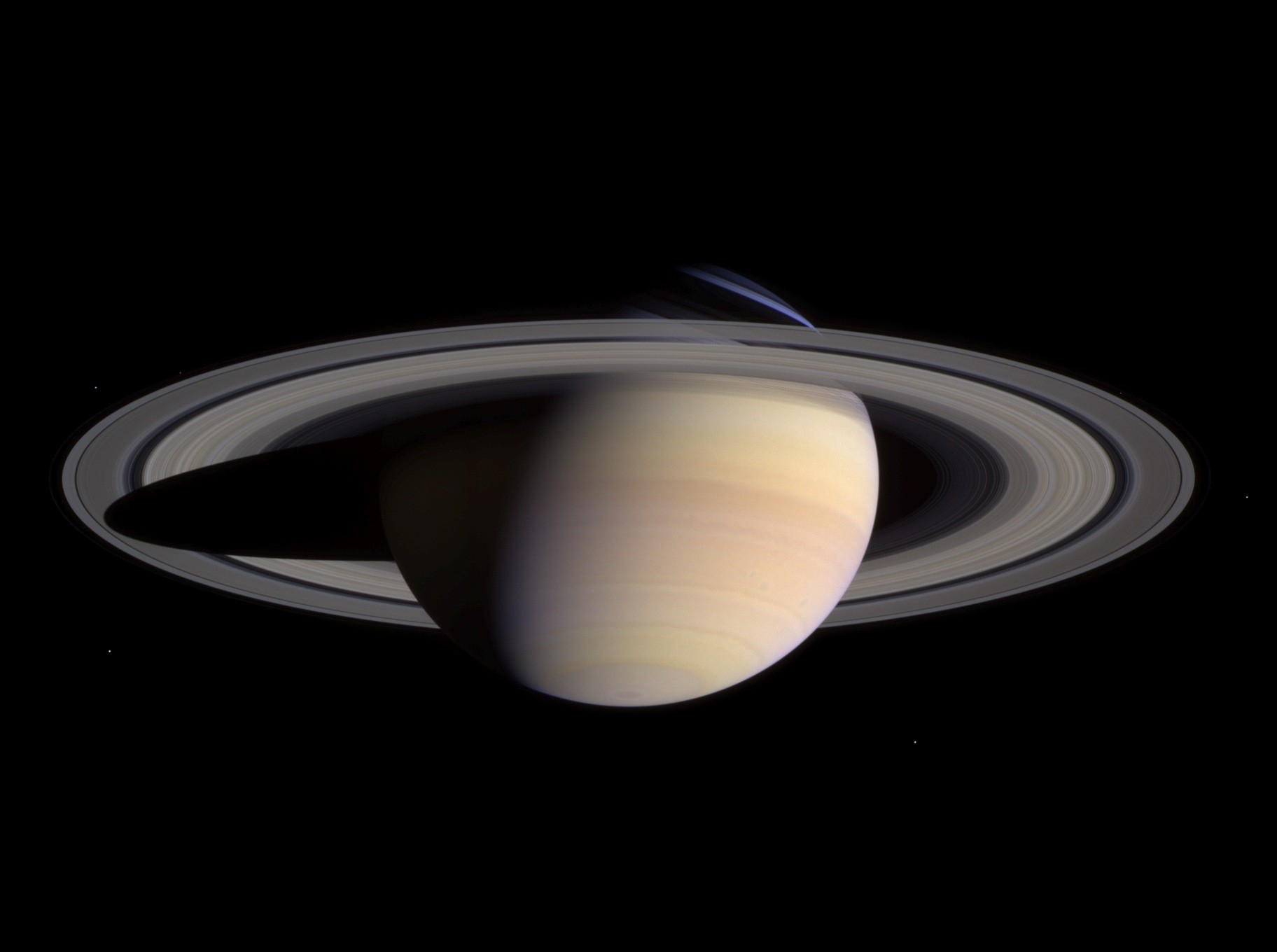
Cassini image of Saturn, February 2004

Animation of Cassini's trajectory around Saturn from 1 May 2004 to 15 September 2017 Cassini · Saturn · Enceladus · Titan · Iapetus

27 February 2004 – A new, high-resolution picture of Saturn taken by Cassini on 9 February was released, and it was noted that mission scientists were puzzled by the fact that no "spokes" in Saturn's ring are visible. These dark structures in the "B" section of the ring had been discovered in pictures taken by the Voyager probes in 1981. Another picture, in infrared light, taken on 16 February shows cloud height differences and the same disturbance visible throughout the 1990s in Hubble Space Telescope images.

12 March 2004 – Pictures taken on 23 February do show a feature discovered by Voyager: Clumps in the outer "F"-ring. What could not be ascertained at the time was the exact lifetime of these clumps, and it is hoped that Cassini will provide conclusive data about this question. The first set of pictures shows a set of "clumps" moving along the "F" ring.

26 March 2004 – The Cassini science team published the first sequence of pictures of Saturn showing clouds moving at high speed around the planet. Using a filter to better see water haze on top of the dense cloud cover, motions in the equatorial and southern regions are clearly visible. The pictures were taken during the days from 15 to 19 February.

8 April 2004 – The first "long-term" observation of cloud dynamics in Saturn's atmosphere were published by mission scientists. A set of pictures shows two storms in the southern latitudes merge during a period from 19 to 20 March. Both storms had a diameter of about 1,000 km (620 mi) before they merged.

15 April 2004 – NASA announced that two moons discovered by Voyager 1 were sighted again by Cassini in pictures taken on 10 March: Prometheus and Pandora. These are no ordinary moons, but their gravitational effects on the "F" ring led scientists to call them "shepherd moons". They fascinate all researchers interested in the dynamics of the ring system, because their orbits are close enough that they interact with each other in a chaotic manner. They have a history of defying predictions of their orbits. One of Cassini's missions will be to monitor the movements of these bodies closely.

18 May 2004 – Cassini entered the Saturn system. The gravitational pull of Saturn began to overtake the influence of the Sun.

20 May 2004 – The first picture of Titan with better resolution than any Earth-based observation was released. It was taken 5 May from a distance of 29.3 million kilometers (18.2 million miles).

27 May 2004 – TCM-20, the Phoebe approach TCM (Trajectory Correction Maneuver) was executed at 22:26:00 UTC. This was a 5-minute and 56 second burn of the main engine, which was not used since December 1998. It therefore doubled as a "dress rehearsal" for the 96 minute burn during "Saturn Orbit Insertion" (SOI). However, TCM-20 was mainly designed to change Cassini's velocity by 34.7 m/s (78 mph), setting up a flyby of the moon Phoebe 11 June.

11 June 2004 – Cassini flew by the moon Phoebe at 19:33 UT in Spacecraft Event Time at 2068 kilometers distance. All of the eleven onboard instruments operated as expected and all data was acquired. Scientists plan to use the data to create global maps of the cratered moon, and to determine Phoebe's composition, mass and density. It took scientists several days to pore over the data to make more concrete conclusions.

16 June 2004 – TCM-21 took place with a 38-second main engine burn. It was planned as the last correction of the trajectory of Cassini before SOI. A few days later the final TCM-22 tentatively scheduled for 21 June was canceled.

1 July 2004 – The Saturn Orbit Insertion burn was successfully executed. At 7:11 p.m. PDT (10:11 p.m. EDT), Cassini crossed the ring plane between Saturn's F and G rings. Its antenna was oriented forward acting as a shield against small ring particles. At 7:36 p.m. PDT (10:36 p.m. EDT), the spacecraft began a critical 96-minute main engine burn to cut its velocity by 626 meters per second and permit a 0.02 x 9 million kilometer Saturn orbit. Right after that burn, pictures of the rings were taken and sent back to mission scientist as the spacecraft approached within 19,980 kilometers (12,400 miles) from the cloud tops. Scientists were surprised by the clarity and detail of the pictures. "We won't see the whole puzzle, only pieces, but what we are seeing is dramatic," said Dr. Carolyn Porco, Cassini imaging team leader, Space Science Institute, Boulder, Colo. "The images are mind-boggling, just mind-boggling. I've been working on this mission for 14 years and I shouldn't be surprised, but it is remarkable how startling it is to see these images for the first time."

2 July 2004 – Cassini's first flyby of Titan was executed and first close up pictures were sent back to Earth. Due to the planning of the initial orbit, Cassini was passing over the south pole of the moon and from a larger distance than in later flybys. Regardless, during a press conference on 3 June, mission scientists presented pictures that were already causing them to rethink previous theories. It now seems that the darker and brighter albedo features on the surface do represent different materials. But in contrast to expectation, the icy regions seem to be darker than the areas where other (possibly organic) matter is mixed in with the ice.

16 August 2004 – Mission scientists announce the discovery of two new moons of Saturn, and with it the successful start of one of the programs of Cassini: Locating small and yet unknown moons. Later named "Methone" (S/2004 S 1) and "Pallene" (S/2004 S 2), these objects are small compared to other moons and they orbit between Mimas and Enceladus.

23 August 2004 – At a distance of 9 million kilometers from Saturn, the last major firing of the main engine took place to adjust the next closest approach and avoid the particles in the ring system. The 51 minute burn increased the velocity of the probe by 325 meters per second, moving the orbital periapsis point about 300,000 km farther away from Saturn than its smallest distance during SOI. At the same time, the new course brought Cassini very close to Titan on its next flyby.

14 September 2004 – Final checks of the Huygens lander were completed successfully.

26 October 2004 – The second flyby of Titan (called "Titan-A") was successfully executed. Data started to arrive at the JPL mission center at 01:30 UTC, 27 October, and included the highest resolution pictures ever taken of the surface of that moon. Additionally, first high-resolution infra-red spectra and pictures were taken from the atmosphere and surface. The spacecraft successfully skimmed the hazy, smoggy atmosphere of Titan, coming within 1,176 kilometers of Titan's surface. The flyby was the closest that any spacecraft has ever come to Titan. The pictures, spectra, and radar data revealed a complex, puzzling surface. The only glitch during the "Titan-A" event involved the CIRS instrument. During playback, the instrument team observed corrupted data. A decision was made to power the instrument off to reboot it. CIRS was powered back on within 24 hours and returned to its nominal state.

23 November 2004 – The last in-flight checks of the Huygens probe before separation were completed successfully.

13 December 2004 – The "Titan-B" flyby was executed successfully.

25 December 2004 – Huygens probe separated from Cassini orbiter at 02:00 UTC.

27 December – NASA published a picture of Huygens taken from Cassini two days after its release. It reported that the analysis of that picture shows that the probe is on the correct course within the expected error range. These checks were necessary in order to place Cassini in the correct orientation to receive the data from Huygens when it entered Titan's atmosphere.

28 December 2004 – OTM-10 was executed at 03:00 UTC in Spacecraft Event Time. This maneuver, also called the Orbit Deflection Maneuver (ODM), took Cassini off of a Titan-impacting trajectory and on to a flyby trajectory with the required altitude to receive data from the Huygens probe as it plunged into Titan's thick atmosphere.

31 December 2004 – Cassini's flyby of Iapetus occurred at 18:45:37 UTC at an altitude of 122645 kilometers. First raw pictures were available the next day.

14 January 2005 – Huygens entered Titan's atmosphere at 09:06 UTC and landed softly on its surface about two hours later. This was confirmed by the reception of the carrier wave emitted by the probe during its descent and touchdown. At 16:19 UTC, the Cassini orbiter started to relay the scientific data received from the probe to Earth. The first picture was released at 19:45 UTC, showing a view from about 16 km above the surface. A second picture taken from the probe at rest on the surface was released a short time later.

15 February 2005 – Cassini executed a successful Titan flyby, with new regions of its surface scanned by radar. Cassini's mapping radar acquired a picture that shows a large crater on Titan, with an estimated diameter of 440 km (270 mi).

17 February 2005 – The first close flyby of Enceladus was executed and the first closeup images were sent back to Earth. The flyby distance was about 1,180 km (730 mi).

17 March 2005 – The Cassini probe revealed that Saturn's moon Enceladus has an atmosphere. It has been described as "substantial" by its discoverers.

16 April 2005 – The fifth planned flyby of Titan with a minimum distance of about 1,025 kilometers was executed at 19:12 UTC. This was the closest flyby up to this date, and provided the opportunity to obtain more detailed data on the constituents in the upper atmosphere of Titan. The first analysis of that data showed a large range of complex carbon molecules. On 25 April a mass plot was published that demonstrates the existence of these molecules.

3 May 2005 – Cassini begins Radio occultation experiments on Saturn's Rings, to determine ring particle size distribution, on the scale of centimeters.

10 May 2005 – At the beginning of a period of focussed observation of the ring system of Saturn, slated to take until September, mission scientists announced the discovery of a new moon in the "Keeler gap" inside the "A" ring. Provisionally named S/2005 S 1 and later named Daphnis, it was first seen in a time-lapse sequence of images taken on 1 May. Imaging scientists had predicted the new moon's presence and its orbital distance from Saturn after last July's sighting of a set of peculiar spiky and wispy features in the Keeler gap's outer edge.

14 July 2005 – The closest flyby of Enceladus with a distance of 175 km (109 mi) was executed successfully. First raw pictures were published.

7 September 2005 – Flyby of Titan at a distance of 1,075 km (668 mi), data gathered partially lost due to software problem.

26 September 2005 – Flyby of Hyperion at a distance of 1,010 km (630 mi), the closest flyby and only visit to the moon during the primary mission.

27 July 2006 – NASA confirms the presence of hydrocarbon lakes in Titan's northern polar region.

28 May 2008 – Cassini completed its 43rd flyby of Titan, ending its primary mission. Renamed Cassini Equinox mission, Cassini observed Saturn during its equinox crossing, or summertime.

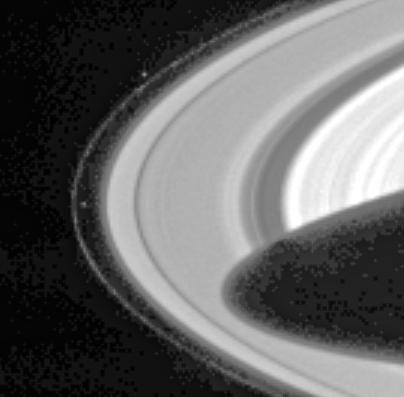
'F' Ring and shepherd moons

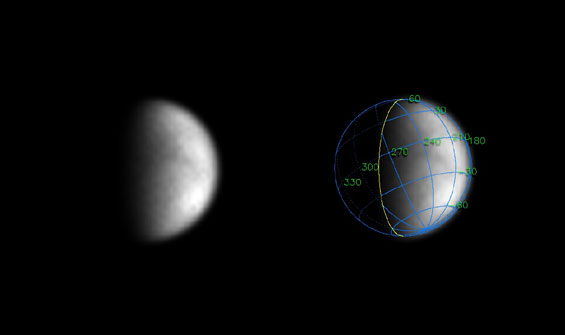
Titan, imaged on 5 May 2004

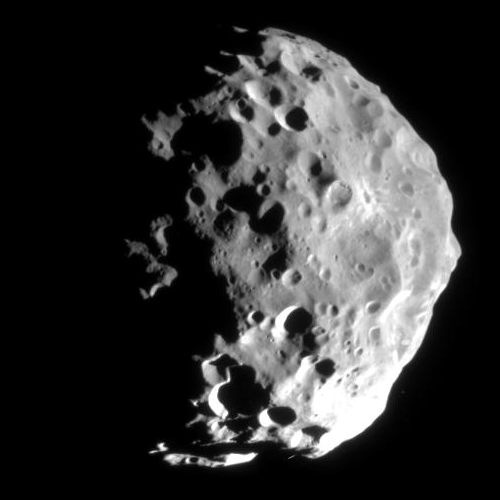
Phoebe encounter, 11 June 2004

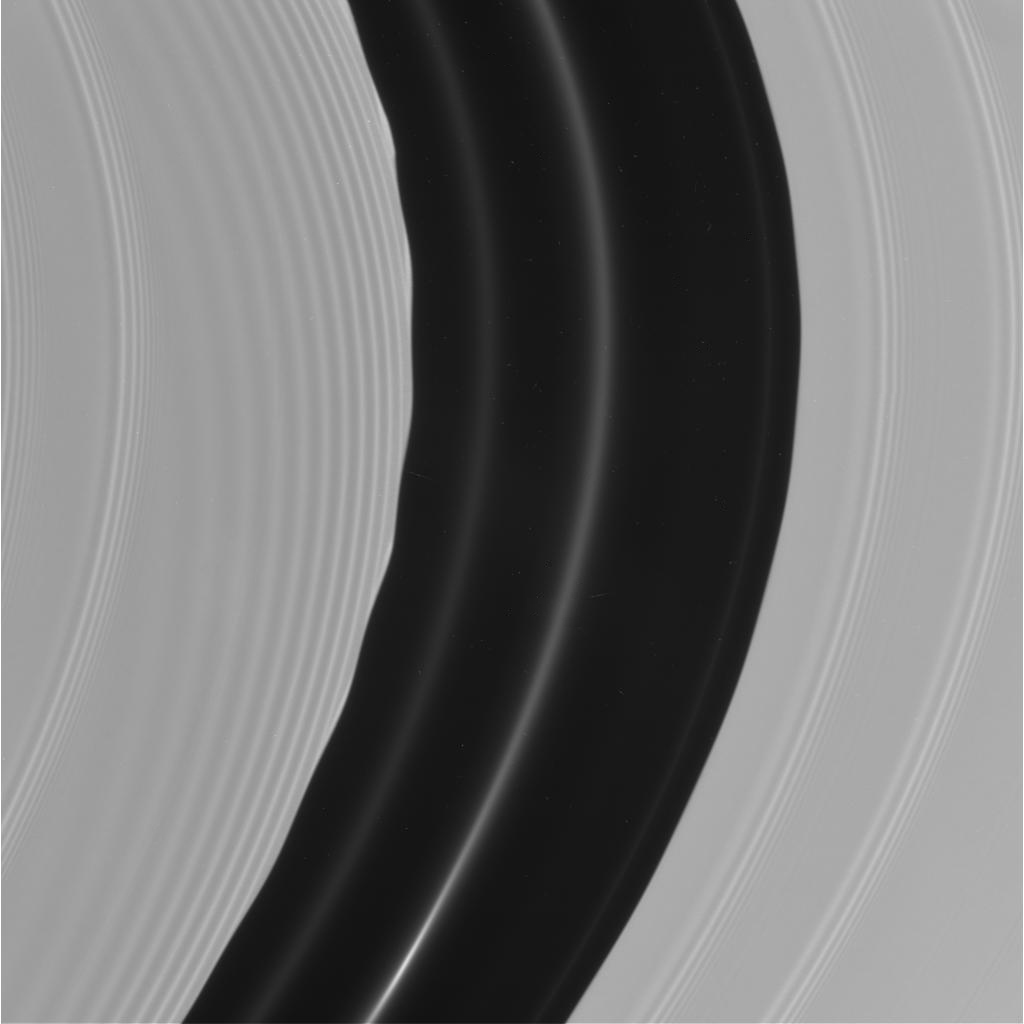
Encke gap, imaged just after orbital insertion on 1 July 2004

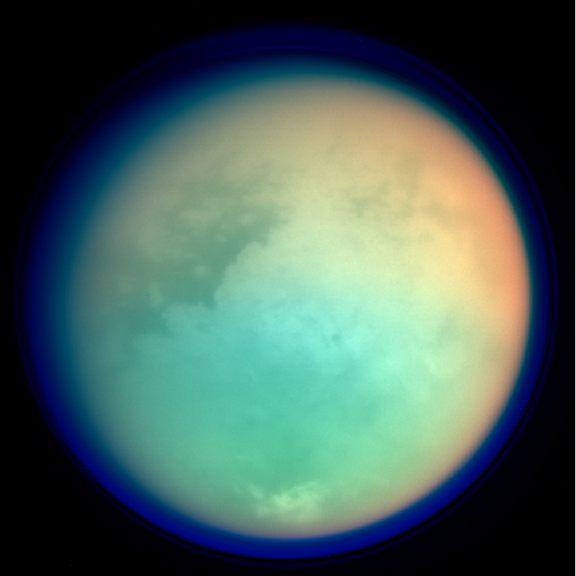
Titan in false color, imaged during Titan-A on 26 October 2004.

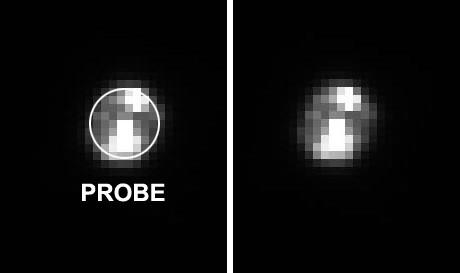
Huygens is released on its way to Titan.

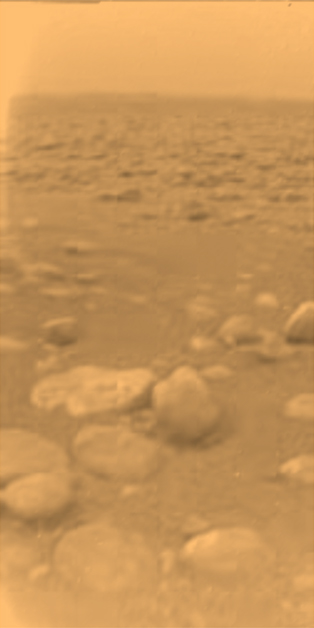
First picture from the surface of Titan

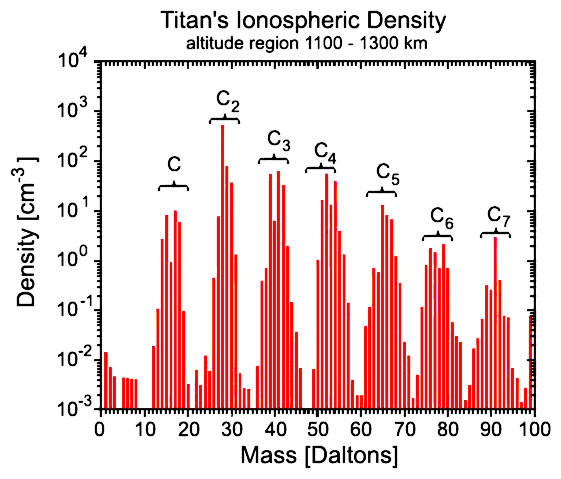
Mass spectrum of Titan's atmosphere

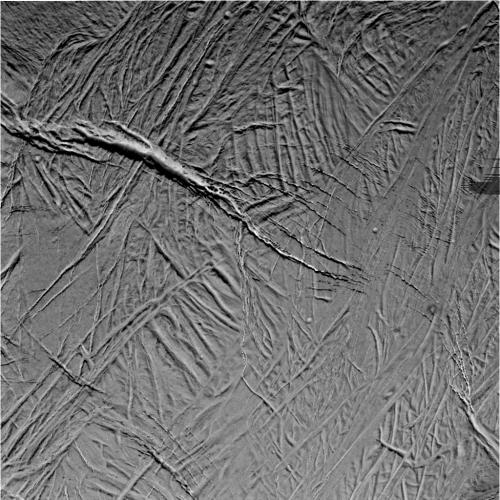
First closeup view of Enceladus

== Cassini Equinox mission (2008–2010) ==
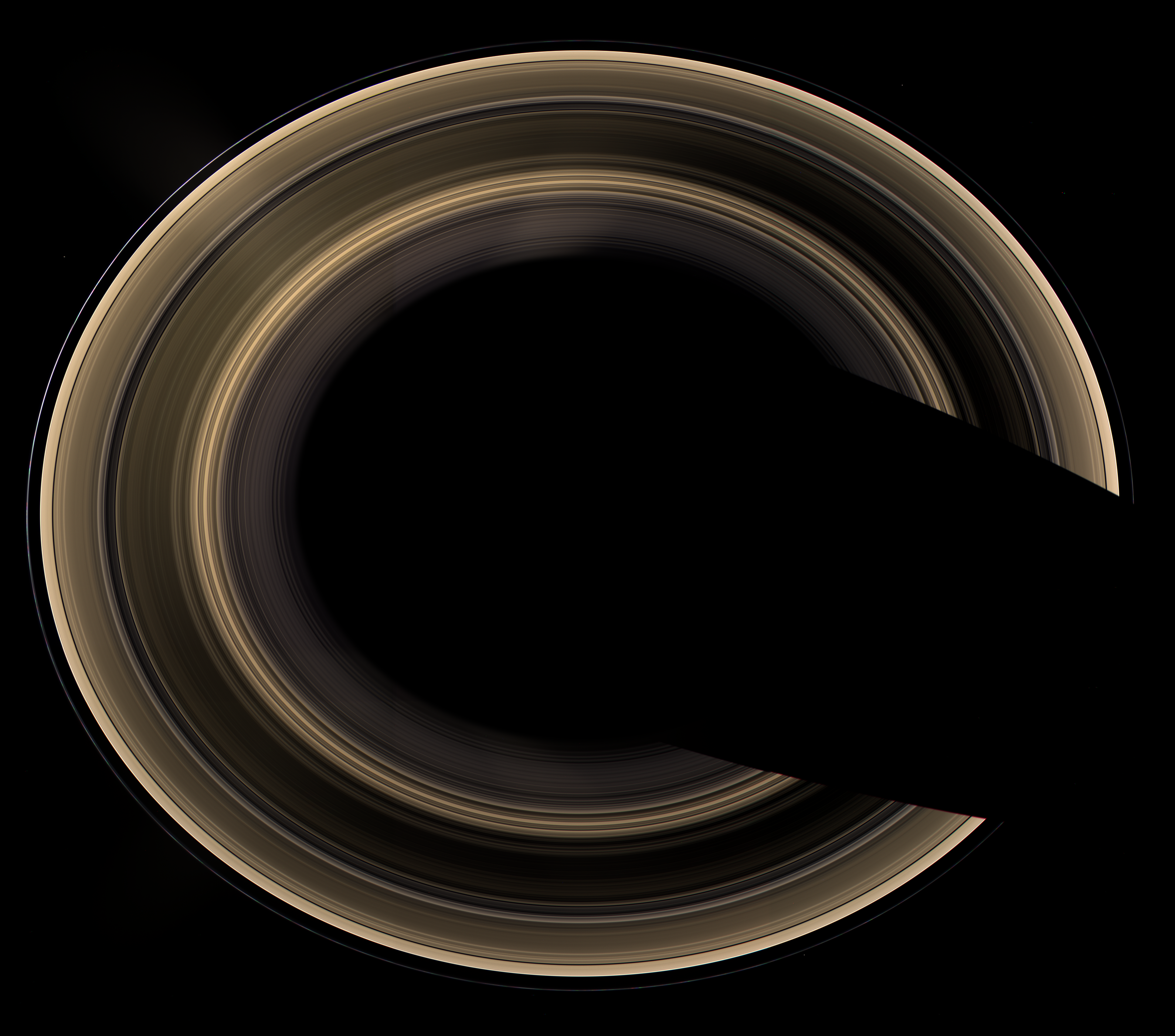
Rings from above, with Saturn cropped

9 August, 11 August, 9 October, and 31 October 2008 – With closest approach at 50, 25, and 200 km, respectively, Cassini's last three Enceladus flybys of 2008 utilized a new imaging technique named "skeet shooting" to successfully acquire very high resolution images. The flybys also allowed Cassini to directly sample Enceladus's cryovolcanic plumes.

3 November, 14 November, 5 December, and 21 December 2009 – Titan flybys 46 through 49 concentrated on radar, VIMS, and INMS sampling of Titan and its thick atmosphere. T47 involved high-resolution VIMS coverage of the Huygens landing site, while the other three flybys made use of radar and RSS. T49 allowed radar coverage of Ontario Lacus, one of the largest methane lakes on Titan.

June - October 2009 – Cassini observed Saturn during its equinox, or the time of Saturn's year where the sun is directly over its equator.

2 November 2010 – Cassini was triggered into a protective standby mode, or "safe mode", after a bit flip caused it to miss an important instruction. NASA announced the interruption in scientific processes on 8 November. However, by 8 November some of the craft's functionality had already been partly restored. Nominal scientific instrument sequencing events were successfully started on 10 November. Cassini was reactivated as scheduled on 24 November and has returned to perfect working order, in time for two scheduled close fly-bys with Enceladus. At this point there has been no public disclosure as to the data loss impact of the 11 November (T-73) flyby. However, no images were acquired on the 11 November polar flyby.

== Cassini Solstice Mission (2010–2017) ==
On 3 February 2010, NASA announced that a second mission extension until May 2017, a few months past Saturn's summer solstice, had been funded. The schedule included an additional 155 orbits, with 54 flybys of Titan, 11 of Enceladus, 2 of Rhea, and 3 of Dione. One of the flybys of Titan dipped below the ionosphere.

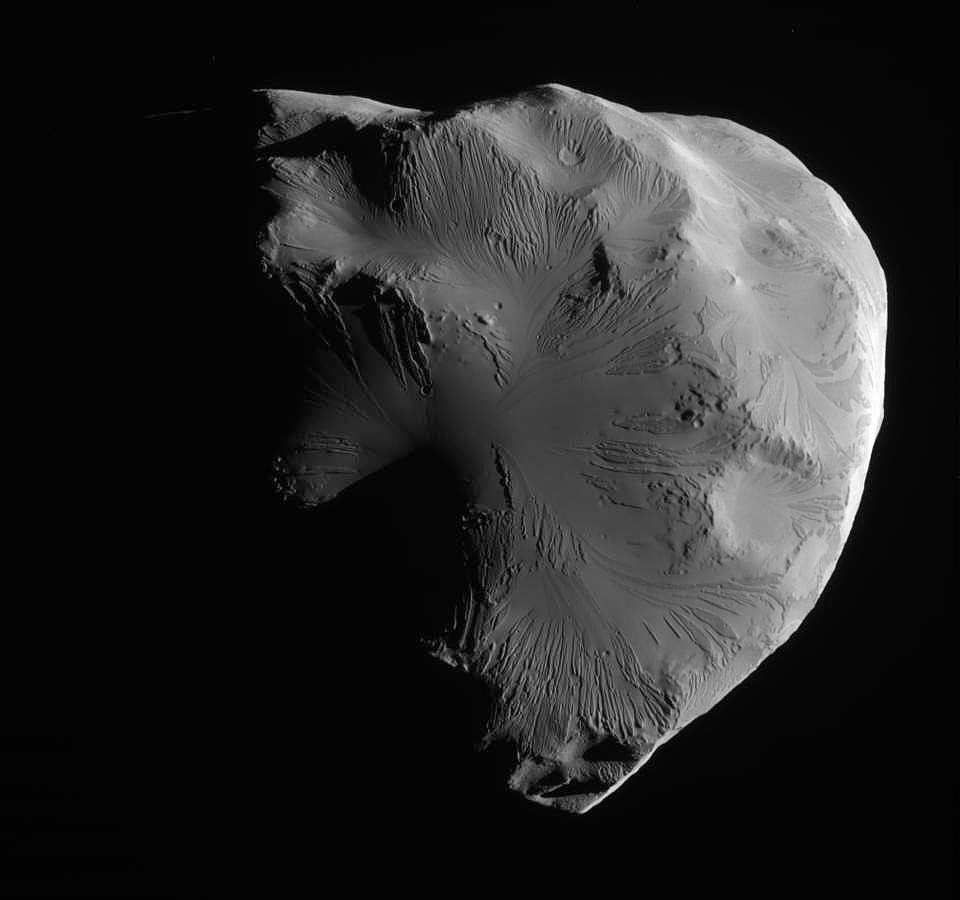
Saturn's moon Helene, 2011

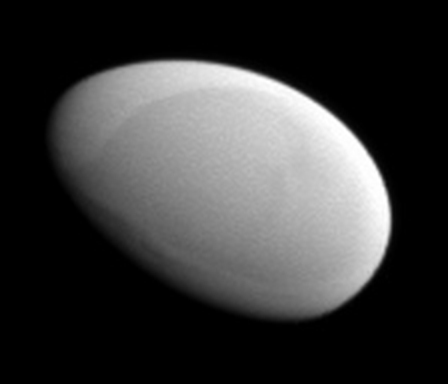
Cassini flew by Saturn's little moon Methone in May 2012

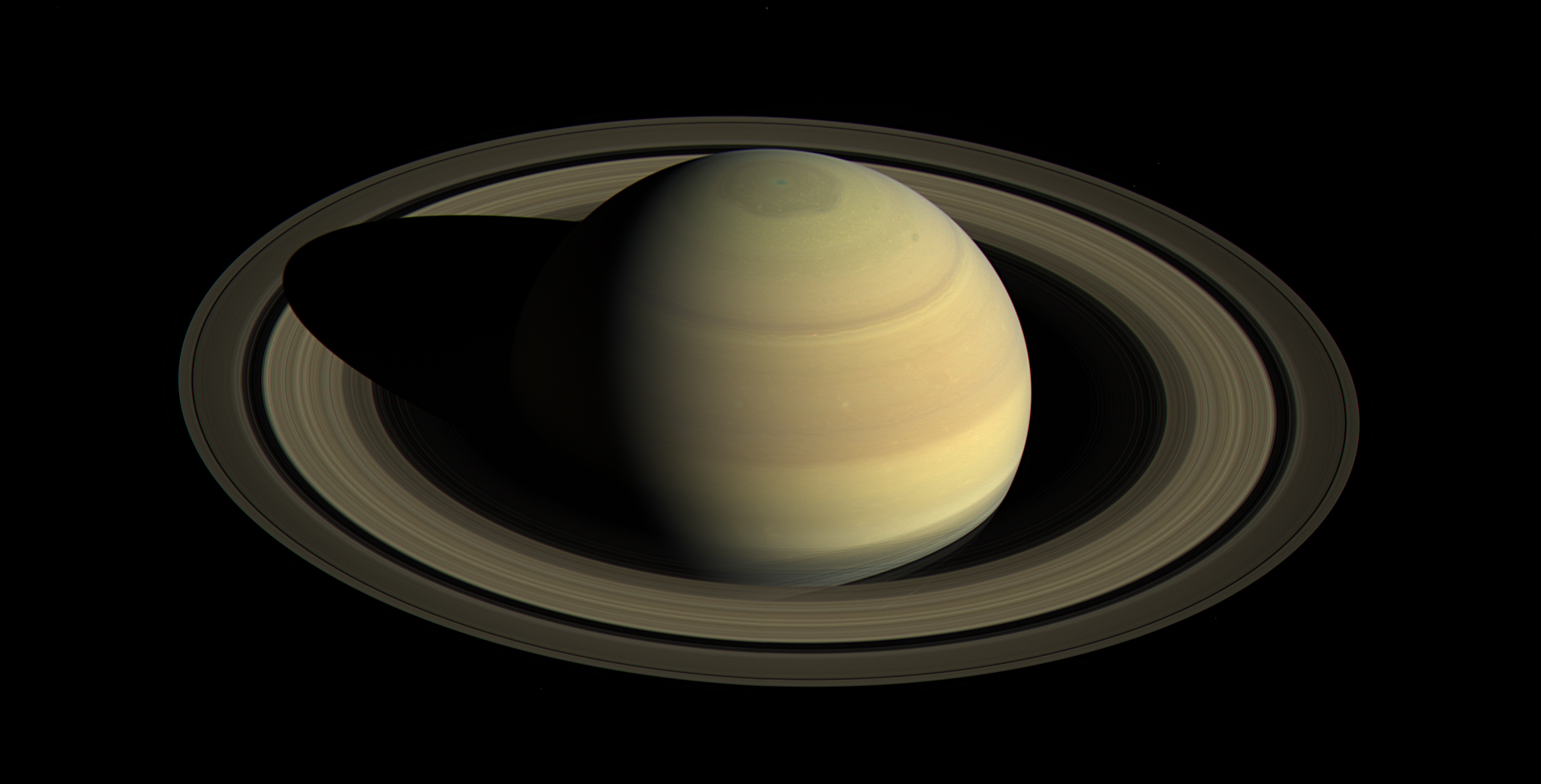
Saturn by Cassini, 2016

== Grand Finale (2017) ==
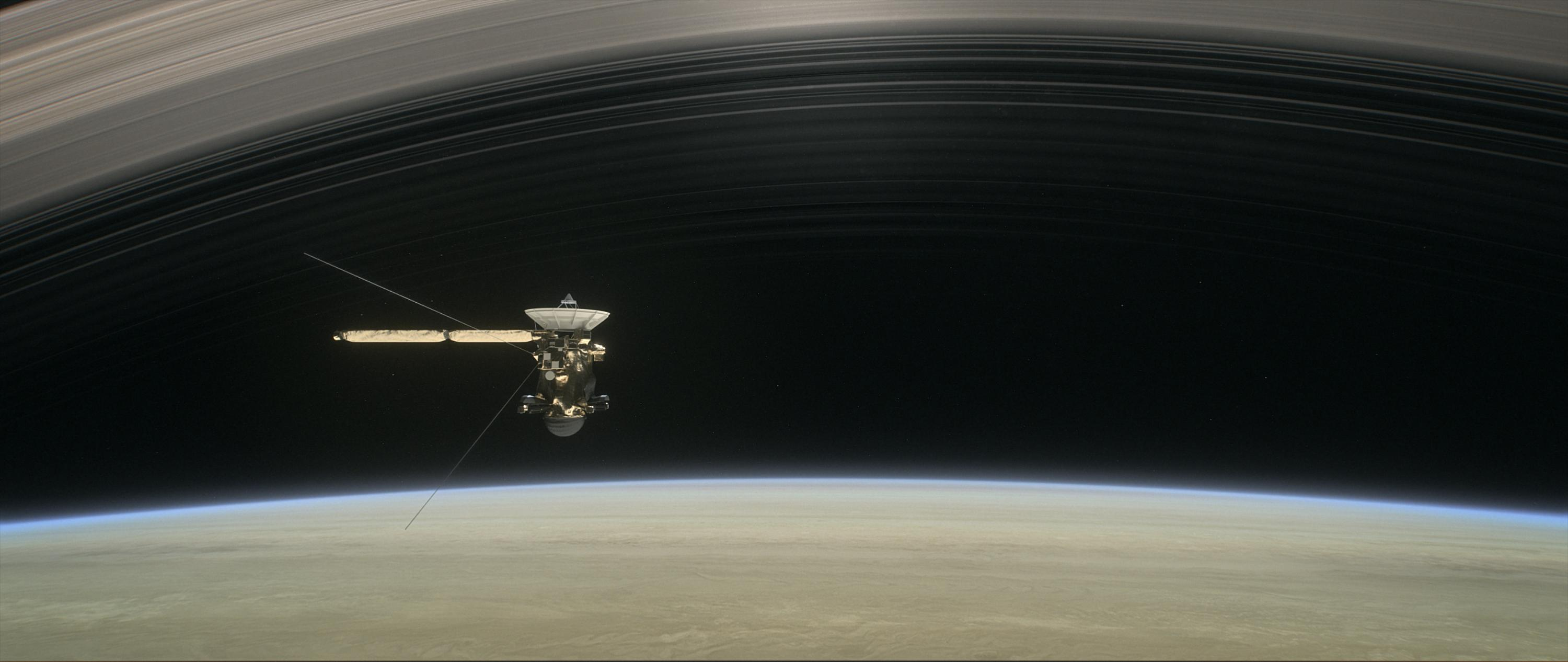
Cassini's final orbits (illustration)

On 15 September 2017, Cassini was deliberately disposed of by a controlled fall into Saturn's atmosphere, ending its nearly two-decade-long mission. The last signal was received at 11:55:46 UTC.

== Cassini orbiter travel milestones ==
Date (UTC)	Distance from Saturn
2004 March 22, 07:42:14	50,000,000 kilometers
2004 April 12, 19:35:12	40,000,000 kilometers
2004 May 04, 02:59:09	30,000,000 kilometers
2004 May 25, 02:40:06	20,000,000 kilometers
2004 June 14, 11:15:22	10,000,000 kilometers

== Detailed timeline of Huygens mission ==
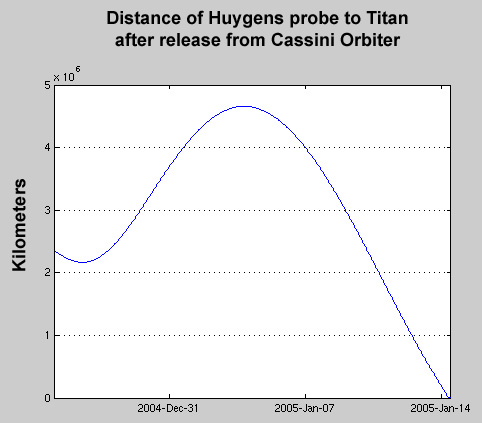
Huygens's distance from Titan

Animation of Huygens's trajectory from 25 December 2004 to 14 January 2005 Huygens · Titan · Saturn

All times given after 09:11 UTC on 14 January 2005 in the table below are the event times planned before the descent; the actual events closely followed this schedule (see below).

The data used in this section has been slightly out of date, an updated version of ephemeris from ESA was available 2005 January 6.

=== Timeline of Huygens landing process ===
Date (UTC)	Description
2004 December 25, 02:00	Huygens separates from Cassini. Its flight path initially takes it away from Titan.
2005 January 03, 20:01	Huygens reaches a maximum distance of 4,658,661 kilometers from Titan.
2005 January 11, 12:00	Cassini rise in the east (azimuth = 93 degrees) as seen from the landing site
2005 January 12, 11:20	Huygens is 1,000,000 kilometers from Titan.
2005 January 13, 09:21	Huygens is 500,000 kilometers from Titan.
2005 January 14, 04:23	Huygens is 100,000 kilometers from Titan.
2005 January 14, 06:50	Cassini turns on probe radio link receivers. Huygens is 50,000 km from Titan.
2005 January 14, 07:02	Cassini begins to turn radio dish toward Titan
2005 January 14, 07:14	Cassini turn to Titan complete; 3 minutes later orbiter X-band downlink disabled
2005 January 14, 08:29	Saturn occulted by Titan as seen from Huygens
2005 January 14, 08:38	Saturn's rings occulted by Titan as seen from Huygens
2005 January 14, 08:44	Probe turns transmitters on; low power mode
2005 January 14, 08:48	Huygens is 10,000 kilometers from Titan.
2005 January 14, 09:06	Huygens enters the atmosphere of Titan
2005 January 14, 09:09	Huygens feels maximum deceleration
2005 January 14, 09:10	Huygens deploys its pilot chute, followed closely by the main chute.
2005 January 14, 09:11	Huygens begins data transmission to Cassini.
2005 January 14, 09:18	Release front shield; transmitters switch to high power mode; instruments configured for descent and measurements commence
2005 January 14, 09:25	Main parachute separates; deploy stabilizing drogue chute
2005 January 14, 09:49	Huygens activates its surface proximity sensor, allowing it to measure its altitude and spin rate.
2005 January 14, 09:57	The Gas Chromatograph Mass Spectrometer, the last instrument to be activated, begins to sample the atmosphere.
2005 January 14, 11:12	Cassini makes its closest flyby of Titan (Titan-C) at an altitude of 59,996 kilometers at a speed of 5,401 meters per second and 93 degree phase angle (azimuth = 278 degrees, elevation = 33 degrees as seen from the landing site)
2005 January 14, 11:30	Huygens turns on its descent imager lamp.
2005 January 14, 11:37	Huygens lands on the surface of Titan
2005 January 14, 13:11	Cassini sets in the west (azimuth = 272 degrees) as seen from the landing site
2005 January 14, 13:47	Cassini stops probe data collection
2005 January 14, 18:14	Cassini sends the first of Huygens' data back to Earth.

=== Actual descent and landing ===
The descent closely followed the planned sequence. The post-mission trajectory reconstruction determined that Huygens reached its atmospheric entry interface, at an altitude of 1,270 km (790 mi), at 09:05:52 UTC spacecraft event time, and touched down at 11:38:11 UTC, after a descent under parachutes lasting 2 hours, 27 minutes and 50 seconds, compared with a pre-mission estimate of about 2 hours and 21 minutes. The first confirmation that the mission was proceeding to plan came at 10:25 UTC Earth-received time, when the Green Bank Telescope in West Virginia picked up the probe's faint carrier signal; Earth-based radio telescopes continued to detect the signal well past the probe's expected lifetime. The probe struck the surface at about 4.5 m/s (15 ft/s), digging a hole about 12 cm (4.7 in) deep before bouncing out and sliding 30 to 40 cm (12 to 16 in) across the surface. It continued to transmit from the surface for 1 hour and 10 minutes while Cassini remained above the horizon, longer than anticipated, as all five of its batteries kept working and the probe survived the landing undamaged. An error in the command sequence sent to Cassini, however, left the Channel A receiver switched off, so only 350 of the 700 images taken by the descent imager were received, and the Cassini–Huygens Doppler measurements needed by the Doppler Wind Experiment were lost; wind data were partially recovered from Earth-based Doppler observations. The first science data arrived at the European Space Operations Centre in Darmstadt at 16:19 UTC.

== Fly-bys ==
Following is a list of close fly-bys of Saturn's moons (at less than 5000 km). The closest approach for each moon is bolded.

=== Primary mission ===
Body	Date (UTC)	Altitude (kilometer)
**Phoebe**	2004 June 11, 19:33	**1,997**
Passage through rings	2004 June 30, (twice)	**0**
Orbital insertion	2004 July 1, 02:48	**0**
Titan	2004 October 26, 15:30	1,200
Tethys	2004 October 28	256,000
Titan	2004 December 13, 11:38	1,200
Probe Release	2004 December 25, 02:00	
Titan	2005 January 14, 11:12	59,996
Titan	2005 February 15, 06:58	1,577
Enceladus	2005 February 17, 03:30	1,176
**Polydeuces**	2005 February 17, 08:48	**6,447**
Enceladus	2005 March 9, 09:08	500
Titan	2005 March 31, 20:05	2,402
Titan	2005 April 16, 19:12	1,025
**Enceladus**	2005 July 14, 19:58	**175**
Titan	2005 August 22, 08:53	3,758
Titan	2005 September 7, 08:01	1,025
**Tethys**	2005 September 24, 01:36	**1,500**
**Hyperion**	2005 September 26, 01:46	**500**
**Dione**	2005 October 11, 17:59	**500**
Titan	2005 October 28, 04:04	1,451
**Rhea**	2005 November 26, 22:37	**500**
Titan	2006 January 15, 11:41	2,043
Titan	2006 February 27, 08:25	1,813
Titan	2006 March 19, 00:06	1,951
Titan	2006 April 30, 20:58	1,855
Titan	2006 May 20, 12:18	1,879
Titan	2006 July 2, 09:21	1,906
Titan	2006 July 22, 00:25	950
Titan	2006 September 7, 20:13	950
Methone	2006 September 9, 19:17	15,100
Titan	2006 September 23, 18:54	950
Titan	2006 October 9, 17:25	950
Titan	2006 October 25, 15:53	950
Titan	2006 December 12, 11:37	950
Titan	2006 December 28, 10:02	1,500
Titan	2007 January 13, 08:36	950
Titan	2007 January 29, 07:13	2,726
Titan	2007 February 22, 03:10	950
Titan	2007 March 10, 01:47	950
Titan	2007 March 26, 00:21	950
Titan	2007 April 10, 22:57	950
Titan	2007 April 26, 21:31	950
Titan	2007 May 12, 20:08	950
Titan	2007 May 28, 18:51	2,426
Titan	2007 June 13, 17:46	950
Titan	2007 June 29, 17:02	1,944
Titan	2007 July 19, 00:37	1,300
Titan	2007 August 31, 06:35	3,212
**Iapetus**	2007 September 10, 12:34	**1,227**
Titan	2007 October 2, 04:54	950
Titan	2007 November 19, 00:58	950
Titan	2007 December 5, 00:06	1,300
Titan	2007 December 20, 22:53	950
Titan	2008 January 5, 21:25	950
Methone	2008 January 15, 21:11	15,600
Titan	2008 February 22, 17:39	950
Enceladus	2008 March 12, 19:07	1,000
Titan	2008 March 25, 14:35	950
Titan	2008 May 12, 10:10	950
**Pallene**	2008 May 25, 22:06	**28,000**
Titan	2008 May 28, 08:33	1,348
**Janus**	2008 June 30, 08:58	**30,000**

=== Extended (Equinox) mission ===
Body	Date (UTC)	Altitude (kilometers)
Titan	2008 July 31, 02:13	1,613
Enceladus	2008 August 11, 21:06	54
**Enceladus**	2008 October 9, 19:07	**25**
**Pallene**	2008 October 17, 02:58	**29,000**
Enceladus	2008 October 31, 17:15	197
Titan	2008 November 3, 17:35	1,100
Titan	2008 November 19, 15:56	1,023
Titan	2008 December 5, 14:26	960
Titan	2008 December 21, 13:00	970
Titan	2009 February 7, 08:51	960
Titan	2009 March 27, 04:44	960
Titan	2009 April 4, 01:48	4,150
Titan	2009 April 20, 00:21	3,600
Titan	2009 May 5, 22:54	3,244
Titan	2009 May 21, 21:27	965
Titan	2009 June 6, 20:00	965
Titan	2009 June 22, 18:33	955
Titan	2009 July 8, 17:04	965
Titan	2009 July 24, 15:34	955
Titan	2009 August 9, 14:04	970
(Equinox)	2009 August 11	(Sun illuminates north side of rings)
Titan	2009 August 25, 12:52	970
Titan	2009 October 12, 08:36	1,300
Enceladus	2009 November 2, 07:42	99
Enceladus	2009 November 21, 02:10	1,603
Titan	2009 December 12, 01:03	4,850
Titan	2009 December 28, 00:17	955
Titan	2010 January 12, 23:11	1,073
**Calypso**	2010 February 13, 11:45	**21,000**
**Mimas**	2010 February 13	**9,500**
**Rhea**	2010 March 2, 17:41	**101**
**Helene**	2010 March 3, 13:41	**1,823**
Dione	2010 April 7, 05:16	503
Enceladus	2010 April 28, 00:11	99
Enceladus	2010 April 28, 00:11	198
Titan	2010 May 20	1,400
Titan	2010 June 5, 02:26	2,044
**Titan**	2010 June 21, 01:27	**880** (below the ionosphere)
Titan	2010 July 7	1,005
Kiviuq (light-curve data)	2010 July 15	9.3 million
Albiorix (light-curve data)	2010 July 31	?? million
Enceladus	2010 August 13	2,554

=== Solstice mission ===
The second extended mission was scheduled from 2010 October 12 through the Saturnian summer solstice in May 2017, followed by two dozen proximal orbits of Saturn and the rings. Cassini's final optical navigation image of the mission was taken on 20 September 2016. The Cassini mission ended on 15 September 2017, when the craft disintegrated in Saturn's atmosphere.

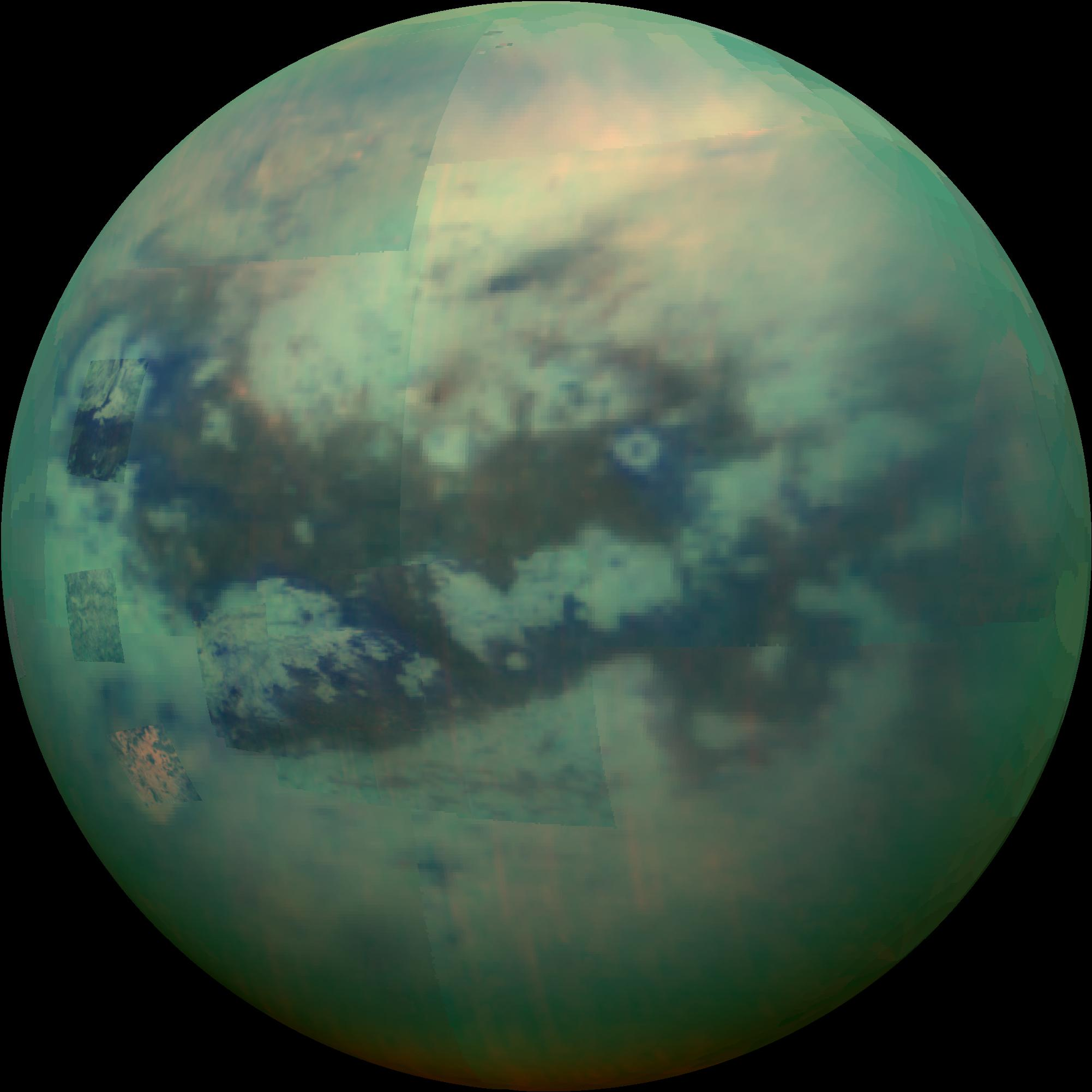
Titan – "T-114" flyby (13 November 2015)

Body	Date (UTC)	Altitude (kilometers)
**Enceladus**	2010 November 30	**48**
**Enceladus**	2010 December 21, 01:08	**48**
**Rhea**	2011 January 11, 04:53	**76**
Titan	2011 February 18, 16:04	3,651
**Telesto**	2011 March 20	**10,000**
Titan	2011 May 8, 22:54	1,873
Helene	2011 June 18	6,900
Titan	2011 June 20	1,359
**Hyperion**	2011 August 25	**25,000**
**Pallene**	2011 September 14	**26,000**
Hyperion	2011 September 16	58,000
Enceladus	2011 October 1	99
Enceladus	2011 October 19	1,231
Enceladus	2011 November 6	496
**Dione**	2011 December 12, 09:39	**99**
Titan	2011 December 13	3,586
Titan	2012 February 19	3,803
Enceladus	2012 March 27	74
Enceladus	2012 April 14	74
Enceladus	2012 May 2	74
**Telesto**	2012 May 20	**11,000**
**Methone**	2012 May 20–21	**1900**
Titan	2012 May 22	955
Titan	2012 June 7	959
Titan	2012 July 24	1,012
Titan	2012 September 26, 14:36	956
Titan	2012 November 13, 10:22	973
Titan	2012 November 29, 08:57	1,014
Titan	2013 February 17, 01:57	1,978
Rhea	2013 March 9, 18:17	997
Titan	2013 April 5, 21:44	1,400
Titan	2013 May 23, 17:33	970
Titan	2013 July 10, 13:22	964
Titan	2013 July 26, 11:56	1,400
Titan	2013 September 12, 07:44	1,400
Titan	2013 October 14, 04:56	961
Titan	2013 December 1, 00:41	1,400
Titan	2014 January 1, 22:00	1,400
Titan	2014 February 2, 19:13	1,236
Titan	2014 March 6, 16:27	1,500
Titan	2014 April 7, 13:41	963
Titan	2014 May 17, 16:12	2,994
Titan	2014 June 18, 13:28	3,659
Titan	2014 August 21, 08:09	964
Titan	2014 September 22, 05:23	1,400
Titan	2014 October 24, 02:41	1,013
Titan	2014 December 10, 22:27	980
Titan	2015 February 12, 17:08	1,200
Titan	2015 February 12, 17:08	1,200
Titan	2015 March 16, 14:30	2,274
Titan	2015 May 7, 22:50	2,722
Hyperion	2015 May 31	34,000
Dione	2015 June 16, 20:12	516
Dione	2015 August 17, 18:33	474
Titan	2015 September 28, 21:37	1,036
Enceladus	2015 October 14, 10:42	1,839
**Enceladus**	2015 October 28, 15:23	**49**
Titan	2015 November 13	11,919
**Epimetheus**	2015 December 6	**2,616**
**Prometheus**	2015 December 6	**21,000**
**Aegaeon**	2015 December 19	**2,556**
Enceladus	2015 December 19, 17:49	5,000
Titan	2016 February 1, 01:01	1,400
Titan	2016 February 16, 23:52	1,018
Titan	2016 April 4, 19:48	990
Titan	2016 May 6, 17:01	971
Titan	2016 June 7, 14:13	975
Titan	2016 July 25, 10:05	976
Titan	2016 September 27, 04:23	1,736
Titan	2016 November 14, 00:02	1,582

Proximal orbits

Body	Date (UTC)	Altitude (kilometers)
Titan	2016 November 29	3,223
**Pandora**	2016 December 18	**13,800**
**Daphnis**	2017 January 16	**17,800**
**Mimas**	2017 January 30	**41,230**
**Pan**	2017 March 7	**25,000**
**Atlas**	2017 April 12	**14,800**
**Titan**	2017 April 22, 02:08	**979**
Passage between Saturn and rings	2017 April 26	**0**
Titan	2017 September 11, 12:04	119,049
End of mission	2017 September 15, 06:58	**0**
