= Exploration of Titan =

Overview of the exploration of the moon Titan

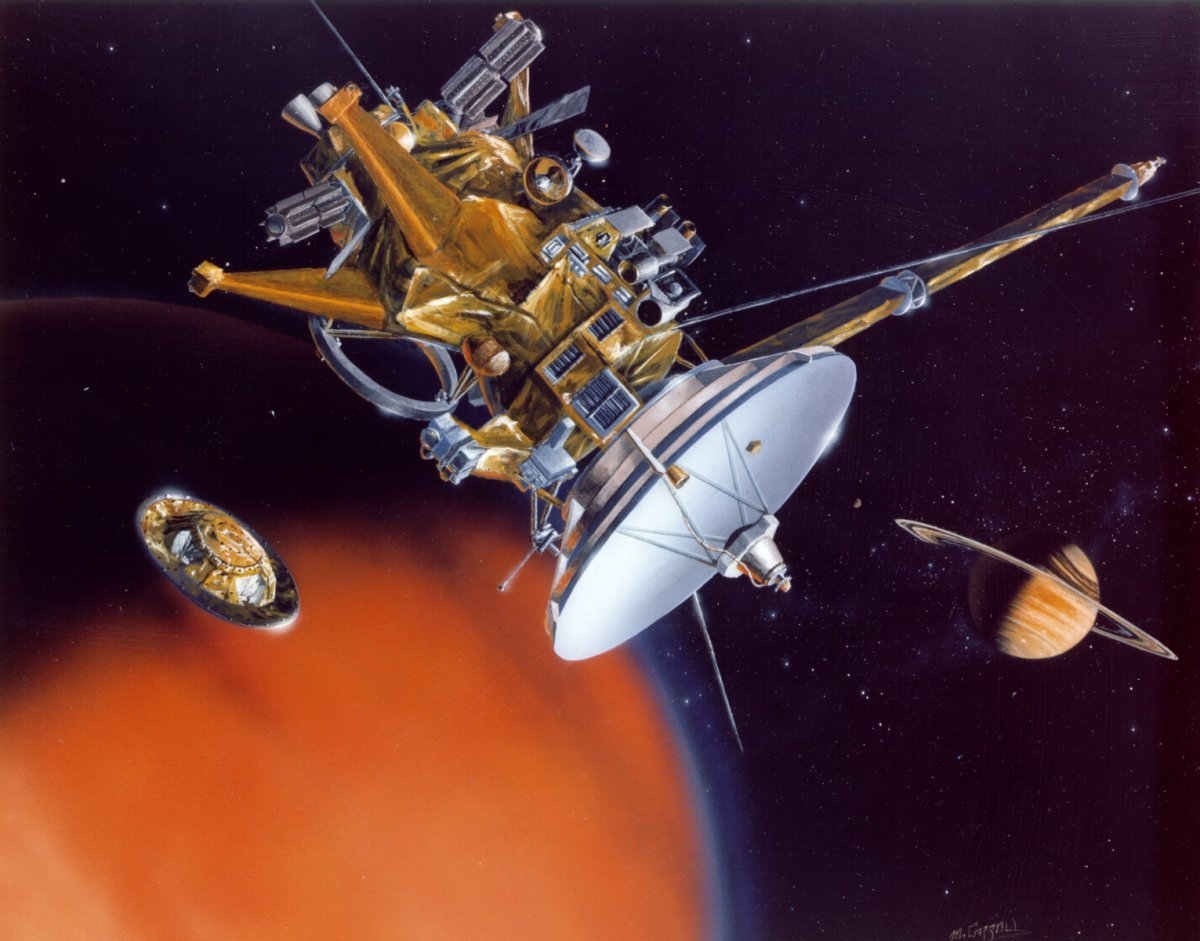
Artist's depiction of Cassini releasing Huygens, the first and only probe to land on Titan

Titan, the largest moon of Saturn, is one of the most Earth-like worlds in the Solar System. It is the only moon known to have a dense atmosphere and the only world besides Earth known to have stable bodies of liquid on its surface. Its atmosphere consists primarily of nitrogen and contains methane, which cycles through clouds, rainfall, rivers, lakes, and seas. Titan's atmosphere and surface contain complex organic compounds of interest to planetary chemistry and prebiotic research. Beneath its icy crust, Titan is thought to have a subsurface ocean containing liquid water and ammonia.

Exploration of Titan began with NASA's Pioneer 11 encounter with the Saturn system in 1979, followed by the Voyager 1 and Voyager 2 flybys in 1980 and 1981. These missions confirmed Titan's dense atmosphere while Voyager 1 showed that a thick haze obscures the surface. The Cassini–Huygens mission conducted the most extensive exploration of Titan to date, with Cassini making 127 close flybys between 2004 and 2017. Its radar and infrared instruments mapped the surface and investigated Titan's atmosphere, climate, organic chemistry, and interior, revealing a dynamic world with a methane weather cycle and a subsurface ocean. The Huygens probe, operated by the European Space Agency, became the first spacecraft to land on Titan in 2005 and remains the only spacecraft to have done so, returning the first direct measurements and images of its surface. It is also the most distant spacecraft to have landed on a planetary body.

Future exploration is planned with NASA's Dragonfly mission, a rotorcraft lander scheduled for launch in 2028 and arrival in 2034. Dragonfly will demonstrate the first powered, fully controlled atmospheric flight on a natural satellite while studying Titan's geology, atmosphere, and organic chemistry at multiple locations, including environments that may preserve evidence of prebiotic chemical processes. It will investigate how the building blocks of life form and search for possible biosignatures or chemical evidence of habitability.

== Technical requirements ==
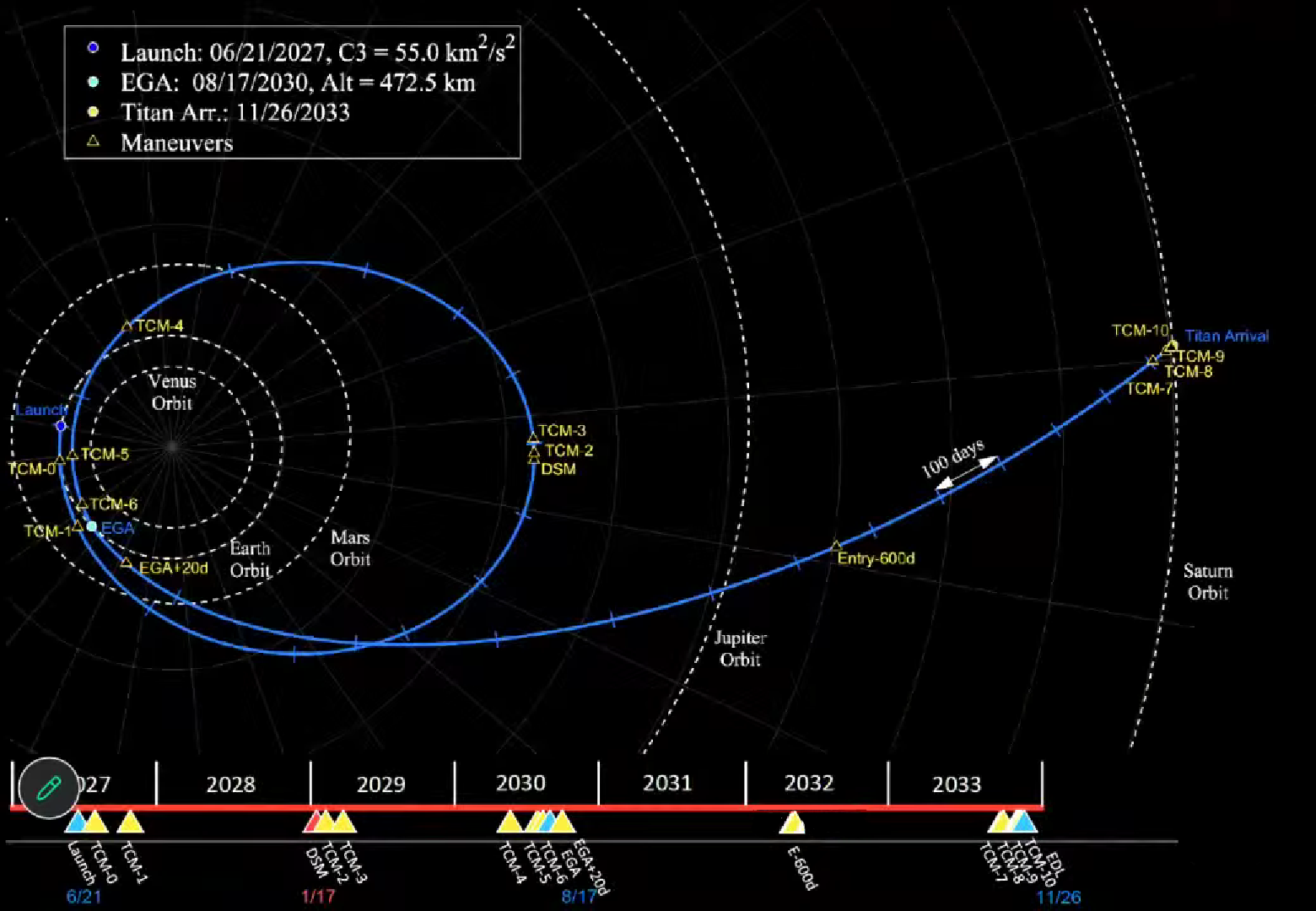
Planned trajectory from Earth to Titan for NASA's Dragonfly mission

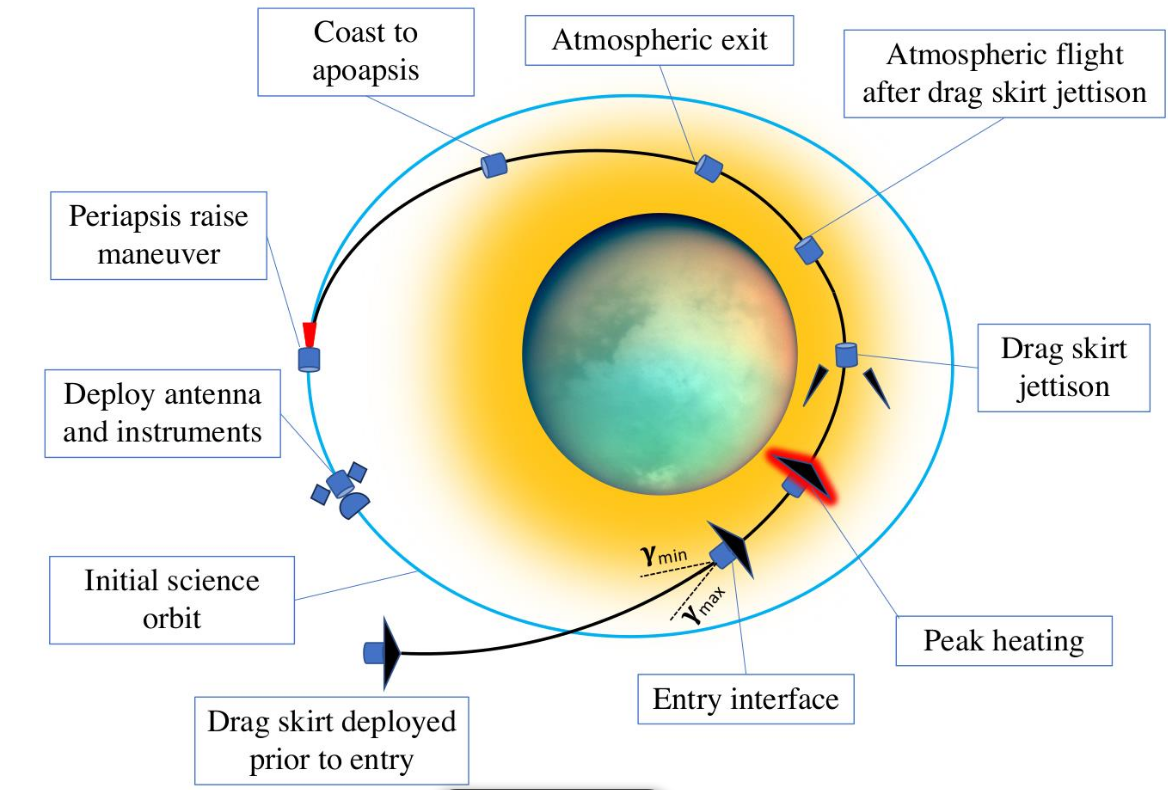
Schematic of drag modulation aerocapture for a spacecraft entering orbit around Titan

A mission to Titan requires advanced technologies to address challenges in orbital transfer, atmospheric entry, power generation, and communication. Since Saturn is located approximately 9 AU (1.3×10^{9} km; 840,000,000 mi) from the Sun, reaching the Saturn system requires significant energy. A direct Hohmann transfer from Earth to Saturn requires a total velocity change of about 10.4 km/s (6.5 mi/s). To reduce launch energy requirements and increase payload capacity, spacecraft commonly use gravity-assist maneuvers involving planets such as Venus, Earth, or Jupiter during multi-year interplanetary spaceflight.

Titan's dense nitrogen atmosphere provides opportunities for atmospheric braking techniques such as aerocapture and aerobraking. With a surface pressure approximately 1.5 times that of Earth, Titan's atmosphere can reduce spacecraft velocity before landing or orbital insertion. However, atmospheric entry at hypersonic speeds produces significant heating caused by compression and friction. Simulations indicate that spacecraft may experience peak heat fluxes of approximately 145 W/cm^{2} (940 W/sq in) due to processes within the shock layer, including the formation of cyanogen (CN) molecules. Thermal protection systems are required to withstand these conditions. The Huygens probe used silica-fiber phenolic resin materials for protection during entry, while newer spacecraft concepts, including NASA's Dragonfly mission, use advanced heat shield materials such as the phenolic-impregnated carbon ablator (PICA).

After the heat shield is released, Titan's dense atmosphere slows spacecraft descent, resulting in an entry, descent, and landing sequence lasting nearly two hours. This contrasts with the shorter landing sequences used at Mars. Although Titan's atmosphere supports parachute-based landing systems, its thick organic haze significantly reduces sunlight at the surface, leaving less than 1 percent of Earth's solar irradiance available. As a result, solar power systems are not practical for long-duration missions. Spacecraft operating on Titan use radioisotope thermoelectric generators (RTGs), which produce electricity and heat through the radioactive decay of plutonium-238. The generated heat helps maintain spacecraft systems in Titan's surface environment, where temperatures reach approximately −179 °C (−290 °F).

Communication with Titan also presents challenges because of its distance from Earth. Radio signals require a round-trip travel time of approximately 70 to 90 minutes, preventing real-time control of spacecraft operations. Missions must therefore rely on autonomous systems capable of performing navigation corrections, scientific observations, and operational adjustments without immediate instructions from Earth. High-gain communication systems and onboard computers are used to manage spacecraft activities throughout the mission.

== Flyby missions ==
=== Pioneer 11 (1979) ===
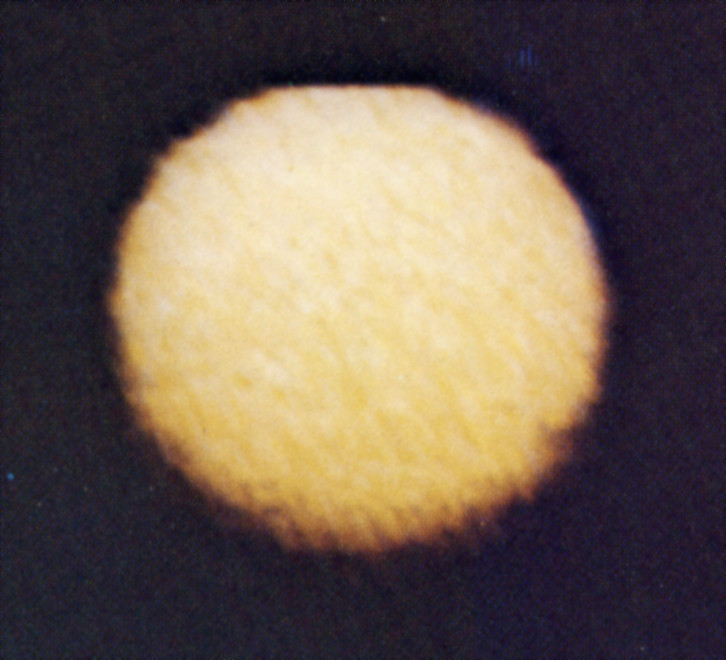
Pioneer 11 image of Titan, created by combining five frames, 2 September 1979

The first spacecraft to explore Titan was Pioneer 11, which flew past the moon at a distance of approximately 354,000 km (220,000 mi) on 2 September 1979 during its encounter with Saturn. Before the flyby, Earth-based observations had provided estimates of Titan's temperature and mass; Pioneer 11 confirmed many of them. The spacecraft found that Titan was extremely cold, with an average surface temperature of approximately −193 °C (−315 °F), indicating an environment unsuitable for known forms of life.

Titan's dense atmosphere prevented direct observation of its surface, leading some scientists at the time to overestimate its size relative to other moons. Images returned by Pioneer 11 showed Titan as a largely featureless orange world surrounded by a thick haze, with a maximum resolution of approximately 180 km (110 mi). The observations also revealed evidence of a bluish haze in the upper atmosphere.

Pioneer 11 obtained some of the first spacecraft images of Titan, including views showing both Titan and Saturn. Although these observations provided important early information about the moon's atmosphere and physical properties, they were later surpassed in detail by the data collected during the Voyager missions.

=== Voyager program (1980 and 1981) ===
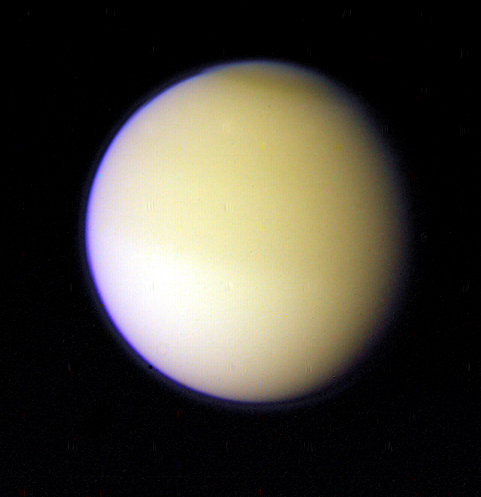
Titan as imaged by Voyager 1 during its flyby, 11 November 1980

Titan was investigated by both Voyager 1 and Voyager 2 during their encounters with Saturn in 1980 and 1981. Voyager 1 followed a trajectory designed for a close flyby of Titan, passing within approximately 6,400 km (4,000 mi) of the moon on 12 November 1980. Voyager 2 passed Titan at a much greater distance of approximately 666,190 km (413,950 mi) on 24 August 1981.

The close encounter of Voyager 1 enabled detailed measurements of Titan's mass, radius, atmospheric density, composition, temperature, and surface pressure. These observations established that Titan is the second-largest moon in the Solar System, smaller than Ganymede but larger than Mercury. The spacecraft confirmed that Titan's atmosphere is composed primarily of nitrogen, with methane and smaller amounts of hydrocarbons, including acetylene, ethane, and propane. The detection of these compounds indicated that complex chemical reactions could occur within Titan's atmosphere. Voyager 1 also observed a north–south brightness difference, which was later identified as a seasonal phenomenon.

The dense atmosphere prevented both Voyager spacecraft from directly observing Titan's surface. Images showed an orange globe completely obscured by atmospheric haze, although the spacecraft detected a bluish haze layer at higher altitudes. Prior to the flybys, some researchers had proposed that Titan might contain oceans of liquid hydrocarbons, but the opaque atmosphere prevented direct confirmation. Decades later, advanced processing of Voyager 1 imagery revealed indications of bright and dark surface regions that were subsequently identified as areas now known as Xanadu and Shangri-La.

Because Voyager 1 successfully completed the planned Titan flyby, Voyager 2 was not redirected for a similar encounter and instead continued its mission to Uranus and Neptune. Following its Saturn encounter, Voyager 1 departed the plane of the Solar System on a trajectory toward interstellar space, a path determined by the requirements of the Titan flyby.

== Orbiter missions ==
=== Cassini (2004–2017) ===
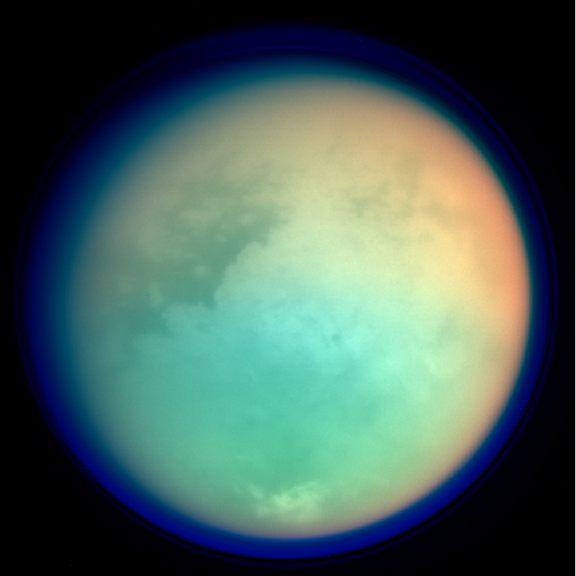
Multi-spectral view of Titan captured by Cassini using ultraviolet and infrared imaging, 26 October 2004

The joint NASA, European Space Agency (ESA), and Italian Space Agency (ASI) Cassini–Huygens mission arrived at Saturn on 1 July 2004, after which it became the first spacecraft to enter orbit around the planet, beginning an extended investigation of Titan. Cassini immediately began observing the moon using radar and infrared instruments capable of penetrating its dense atmospheric haze. The spacecraft's first Titan flyby occurred on 2 July 2004 at a distance of approximately 339,000 km (211,000 mi), revealing methane-rich clouds near the south pole and surface regions with contrasting brightness. Cassini completed its first close flyby of Titan on 26 October 2004 at a distance of about 1,200 km (750 mi). During this encounter, the spacecraft obtained the first radar images of Titan's surface, revealing a relatively young landscape and surface features hidden beneath the atmosphere.

A major achievement of the mission occurred on 14 January 2005, when the European-built Huygens probe descended through Titan's atmosphere and landed on the surface. Huygens became the first spacecraft to land in the outer Solar System. During its 150-minute descent through Titan's atmosphere, the probe collected images and measurements of the atmosphere, transmitting the data to Cassini for relay to Earth. After landing, it continued to relay data and images from Titan's surface environment for another 70 minutes. These observations provided the first direct information about Titan's lower atmosphere and surface conditions.

Over the following 13 years, Cassini conducted 127 close flybys of Titan, including its closest encounter in 2010, when it passed about 880 km (550 mi) above Titan's surface. Radar and infrared observations revealed clouds, precipitation, river channels, lakes, and seas composed primarily of liquid methane and ethane. These discoveries established Titan as the only known world besides Earth with stable liquid bodies on its surface. Radar observations obtained in 2006 identified large hydrocarbon lakes in the northern polar region, while subsequent analyses provided evidence for extensive methane and ethane seas. The mission also detected evidence for a subsurface ocean of liquid water beneath Titan's icy crust.

Cassini–Huygens produced the most detailed observations of Titan obtained to date. The mission revealed an active methane cycle, changing weather patterns, and surface processes that resemble some terrestrial geological and meteorological phenomena despite Titan's much colder environment. Cassini's final flyby of Titan took place on 22 April 2017, several months before the spacecraft concluded its mission by entering Saturn's atmosphere in September 2017 to avoid the biological contamination of potentially habitable worlds.

== Lander missions ==
=== Huygens (2005) ===
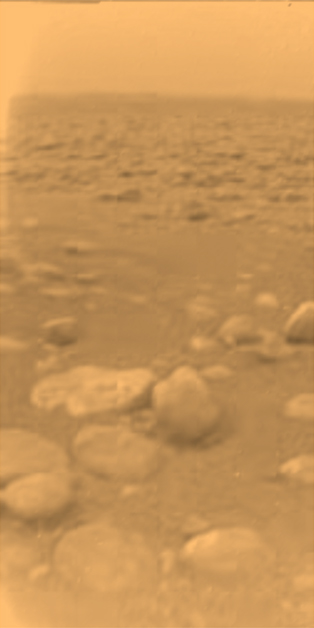
Huygens image of Titan's surface, the only image obtained from the surface of a planetary body in the outer Solar System

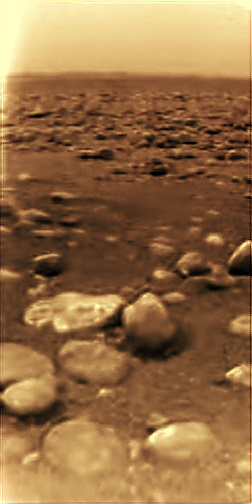
Same image with enhanced contrast

The Huygens probe was a robotic lander carried by the Cassini–Huygens mission to study Titan. It separated from the Cassini orbiter on 25 December 2004 and spent 22 days traveling toward Titan before entering the moon's atmosphere. On 14 January 2005, the probe descended by parachute and became the first and only spacecraft to land in the outer Solar System. It is also the most distant spacecraft to achieve a landing on the surface of a planetary body. During its three-hour and ten-minute descent and surface mission, Huygens collected images and measurements of Titan's atmosphere and surface, transmitting the data to the Cassini spacecraft for relay to Earth.

Huygens landed just east of the bright region later named Adiri. During its descent, the probe photographed bright, ice-rich highlands intersected by dark branching channels that extended onto a darker plain. These observations indicated that flowing liquids had shaped the landscape. Scientists concluded that the highlands are composed primarily of water ice, while darker organic materials produced in Titan's atmosphere accumulate on the surface and are redistributed by methane precipitation.

After landing, Huygens returned the first images from Titan's surface, revealing a frozen plain covered with rounded pebbles and rocks composed largely of water ice. The rounded shapes of the rocks and evidence of erosion suggested that they had been transported by flowing liquid, providing evidence for past fluvial activity. Measurements indicated that the surface consists of a mixture of water ice and hydrocarbon materials.

Huygens also obtained the first direct measurements of Titan's lower atmosphere. The probe recorded a surface temperature of 93.8 K (−179.3 °C; −290.8 °F) and a surface pressure of 1,467.6 mbar (1.4484 atm). These observations confirmed that Titan has a dense nitrogen-rich atmosphere containing methane and demonstrated that its thick atmospheric haze greatly reduces the amount of sunlight reaching the surface, making it about 1,000 times dimmer than full solar illumination on Earth. Combined with later observations from Cassini of methane and ethane lakes and seas, the Huygens mission showed that Titan possesses an active methane cycle involving rainfall, rivers, and stable surface liquids despite its extremely low temperatures.

== Future missions ==
=== Dragonfly (2028) ===
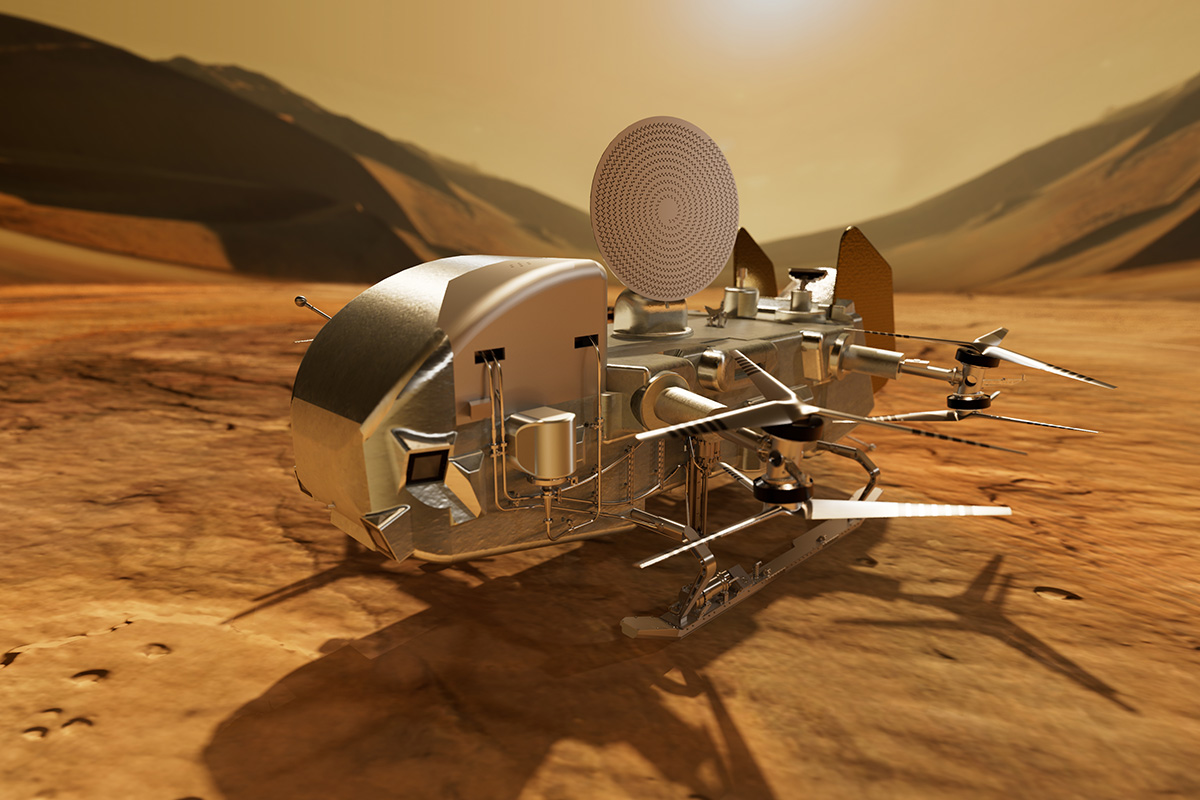
Artist's concept of the Dragonfly spacecraft on Titan's surface

Dragonfly is an upcoming NASA mission that will send a robotic rotorcraft to Titan. Planned for launch in July 2028 and arrival in 2034, Dragonfly will demonstrate the first powered, fully controlled atmospheric flight on a natural satellite. The rotorcraft will fly between multiple locations on Titan's surface, collecting samples and studying a wide range of geological environments.

The mission aims to investigate Titan's potential habitability and study its complex prebiotic chemistry. Titan is a major astrobiological target because it contains abundant carbon-rich organic compounds, a nitrogen-rich atmosphere, surface lakes and rivers of liquid hydrocarbons, and possible subsurface liquid water mixed with ammonia. These environments may resemble chemical conditions on the early Earth and could provide insight into how the building blocks of life form. Previous observations from the Huygens probe detected tholins, complex hydrocarbon materials produced in Titan's atmosphere, but the composition of many surface materials remains unknown because Titan's thick haze blocks observations at many wavelengths.

Dragonfly will analyze Titan's surface materials to determine how far prebiotic chemistry has progressed and search for possible biosignatures or chemical evidence related to habitability. Particular interest will be given to regions where liquid water may have interacted with organic compounds, such as areas affected by impacts or possible cryovolcanic activity. These locations could preserve evidence of chemical processes involving important molecules such as amino acids and other compounds associated with life.

The rotorcraft is planned to land among dunes southeast of the Selk impact crater near the dark region of Shangri-La. It will conduct a series of flights of up to 8 km (5.0 mi), exploring different environments and collecting samples before traveling toward the Selk crater. The 90 km (56 mi)-wide crater is a key scientific target because it contains evidence of past liquid water interactions, organic compounds such as tholins, and possible water-ice flows or cryovolcanic materials produced after the impact. By studying this combination of organic materials and water-related geology, Dragonfly will investigate one of the most promising environments for understanding prebiotic chemistry and the potential for life beyond Earth.

== Proposed or conceptual missions ==
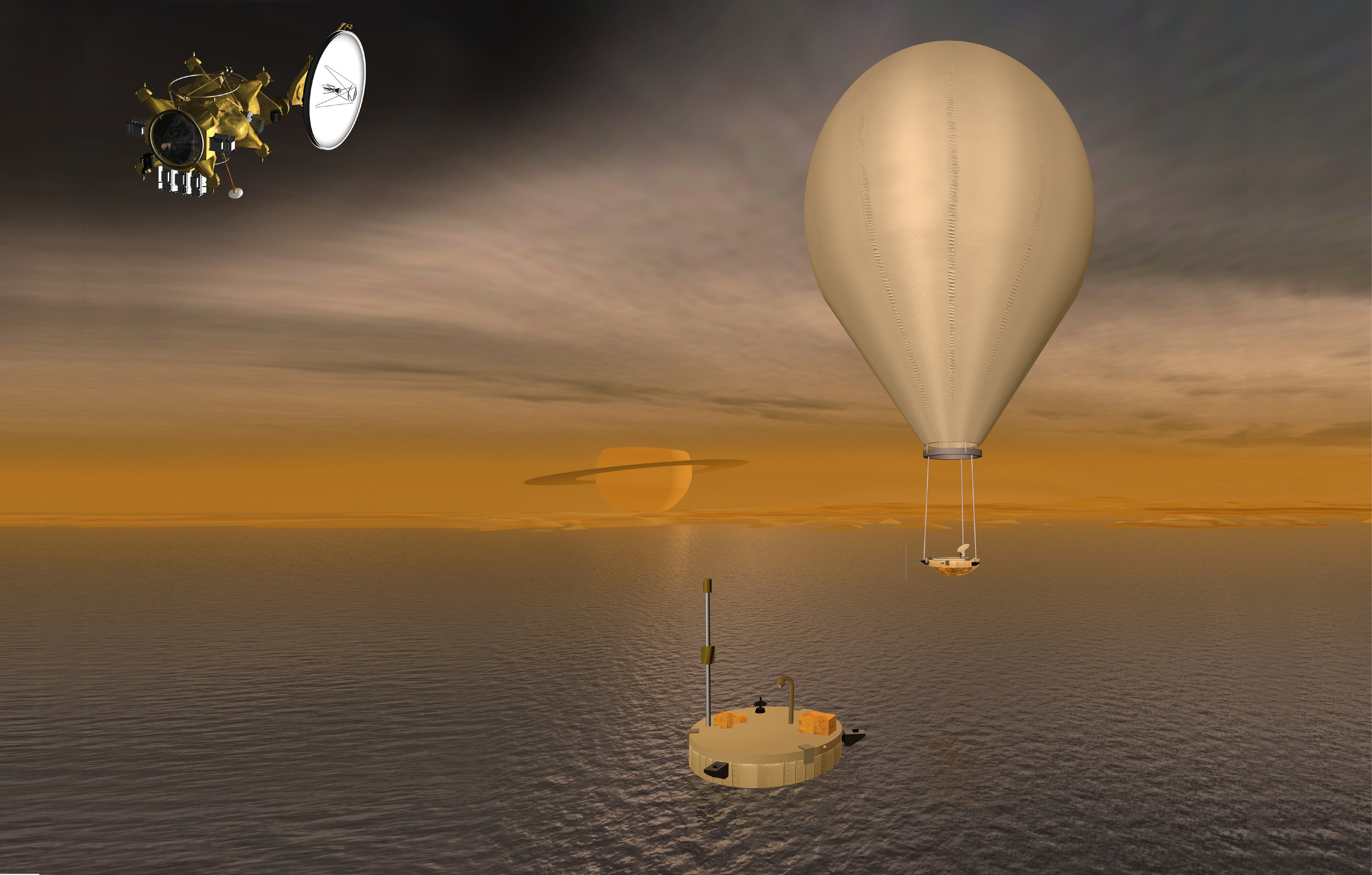
Artist's rendition of the proposed lake lander, balloon, and orbiter for the Titan Saturn System Mission

There have been several proposed missions to return robotic spacecraft to Titan following the success of Cassini–Huygens. NASA, the Jet Propulsion Laboratory (JPL), and ESA have completed conceptual studies for a range of orbital, aerial, and surface missions, although none of these proposals initially received funding for development.

One of the most ambitious concepts was the Titan Saturn System Mission (TSSM), a joint NASA–ESA proposal to explore Titan and other moons of Saturn. The mission included a hot-air balloon designed to operate in Titan's atmosphere for up to six months. TSSM competed with the Europa Jupiter System Mission (EJSM) for funding, but in 2009 NASA and ESA selected EJSM as the higher-priority mission.

Several concepts focused on exploring Titan's hydrocarbon lakes and seas. The Titan Mare Explorer (TiME) was proposed as a low-cost floating lander that would investigate the chemistry of Ligeia Mare, Titan's hydrocarbon cycle, and the moon's geological history. TiME was selected for a Phase A design study under NASA's Discovery Program in 2011 but was not chosen for flight. In 2012, the Spanish engineering company SENER and the Spanish Astrobiology Center proposed the Titan Lake In-situ Sampling Propelled Explorer (TALISE), a lake lander equipped with its own propulsion system, enabling it to navigate across Titan's lakes rather than drift passively.

Other proposals emphasized aerial exploration. In 2012, Jason Barnes of the University of Idaho proposed the Aerial Vehicle for In-situ and Airborne Titan Reconnaissance (AVIATR), an uncrewed aircraft designed to fly through Titan's dense atmosphere while collecting high-resolution images and scientific data. The proposed mission was not approved for funding.

Additional orbital concepts included Journey to Enceladus and Titan (JET), a proposed Saturn orbiter submitted to NASA's Discovery Program that would have investigated the habitability of both Titan and Enceladus. In 2015, the NASA Innovative Advanced Concepts (NIAC) program also funded a Phase II design study for the Titan Submarine, a concept intended to explore Titan's methane and ethane seas by operating beneath their surfaces.

== Human exploration ==
Human exploration of Titan is a speculative concept that has been proposed because of the moon's abundant resources and unique atmospheric properties, although no crewed missions are currently planned. Titan has a dense, nitrogen-rich atmosphere, extensive lakes and seas of liquid methane and ethane, and abundant organic compounds. Observations also indicate the possible presence of a subsurface ocean of liquid water mixed with ammonia, which could provide resources for any future human activity.

Among those who have proposed human settlement of Titan, aerospace engineer Robert Zubrin has argued that the moon possesses many of the materials needed to support a long-term human presence. In these proposals, atmospheric nitrogen could provide a habitat buffer gas, while methane and ammonia could be used for fuel production and other industrial processes.

Any human presence on Titan would face substantial technical challenges. The average surface temperature is about −179 °C (−290 °F), requiring extensive thermal protection for habitats and equipment. Titan's surface gravity is about 14 percent of Earth's gravity (0.14 g). Long-term exposure to reduced gravity below 0.4 g may pose health concerns, including bone and muscle loss. However, Titan's dense atmosphere and low gravity would make aerodynamic flight comparatively efficient, making aircraft and rotorcraft attractive concepts for exploration. Proposed energy sources include chemical energy from local hydrocarbons, wind power, tidal power from Titan's methane seas, and nuclear power systems.

== See also ==
- Exploration of Saturn
- List of missions to the outer planets
