= Oceanus (Titan orbiter) =

Proposed NASA Titan orbiter mission

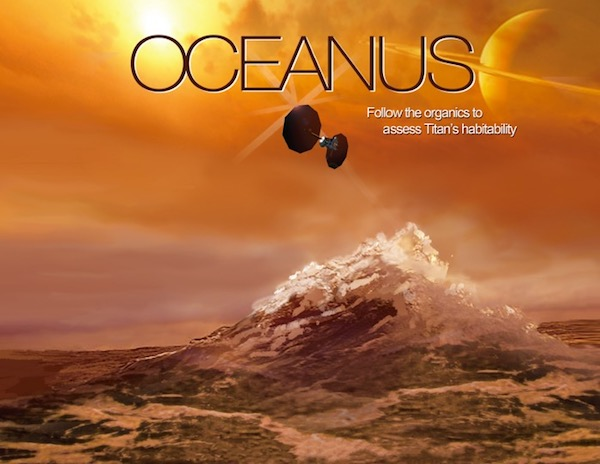
- Artist's concept of the Oceanus mission to Titan
- Mission type: Titan orbiter
- Operator: NASA / JPL
- Mission duration: 10 years (planned); 4 years (Science phase)

Spacecraft properties
- Manufacturer: Lockheed Martin; Orbital ATK
- Power: Solar arrays

Start of mission
- Launch date: February 2024 (planned)

Saturn orbiter
- Orbital insertion: 2034
- Orbital departure: 2036

Titan orbiter
- Orbital insertion: 2036
Instruments
- T-Mass: Mass Spectrometer
- T-Cam: Infrared camera
- T-Alt: Radar altimeter
- –: Radio science

Oceanus is a NASA/JPL orbiter mission concept proposed in 2017 for the New Frontiers mission #4, but it was not selected for development. If selected at some future opportunity, Oceanus would travel to Saturn's moon Titan to assess its habitability. Studying Titan would help understand the early Earth and exoplanets which orbit other stars. The mission is named after Oceanus, the Greek god of oceans.

== Mission overview ==
Titan is a world of two oceans. One ocean is on the surface and consists of mainly liquid methane (CH_{4}) and ethane (C_{2}H_{6}). The second ocean is under the surface and is made up of brine. Titan is a moon of Saturn but Titan is a large moon that is comparable in size to many planets. Titan is about the size of Mercury and about 40% the size of Earth. Ancient Earth may have had a methane-rich atmosphere with a reducing chemistry like Titan does today. By observing Titan's organic processes at work, Oceanus could help understand the role of organic haze in the early Earth. Oceanus would explore Titan and help understand habitability across the Universe.

Oceanus was proposed to launch in February 2024 with a 10-year flight time to Titan. The spacecraft would spend two years orbiting Saturn and flying by Titan which would be followed by two years in a circular Titan orbit. The spacecraft would be powered by solar panels. A small lake probe may also be considered for this mission.

Methane clouds on the surface of Titan

Abiotic organic synthesis occurs high in Titan's atmosphere, and a vast water ocean lies far beneath the icy crust, setting up possible chemistry and environment for abiogenesis and potential habitable niches for microorganisms. Oceanus would conduct its science investigations with a multistage mass spectrometer, an infrared camera that sees through the atmosphere, and a radar altimeter.

Oceanus is led by Christophe Sotin, the chief scientist for Solar System exploration at NASA's Jet Propulsion Laboratory in Pasadena, California.

== Objectives ==
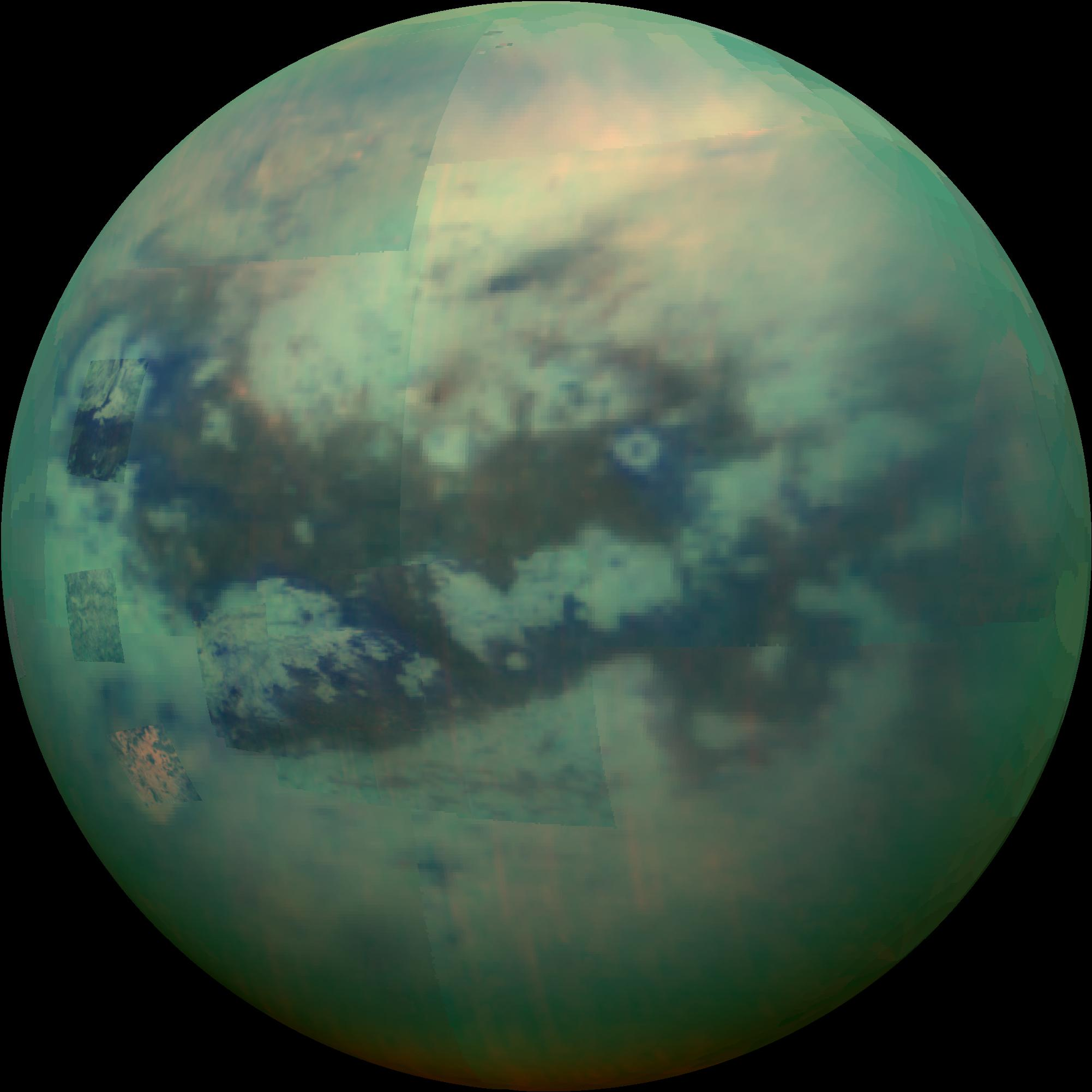
Infrared view of Titan

Oceanus objectives are to reveal Titan's organic chemistry, geology, gravity, topography, collect 3D reconnaissance data, catalog the organics and determine where they may interact with liquid water.

Titan has the basic ingredients for habitability: water, energy, and organic molecules. On a 4-year global exploration, Oceanus would characterize Titan's habitability globally, the photochemical synthesis of organics in the upper atmosphere, and determine places where they could potentially mix with liquid water.

== Proposed development ==
The mission would be managed by NASA/JPL. JPL would also build parts of the radar and camera, and provide a mass spectrometer. The spacecraft would be developed by Lockheed Martin and derived from their proven central core cylinder designs. This configuration has been successfully applied on Mars Reconnaissance Orbiter, Juno, MAVEN, and OSIRIS-REx. The spacecraft would use Ultraflex solar arrays made by Orbital ATK. The Italian Space Agency (ASI) and its contractor Thales would supply the digital portion of the radar altimeter and parts of the telecommunications system.

On 20 November 2017, NASA selected two other proposals for additional concept studies: Comet Astrobiology Exploration Sample Return (CAESAR), and Dragonfly). Had Oceanus been selected, it would have launched in 2024.

== Science instruments ==
There are three science instruments on Oceanus plus radio science measurements:

1. T-Mass is a multistage quadrupole ion-trap mass spectrometer which would investigate organics in the Titan atmosphere.
2. T-Cam is an infrared camera that would see through the infrared windows in Titan's atmosphere to be able to image Titan surface despite the atmospheric haze.
3. T-Alt is a radar altimeter which would help to establish Titan's topography and, jointly with radio science observations, would allow accurate ocean measurements. T-Alt, jointly with T-Cam, will allow the scientists to assess how the organic material is transported on the surface and where are the possible locations where mixing between water and organics could take place.

=== Science team members ===
The Principal Investigator of the mission is Christophe Sotin (JPL), his Deputy is Alexander Hayes (Cornell University), the Project Scientist is Michael Malaska (JPL) and the legacy Project Scientist is Julie Castillo-Rogez. The Science Team come from JH APL, Lockheed Martin, JPL, ASI, Caltech, Cornell University, MIT, SWRI, University of Arizona, USGS, PSI, UCSC, University of Idaho, and several foreign universities.

== See also ==
- Exploration of Titan
  - Explorer of Enceladus and Titan (E^{2}T)
  - Journey to Enceladus and Titan (JET)
  - Titan Lake In-situ Sampling Propelled Explorer (TALISE)
  - Titan Mare Explorer
- Lakes of Titan
