= Lander (spacecraft) =

Type of spacecraft

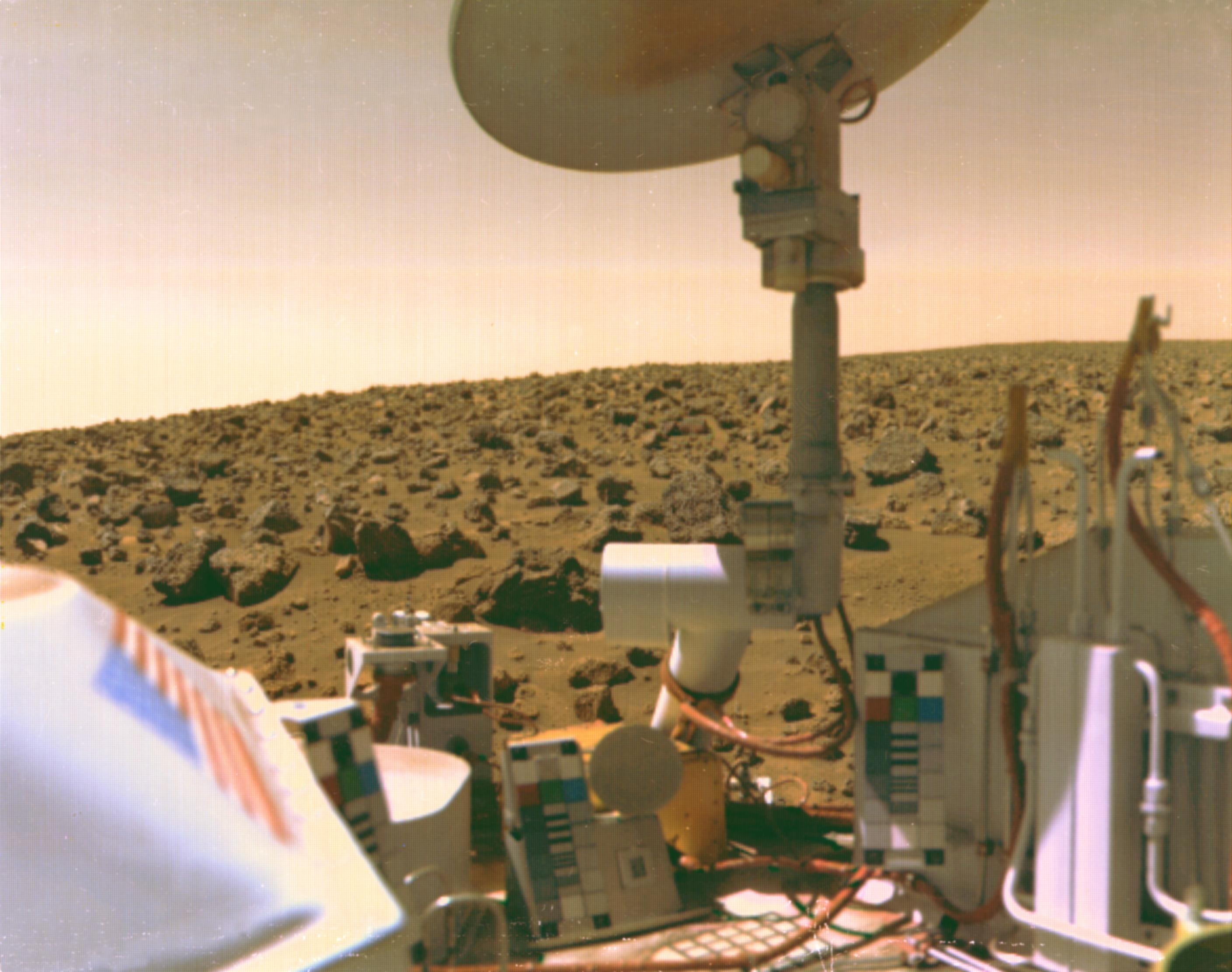
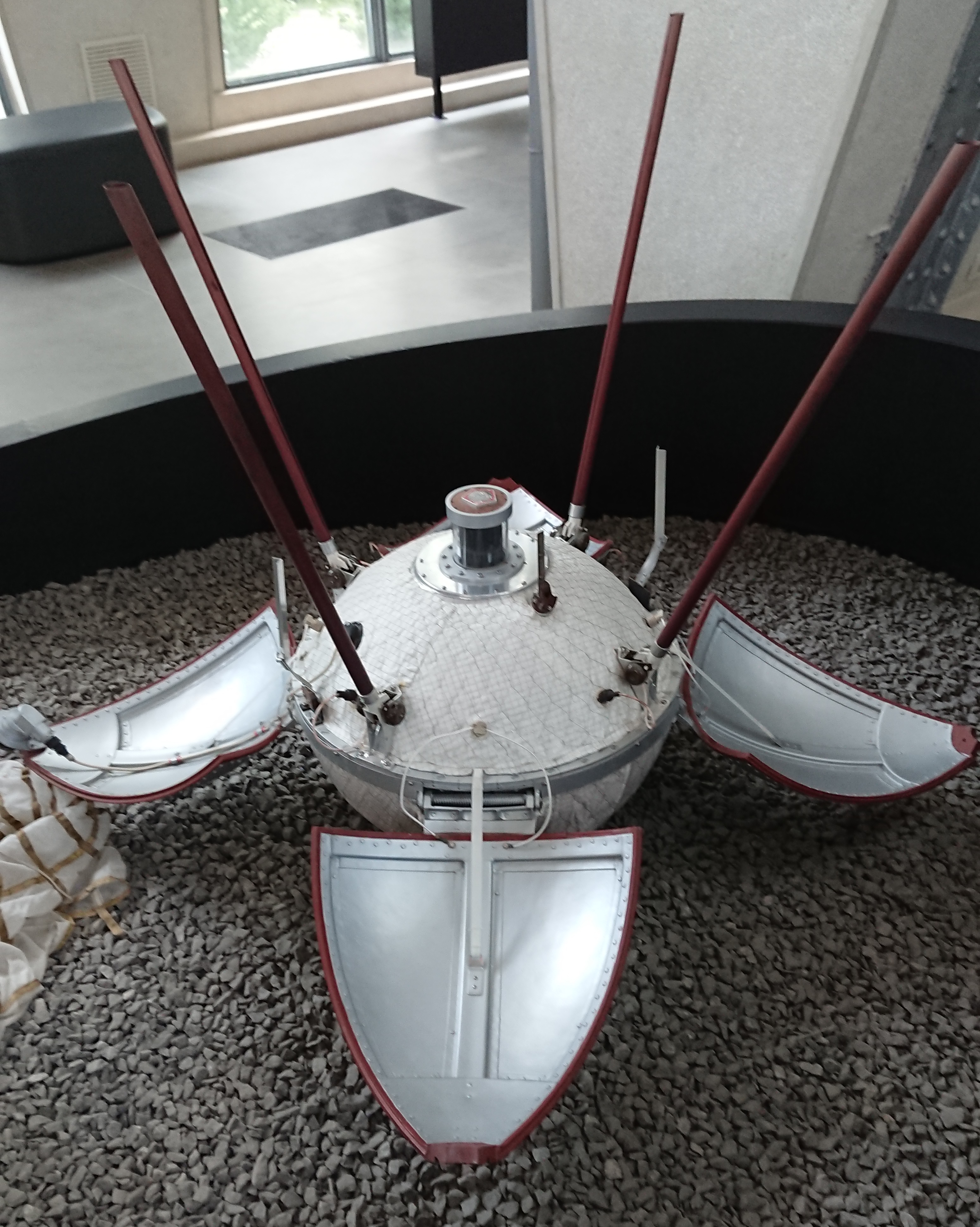
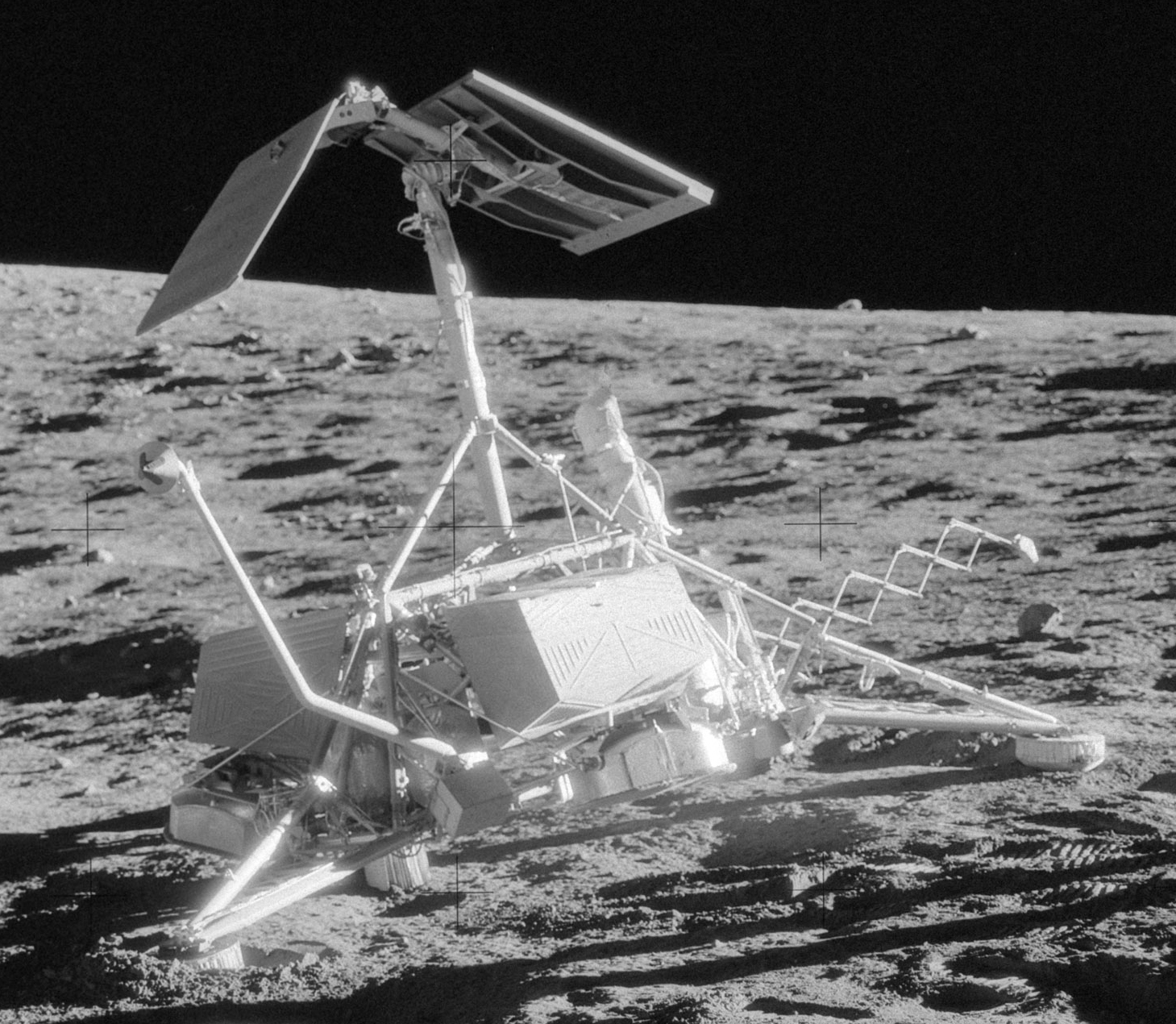
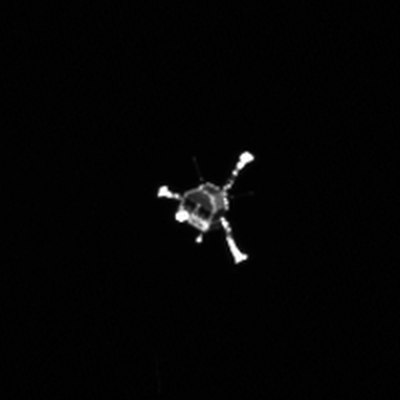
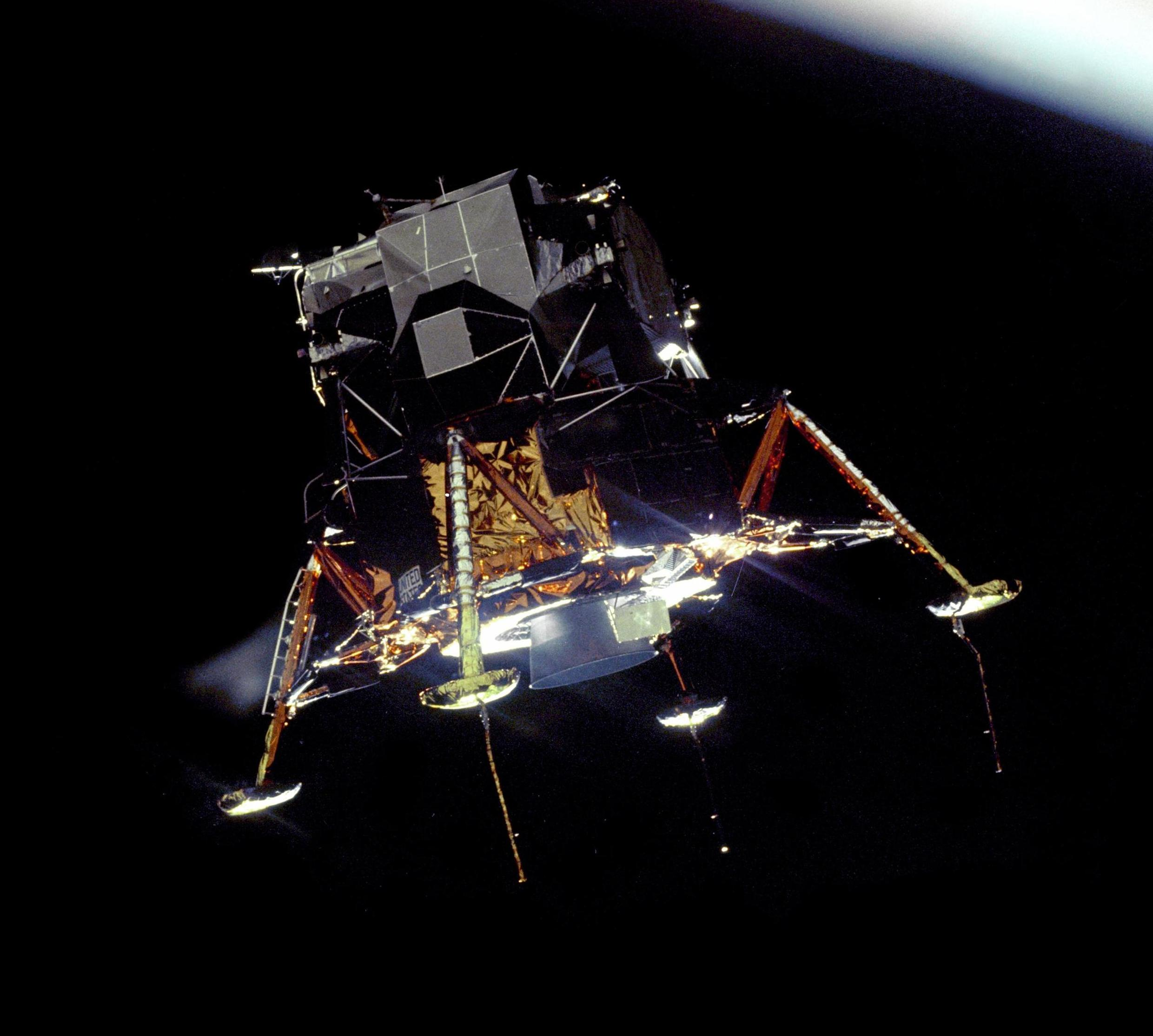
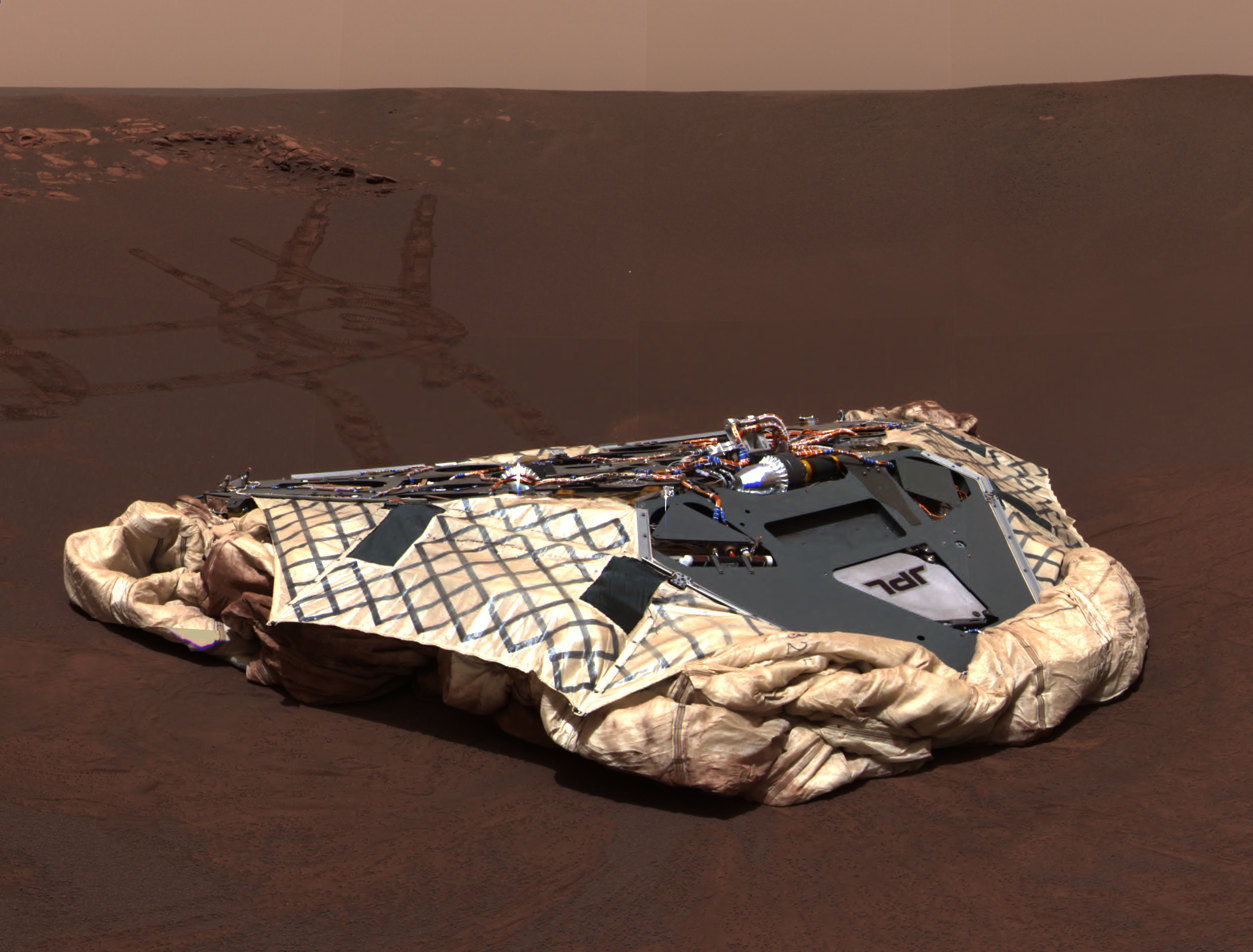
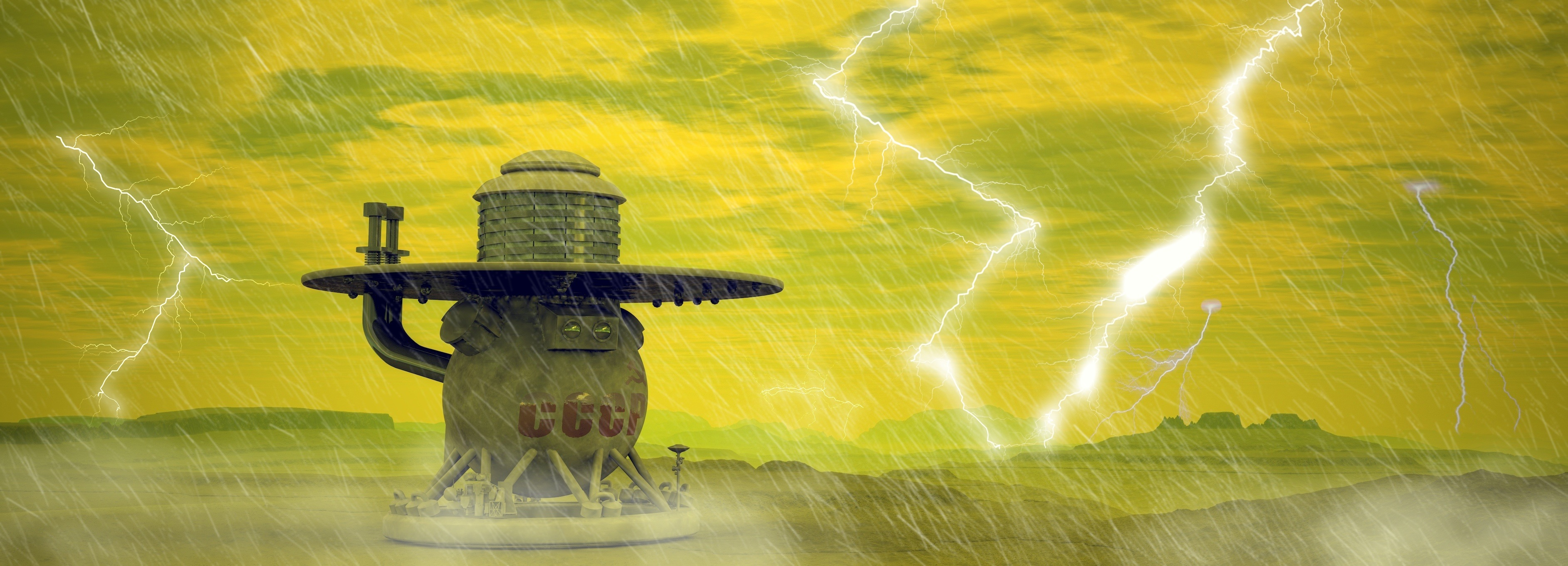
Examples of landers. From top left, clockwise: the Viking 2 lander on Mars; a model of Luna 9, the first successful lander on another planetary body; Philae on its way to land on the comet 67P/Churyumov–Gerasimenko; the lander module of the Opportunity rover on Mars; an artistic representation of a Venera lander on Venus; Apollo 11 lunar module Eagle in landing configuration in lunar orbit; the lander Surveyor 3 on the Moon photographed by Apollo 12 astronaut Alan Bean.

A lander is a spacecraft that descends towards, then comes to rest on the surface of an astronomical body other than Earth. In contrast to an impact probe, which makes a hard landing that damages or destroys the probe upon reaching the surface, a lander makes a soft landing after which the probe remains functional.

For bodies with atmospheres, the landing occurs after atmospheric entry. In these cases, landers may employ parachutes and atmospheric entry to slow the probe down to maintain a low terminal velocity. In some cases, small landing rockets will be fired just before impact in order to reduce the lander's velocity on impact. Landing may be accomplished by controlled descent and set down on landing gear, with the possible addition of a post-landing attachment mechanism (such as the mechanism used by Philae) for celestial bodies with low gravity. Some missions (for example, Luna 9 and Mars Pathfinder) used inflatable airbags to cushion the lander's impact rather than utilizing more traditional landing gear.

When a high-velocity impact is intentionally planned in order to study the consequences of impact, the spacecraft is called an impactor.

Several terrestrial bodies have been subject to lander or impactor exploration. Among them are Earth's Moon; the planets Venus, Mars, and Mercury; Saturn's moon Titan; asteroids; and comets.

== Landers ==
=== Lunar ===
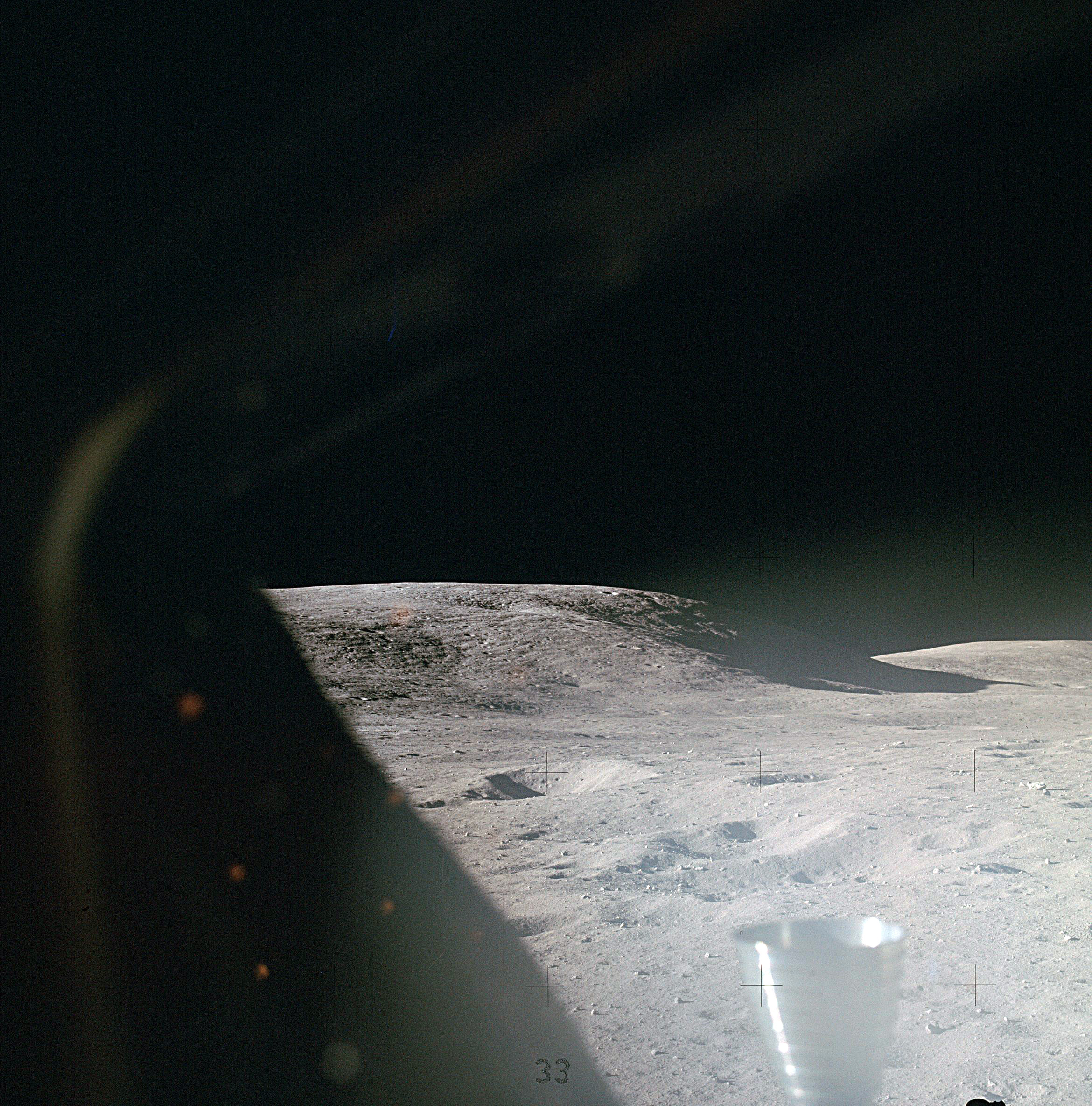
The lunar surface through the Apollo 16 Lunar Module window shortly after landing

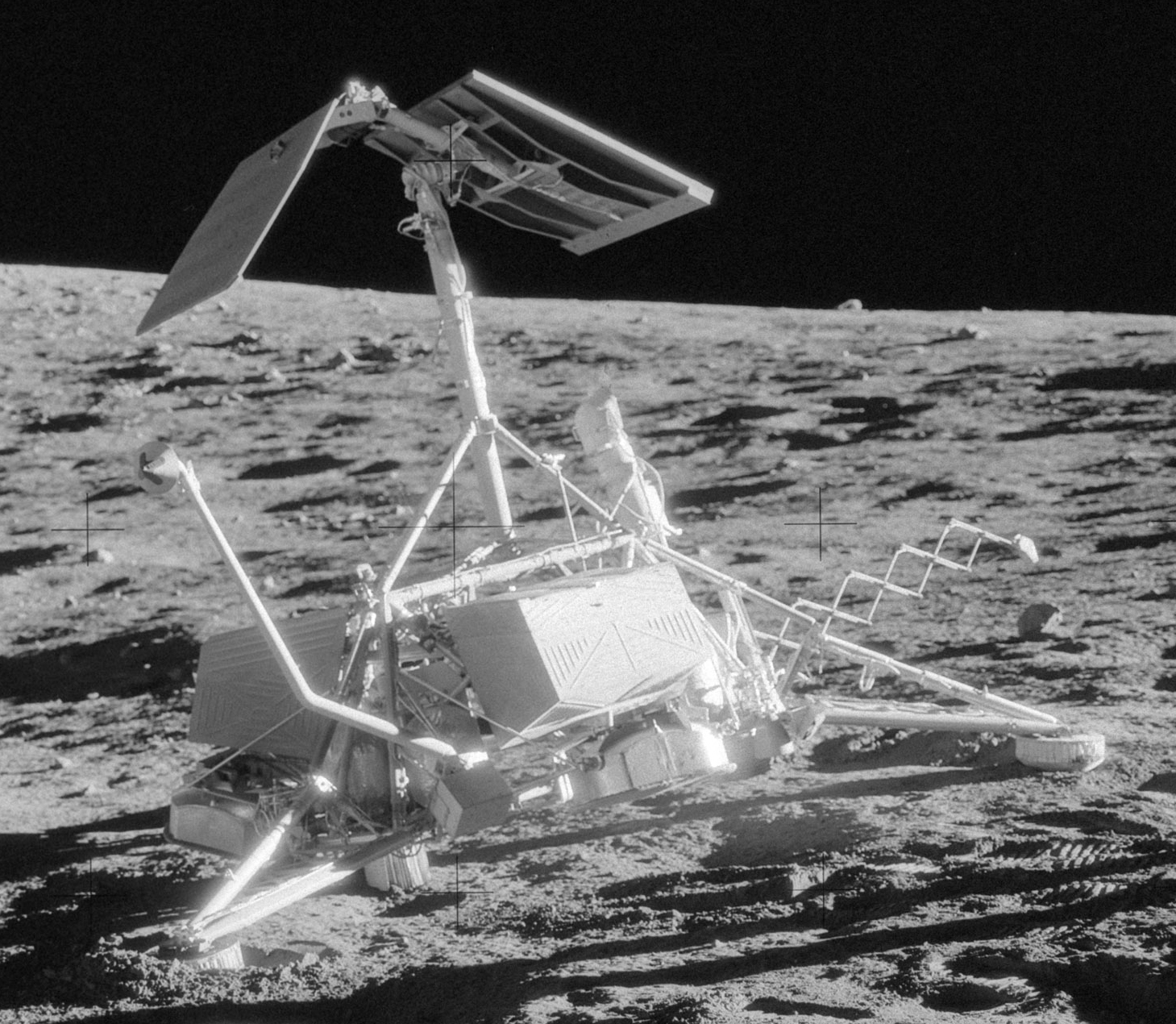
Surveyor 3 on the Moon

Beginning with Luna 2 in 1959, the first few spacecraft to reach the lunar surface were impactors, not landers. They were part of the Soviet Luna program or the American Ranger program.

In 1966, the Soviet Luna 9 became the first spacecraft to achieve a lunar soft landing and to transmit photographic data to Earth. The American Surveyor program (1966–1968) was designed to determine where Apollo could land safely. As a result, these robotic missions required soft landers to sample the lunar soil and determine the thickness of the dust layer, which was unknown before Surveyor.

The U.S.-crewed Apollo Lunar Modules (1969–1972) with rovers (1971–1972) and late Soviet large robotic landers (1969–), Lunokhods (1970–1973) and sample return missions (1970–1976) used a rocket descent engine for a soft landing of astronauts and lunar rovers on the Moon.

The Chinese Chang'e 3 mission and its Yutu ('Jade Rabbit') rover landed on 14 December 2013. In 2019, China's Chang'e 4 mission successfully landed the Yutu-2 rover on the far side of the Moon. Chang'e 5 and Chang'e 6 are designed to be sample return missions. Chang'e 5 and 6 were conducted successfully in 2020 and 2024 respectively. Chang'e 5 mission landed on the Moon on 1 December 2020, China completed the Chang'e 5 mission on 16 December 2020 with the return of approximately 2 kilograms of lunar sample.

On 6 September 2019, the lander Vikram on Chandrayaan-2, attempting to land on the lunar south polarregion. Due to software glitch, it lost contact and crashed moments before landing.

About 4 years later, on 23 August 2023, the lander Vikram on Chandrayaan-3 successfully touched down on the lunar south pole, close to the crater Manzinus U. This made it the first lander to soft land at the south pole of the Moon.

Japan became the fifth country to land a lunar probe on 19 January 2024, by successfully landing its SLIM lander.

On 22 February 2024, Intuitive Machine's Odysseus successfully landed on the Moon after taking off on a SpaceX Falcon 9. This was the first successful landing of a privately owned spacecraft on the Moon.

China sent Chang'e 6 on 3 May 2024, which conducted the first lunar sample return from Apollo Basin on the far side of the Moon. This is China's second lunar sample return mission, the first was achieved by Chang'e 5 from the lunar near side four years earlier. It also carried the Chinese Jinchan rover to conduct infrared spectroscopy of lunar surface and imaged Chang'e 6 lander on lunar surface. The lander-ascender-rover combination was separated with the orbiter and returner before landing on 1 June 2024 at 22:23 UTC. It landed on the Moon's surface on 1 June 2024. The ascender was launched back to lunar orbit on 3 June 2024 at 23:38 UTC, carrying samples collected by the lander, and later completed another robotic rendezvous and docking in lunar orbit. The sample container was then transferred to the returner, which landed in Inner Mongolia on 25 June 2024, completing China's far side extraterrestrial sample return mission.

On 2 March 2025, Firefly Aerospace's Blue Ghost lander successfully soft landed on the Moon as part of NASA's commercial lunar delivery program.

Planned for 2028, NASA's Artemis IV would be the first crewed lunar landing in over 50 years, utilizing the Orion spacecraft. The planned landing site is the lunar south pole, with the mission lasting for ~30 days with the goal of a sustained lunar presence.

=== Venus ===
The Soviet Venera program included a number of Venus landers, some of which were crushed during descent much as Galileo's Jupiter "lander" and others which successfully touched down. Venera 3 in 1966 and Venera 7 in 1970 became the first impact and soft landing on Venus respectively. The Soviet Vega program also placed two balloons in the Venusian atmosphere in 1985, which were the first aerial tools on other planets.

=== Mars ===
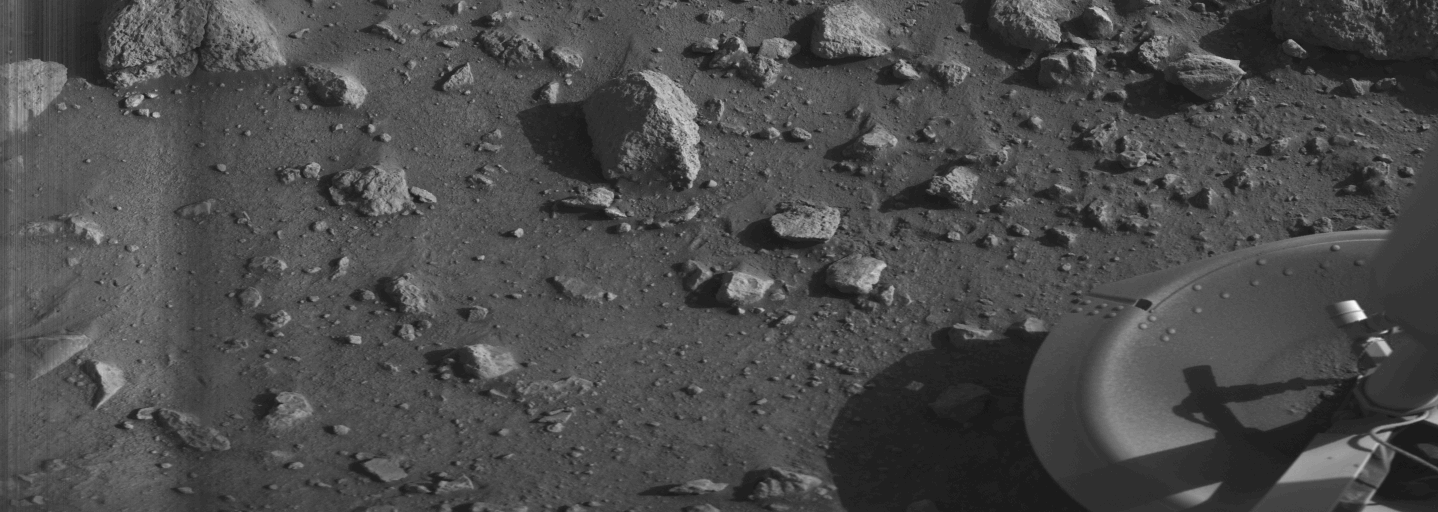
First "clear" image ever transmitted from the surface of Mars – shows rocks near the Viking 1 lander (July 20, 1976)

The Soviet Union's Mars 1962B became the first mission intended to impact on Mars in 1962. In 1971, the lander of the Mars 3 probe conducted the first soft landing on Mars, but communication was lost within a minute after touchdown, which occurred during one of the worst global dust storms since the beginning of telescopic observations of the Red Planet. Three other landers, Mars 2 in 1971 and Mars 5 and Mars 6 in 1973, either crashed or failed to even enter the planet's atmosphere. All four landers used an aeroshell-like heat shield during atmospheric entry. Mars 2 and Mars 3 landers carried the first small skis-walking Mars rovers, PrOP-M, that did not work on the planet.

The Soviet Union planned the heavy Marsokhod Mars 4NM mission in 1973 and the Mars sample return Mars 5NM mission in 1975, but neither occurred due to needing the N1 super-launcher that was never flown successfully. A double-launching Soviet Mars 5M (Mars-79) sample return mission was planned for 1979 but cancelled due to complexity and technical problems.

NASA's Viking 1 and Viking 2 were launched respectively in August and September 1975, each comprising an orbiter vehicle and a lander. Viking 1 landed in July 1976 Viking 2 in September 1976. The Viking program rovers were the first successful, functioning Mars landers. The mission ended in May 1983, after both landers had stopped working.

Mars 96 was the first complex post-Soviet Russian mission with an orbiter, lander, penetrators. Planned for 1996, it failed at launch. A planned repeat of this mission, Mars 98, was cancelled due to lack of funding.

The U.S. Mars Pathfinder was launched in December 1996 and released the first acting rover on Mars, Sojourner, in July 1997. It worked until September 1997.

The Mars Polar Lander ceased communication on 3 December 1999 prior to reaching the surface and is presumed to have crashed.

The European Beagle 2 lander deployed successfully from the Mars Express spacecraft but the signal confirming a landing which should have come on 25 December 2003 was not received. No communication was ever established and Beagle 2 was declared lost on 6 February 2004. The proposed 2009 British Beagle 3 lander mission to search for life, past or present, was not adopted.

The American Mars Exploration Rovers Spirit and Opportunity were launched in June and July 2003. They reached the Martian surface in January 2004 using landers featuring airbags and parachutes to soften impact. Spirit ceased functioning in 2010, more than five years past its design lifetime. As of 13 February 2019, Opportunity was declared effectively dead, having exceeded its three-month design lifetime by well over a decade.

The U.S. spacecraft Phoenix successfully achieved soft landing on the surface of Mars on 25 May 2008, using a combination of parachutes and rocket descent engines.

Mars Science Laboratory, which carried the rover Curiosity, was launched by NASA on 26 November 2011. It landed in the Aeolis Palus region of Gale Crater on Mars on 6 August 2012.

China launched the Tianwen-1 mission, on 23 July 2020. It includes an orbiter, a lander and a 240 kilograms rover. The orbiter was placed into orbit on 10 February 2021. The Zhurong successfully soft landed on 14 May 2021 and deployed on 22 May 2021.

=== Martian moons ===
While several flybys conducted by Mars orbiting probes have provided images and other data about the Martian moons Phobos and Deimos, only few of them intended to land on the surface of these satellites. Two probes under the Soviet Phobos program were successfully launched in 1988, but in 1989 the intended landings on Phobos and Deimos were not conducted due to failures in the spacecraft system. The post-Soviet Russian Fobos-Grunt probe was an intended sample return mission to Phobos in 2012 but failed after launch in 2011.

In 2007 European Space Agency and EADS Astrium proposed and developed the mission to Phobos to 2016 with lander and sample return, but it stayed as a project. Since 2007 the Canadian Space Agency has considered a mission to Phobos called Phobos Reconnaissance and International Mars Exploration (PRIME), which would include an orbiter and lander. Recent proposals include a 2008 NASA Glenn Research Center Phobos and Deimos sample return mission, the 2013 Phobos Surveyor, and the OSIRIS-REx II mission concept.

The Japanese Aerospace Exploration Agency (JAXA) plans to launch the Martian Moons Exploration (MMX) mission in 2026, a sample return mission targeting Phobos. MMX will land and collect samples from Phobos multiple times, along with deploying a rover jointly developed by CNES and the German Aerospace Center (DLR). By using a corer sampling mechanism, the spacecraft aims to retrieve a minimum of 10 g of samples. MMX will return to Earth in 2029.

=== Titan (moon of Saturn) ===
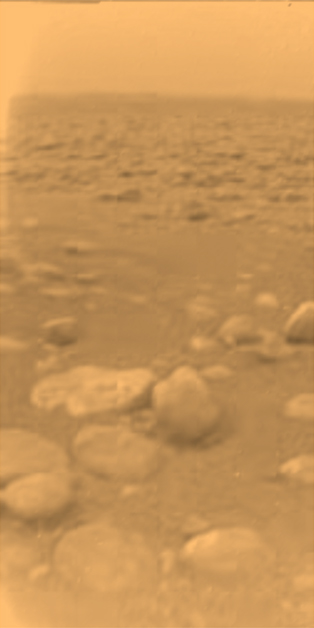
Surface of Saturn's moon Titan as seen by the Huygens probe after landing in 2005

The Huygens probe, carried to Saturn's moon Titan by Cassini, was specifically designed to survive landing on land or on liquid. It was thoroughly drop-tested to make sure it could withstand impact and continue functioning for at least three minutes. However, due to the low-speed impact, it continued providing data for more than two hours after it landed. The landing on Titan in 2005 was the first, and to date only, landing on any planet's satellite other than Earth's moon.

The proposed U.S. Titan Mare Explorer (TiME) mission considered a lander that would splash down in a lake in Titan's northern hemisphere and float on the surface of the lake for few months. Spain's proposed Titan Lake In-situ Sampling Propelled Explorer (TALISE) mission is similar to the TiME lander but has its own propulsion system for controlling shipping.

=== Comets and asteroids ===
Vesta, the multi-aimed Soviet mission, was developed in cooperation with European countries for realization in 1991–1994 but canceled due to the Soviet Union disbanding. It included a flyby of Mars, where Vesta would deliver an aerostat (balloon or airship) and small landers or penetrators, followed by flybys of Ceres or 4 Vesta and some other asteroids with the impact of a large penetrator on one of them.

The first landing on a small Solar System body (an object in the Solar System that is not a moon, planet, or dwarf planet) was performed in 2001 by the probe NEAR Shoemaker at asteroid 433 Eros despite the fact that NEAR was not originally designed to be capable of landing.

Japanese Hayabusa probe made several attempts to land on 25143 Itokawa in 2005 with mixed success, including a failed attempt to deploy a rover. Designed to rendezvous and land on a low-gravity body, Hayabusa became the second spacecraft to land on an asteroid, and in 2010 the first sample return mission from an asteroid.

The Rosetta probe, launched 2 March 2004, put the first robotic lander Philae on the comet Churyumov–Gerasimenko on 12 November 2014. Due to the extremely low gravity of such bodies, the landing system included a harpoon launcher intended to anchor a cable in the comet's surface and pull the lander down.

JAXA launched the Hayabusa2 asteroid space probe in 2014 to deliver several landing parts (including Minerva II and German Mobile Asteroid Surface Scout (MASCOT) landers and a Small Carry-on Impactor (SCI) penetrator) in 2018–2019 to return samples to Earth by 2020.

The Chinese Space Agency is designing a sample retrieval mission from Ceres that would take place during the 2020s.

=== Mercury ===
Launched in October 2018 and expected to reach Mercury in November 2026, ESA's BepiColombo mission to Mercury was originally designed to include the Mercury Surface Element (MSE). The lander would have carried a 7 kg payload consisting of an imaging system (a descent camera and a surface camera), a heat flow and physical properties package, an alpha particle X-ray spectrometer, a magnetometer, a seismometer, a soil penetrating device (mole), and a micro-rover. The MSE aspect of the mission was cancelled in 2003 due to budgetary constraints.

=== Moons of Jupiter ===
A few Jupiter probes provide many images and other data about its moons. Some proposed missions with landing on Jupiter's moons were canceled or not adopted. The small nuclear-powered Europa lander was proposed as part of NASA's Jupiter Icy Moons Orbiter (JIMO) mission that was canceled in 2006.

NASA's Europa Clipper is planned to explore Jupiter's moons, particularly Europa, starting in 2030. NASA considered a lander or impactor to fly alongside Europa Clipper, but ultimately declined. As Europa is hypothesized to have water beneath its icy surface, these missions are sent to investigate its habitability and assess its astrobiological potential by confirming the existence of water on the moon and determining the water's characteristics.

== Impactors ==
The collision of comet 9P/Tempel and the Deep Impact probe

=== Deep Space 2 ===
The Deep Space 2 impactor probe was to be the first spacecraft to penetrate below the surface of another planet. However, the mission failed with the loss of its mother ship, Mars Polar Lander, which lost communication with Earth during entry into Mars' atmosphere on 3 December 1999.

=== Deep Impact ===
Comet Tempel 1 was visited by NASA's Deep Impact probe on 4 July 2005. The impact crater formed was approximately 200 m wide and 30–50 m deep, and scientists detected the presence of silicates, carbonates, smectite, amorphous carbon and polycyclic aromatic hydrocarbons.

=== Moon Impact Probe ===
The Moon Impact Probe (MIP) developed by the Indian Space Research Organisation (ISRO), India's national space agency, was a lunar probe that was released on 14 November 2008 by ISRO's Chandrayaan-1 lunar remote sensing orbiter. Chandrayaan-1 was launched on 22 October 2008. It led to the discovery of the presence of water on the Moon.

=== LCROSS ===
The Lunar Crater Observation and Sensing Satellite (LCROSS) was a robotic spacecraft operated by NASA to perform a lower-cost means of determining the nature of hydrogen detected at the polar regions of the Moon. The main LCROSS mission objective was to explore the presence of water ice in a permanently shadowed crater near a lunar polar region. LCROSS was launched together with the Lunar Reconnaissance Orbiter (LRO) on 18 June 2009, as part of the shared Lunar Precursor Robotic Program. LCROSS was designed to collect and relay data from the impact and debris plume resulting from the launch vehicle's spent Centaur upper rocket stage striking the crater Cabeus near the south pole of the Moon. Centaur impacted successfully on 9 October 2009, at 11:31 UTC. The "shepherding spacecraft" (carrying the LCROSS mission payload) descended through Centaur's plume of debris, and collected and relayed data before impacting six minutes later at 11:37 UTC. The project was successful in discovering water in Cabeus.

=== MESSENGER ===
The NASA MESSENGER (Mercury Surface, Space Environment, Geochemistry, and Ranging) mission to Mercury launched on 3 August 2004 and entered orbit around the planet on 18 March 2011. Following a mapping mission, MESSENGER was directed to impact Mercury's surface on 30 April 2015. The spacecraft's impact with Mercury occurred near 3:26 pm EDT on 30 April 2015, leaving a crater estimated to be 16 m in diameter.

=== AIDA ===
The ESA's AIDA mission concept would investigate the effects of impact crashing a spacecraft into an asteroid. The DART spacecraft impacted asteroid 65803 Didymos's moon Dimorphos in 2022, and the Hera spacecraft will arrive in 2027 to investigate the effects of the impact.

== See also ==
- List of artificial objects on the Moon
- List of artificial objects on Mars
- List of artificial objects on Venus
