= Metabolite =

Intermediate or end product of metabolism

In biochemistry, a metabolite is an intermediate or end product of metabolism. The term is usually used for small molecules. Metabolites have various functions, including fuel, structure, signaling, stimulatory and inhibitory effects on enzymes, catalytic activity of their own (usually as a cofactor to an enzyme), defense, and interactions with other organisms (e.g. pigments, odorants, and pheromones).

A primary metabolite is directly involved in normal "growth", development, and reproduction. Ethylene exemplifies a primary metabolite produced large-scale by industrial microbiology.

A secondary metabolite is not directly involved in those processes, but usually has an important ecological function. Examples include antibiotics and pigments such as resins and terpenes etc.

Some antibiotics use primary metabolites as precursors, such as actinomycin, which is created from the primary metabolite tryptophan. Some sugars are metabolites, such as fructose or glucose, which are both present in the metabolic pathways.

Examples of primary metabolites produced by industrial microbiology include:

Class	Example
Alcohol	Ethanol
Amino acids	Glutamic acid, aspartic acid
Nucleotides	Guanosine monophosphate
Antioxidants	Isoascorbic acid
Organic acids	Acetic acid, lactic acid
Polyols	Glycerol
Vitamins	Riboflavin

The metabolome forms a large network of metabolic reactions, where outputs from one enzymatic chemical reaction are inputs to other chemical reactions.

Metabolites from chemical compounds, whether inherent or pharmaceutical, form as part of the natural biochemical process of degrading and eliminating the compounds. The rate of degradation of a compound is an important determinant of the duration and intensity of its action. Understanding how pharmaceutical compounds are metabolized and the potential side effects of their metabolites is an important part of drug discovery.

== See also ==
- Antimetabolite
- Intermediary metabolism, also called intermediate metabolism
- Metabolic control analysis
- Metabolomics, the study of global metabolite profiles in a system (cell, tissue, or organism) under a given set of conditions
- Metabolic pathway
- Volatile organic compound
