= Titan Submarine =

Proposed NASA submarine to land on Titan

- Artist's depiction of the submarine
- Mission type: Reconnaissance and submarine
- Operator: NASA

Spacecraft properties
- Dry mass: 500 kg
- Dimensions: 20 by 6.5 ft

Start of mission
- Launch date: 2030s–2040s

End of mission
- Landing date: 2040–2045
- Landing site: Kraken Mare or Ligeia Mare

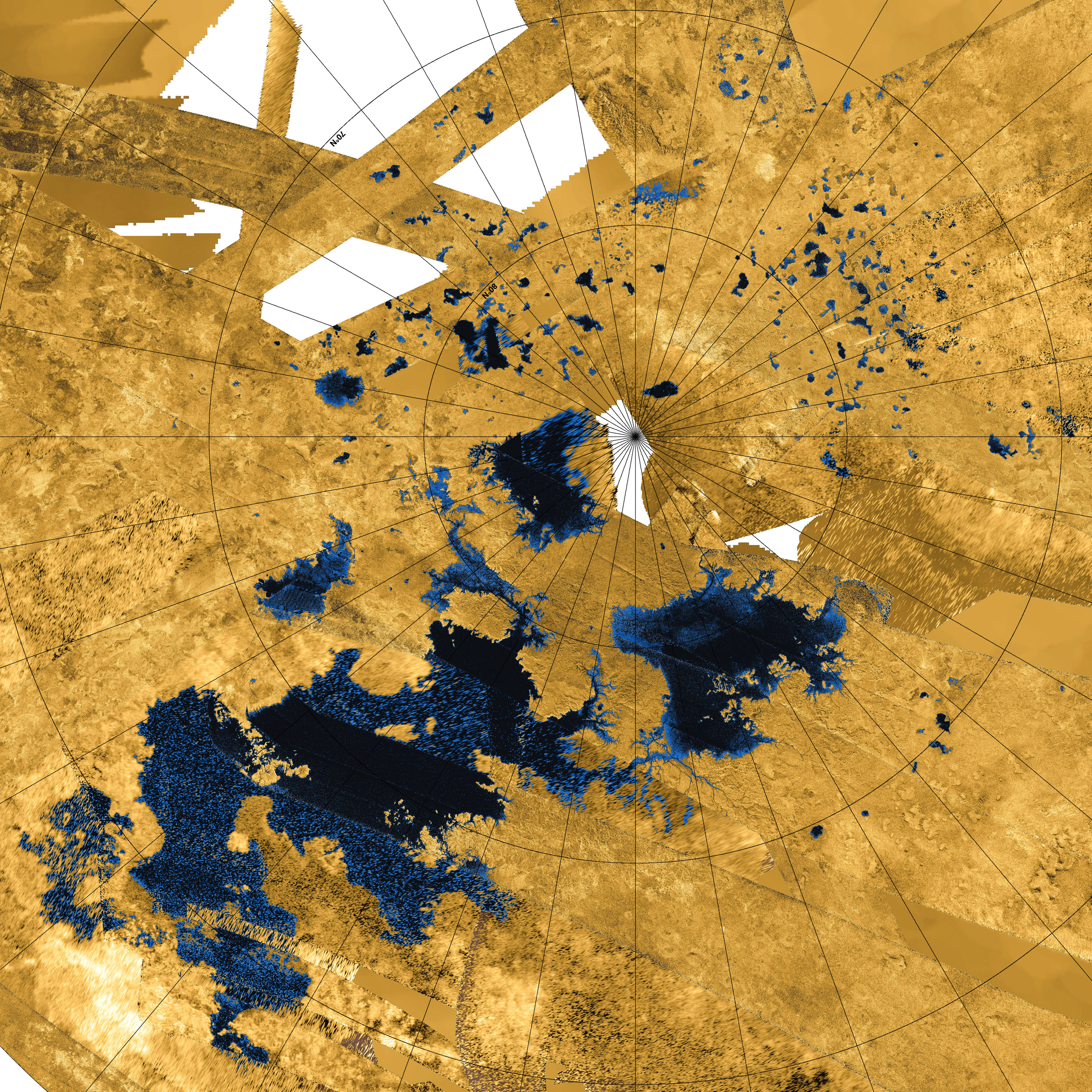
Synthetic aperture radar mosaic of Titan's north polar region showing Titans largest lakes Kraken Mare, Ligeia Mare, and Punga Mare

Titan Submarine is a proposed unmanned NASA submarine probe that will visit Saturn's largest moon Titan, and will explore either Kraken Mare or Ligeia Mare, two of Titan's lakes. The concept was proposed by Steven Oleson, Ralph Lorenz, and Micheal Paul, technical experts at the Glenn Research Center in Ohio.

== History ==
In early 2005, studies conducted by the Cassini-Huygens probe revealed organic compounds in the atmosphere of Titan. Additionally, during its 2-hour descent, Huygens provided data about Titan's atmosphere, with information suggesting a functioning climate system, water cycle, and the presence of organic matter and molecules.

On July 22, 2006, the Cassini-Huygens probe conducted a flyby of Titan, passing at a distance of 148,000 km. The flyby revealed methane lakes on the surface of Titan, providing evidence of the existence of liquid water, a hypothesis first suggested by a Hubble Space Telescope observation of Titan in 1995.

Following these discoveries, the Institute for Advanced Concepts proposed the Titan Mare Explorer and the Titan Submarine. However, the proposals were superseded in a 2012 vote by the InSight lander, which was tasked with studying the core of Mars. However, both projects remain active under the auspices of NIAC.

The Titan Submarine initiated Phase I in 2014 and transitioned to Phase II, dubbed "Titan Turtle", in November 2020. The Titan Submarine is still under development by NIAC.

== Overview ==
The submarine will be launched aboard an Atlas V rocket, accompanied by a Boeing X-37, which is designed to withstand the climate of Titan.

The Titan Submarine will be equipped with radioisotope rockets, a type of thermal rocket that uses decaying radioactive elements, to propel the submarine for longer durations on Titan while conserving power on the probe. Radioisotope rockets utilize isotopes such as polonium-210 or plutonium-238, each of which have a half-life of approximately 138 days or 80 years respectively (plutonium-238 provides a stable output over a much longer span whereas polonium-210 provides 250 times more thermal energy but for a far shorter lifespan). It will also be equipped with a sampler to collect samples of lakebed minerals and liquid methane and ethane hydrocarbons from the water on Titan. Additionally, a camera will be attached to the front of the vessel.

== Scientific goals ==
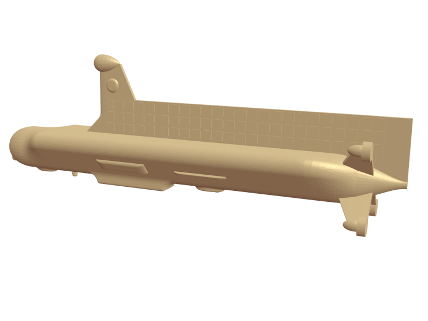
Model of the Titan Submarine

The submarine will aid scientists in refining models and simulations of undersea activity on Titan. It will contribute to the detection of elemental and chemical properties of the water, as well as undersea rocks and minerals. Additionally, it may help identify undersea seismic activity on Titan. The submarine will also collect data on the depth and temperature of specific locations within lakes.

Additionally, theories propose the existence of a global subsurface ocean beneath Titan's surface. The mission aims to enhance understanding of subsurface oceans and explain the dramatic shifts in Titan's surface features. It may also provide insights into the impact of subsurface oceans on the geology beneath and above Titan's seas.

During certain parts of the mission, the submarine will partially emerge from the water to study the weather, tides, coastlines, and the unsolved observation surrounding disappearing islands or icebergs on Titan.

== Instruments ==
=== Instrument list ===
- Liquid samplers
- Surface imager
- Depth sounder
- Weather sounder
- Side-scan sonar arrays

==== Interior instruments ====
- Command and data handling
- Communications
- Altitude determination and control

==== Proposed instruments ====
- Seafloor sample analyzer
- Ventral imager

==== Energy ====
The submarine will be equipped with 840 W of:

- Isotope power systems
- Stirling radioisotope generator
- 2 eight-GPHS SRG (chosen as the baseline power system proving 900 W of DC power)

== Further information ==
- YouTube video gives an illustration on how the variety of instruments on board the submarine work.
