= List of artificial objects on Venus =

The following table is a partial list of artificial objects on the surface of the planet Venus. They have been abandoned after having served their purpose. The list does not include smaller objects such as parachutes or heatshields.

1	Landed
2	Crashed(accidental)
3	Crashed(On-Purpose/Post-Mission)
4	Active

== List of artificial objects on Venus ==
Artificial object	Image	Country	Landing date	Landing mass	Coordinates	Stats
Venera 3		Soviet Academy of Sciences; Soviet Union	March 1, 1966	377 kg (831 lb) (Note: The exact location of fall is unknown.)	20°N 80°E	2
Venera 4		Soviet Academy of Sciences; Soviet Union	October 18, 1967	377 kg (831 lb)	19°N 38°E	2
Venera 5		Soviet Academy of Sciences; Soviet Union	May 16, 1969	410 kg (900 lb)	3°S 18°E	2
Venera 6		Soviet Academy of Sciences; Soviet Union	May 17, 1969	410 kg (900 lb)	5°S 23°E	2
Venera 7		Soviet Academy of Sciences; Soviet Union	December 15, 1970	500 kg (1,100 lb)	5°S 351°E	1
Venera 8 Lander		Soviet Academy of Sciences; Soviet Union	July 22, 1972	495 kg (1,091 lb)	10°42′S 335°15′E	1
Venera 9 Lander		Soviet Academy of Sciences; Soviet Union	October 22, 1975	1,560 kg (3,440 lb)	31°00′36″N 291°38′24″E	1
Venera 10; Lander		Soviet Academy of Sciences; Soviet Union	October 25, 1975	1,560 kg (3,440 lb)	15°25′12″N 291°30′36″E	1
Pioneer Venus Multiprobe; Bus		NASA; United States	December 9, 1978	290 kg (640 lb)	37°09′S 290°09′E	3
Pioneer Venus Large Probe		NASA; United States	December 9, 1978	316 kg (697 lb)	04°04′N 304°00′E	1
Pioneer Venus Small Probe North		NASA; United States	December 9, 1978	90 kg (200 lb)	59°03′N 04°08′E	3
Pioneer Venus Small Probe Day		NASA; United States	December 9, 1978	90 kg (200 lb)	31°03′S 317°00′E	3
Pioneer Venus Small Probe Night		NASA; United States	December 9, 1978	90 kg (200 lb)	28°07′S 56°07′E	1
Venera 11; Lander		Soviet Academy of Sciences; Soviet Union	December 25, 1978	760 kg (1,680 lb)	14°S 299°E	1
Venera 12; Lander		Soviet Academy of Sciences; Soviet Union	December 21, 1978	760 kg (1,680 lb)	07°S 294°E	1
Venera 13; Lander		Soviet Academy of Sciences; Soviet Union	March 1, 1982	760 kg (1,680 lb)	07°05′S 303°00′E	1
Venera 14; Lander		Soviet Academy of Sciences; Soviet Union	March 5, 1982	760 kg (1,680 lb)	13°25′S 310°00′E	1
Vega 1 Descent unit		Soviet Academy of Sciences; Soviet Union	June 11, 1985	1,520 kg (3,350 lb)	07°05′N 177°07′E (Note: It is not known how much further the balloon traveled after the final communication.)	3
Vega 1 Balloon gondola		Soviet Academy of Sciences; Soviet Union	June 12, 1985	6.9 kg (15 lb)	08°01′N 68°08′E	3
Vega 2 Descent unit		Soviet Academy of Sciences; Soviet Union	June 15, 1985	1,520 kg (3,350 lb)	08°05′S 177°07′E	3
Vega 2 Balloon gondola		Soviet Academy of Sciences; Soviet Union	June 17, 1985	6.9 kg (15 lb)	07°05′S 76°03′E|	3
Pioneer Venus Orbiter		NASA; United States	October 22, 1992	517 kg (1,140 lb)		3
Magellan		NASA; United States	October 13, 1994	1,035 kg (2,282 lb)		3
Venus Express		European Space Agency	January / February 2015 (Note: The exact time of atmospheric entry is unknown.)	700 kg (1,500 lb)		3
Total estimated mass				15,234 kg (33,585 lb)		

== See also ==
- List of artificial objects on extra-terrestrial surfaces
- Timeline of planetary exploration
