= Primary metabolite =

All metabolites involved in growth

A primary metabolite is a kind of metabolite that is directly involved in normal growth, development, and reproduction. It usually performs a physiological function in the organism (i.e. an intrinsic function). A primary metabolite is typically present in many organisms or cells. It is also referred to as a central metabolite, which has an even more restricted meaning (present in any autonomously growing cell or organism). Some common examples of primary metabolites include:

Class	Example
Alcohols	Ethanol, prenol
Amino acids	Glutamic acid, aspartic acid
Nucleotides	Guanosine monophosphate
Antioxidants	Erythorbic acid
Organic acids	Acetic acid, lactic acid
Polyols	Glycerol
Vitamins	Riboflavin, biotin

Note that primary metabolites do not show any pharmacological actions or effects.

Plant growth regulators may be classified as both primary and secondary metabolites due to their role in plant growth and development. Some of them are intermediates between primary and secondary metabolism.

== See also ==
- Antimetabolite
- Metabolic control analysis, a specific kind of control analysis
- Metabolism
- Metabolomics — the study of global metabolites profile in a system (cell, tissue, or organism) under a given set of conditions
- Metabolome
- Metabolic intermediate
