= Titan Lake In-situ Sampling Propelled Explorer =

Proposed space mission

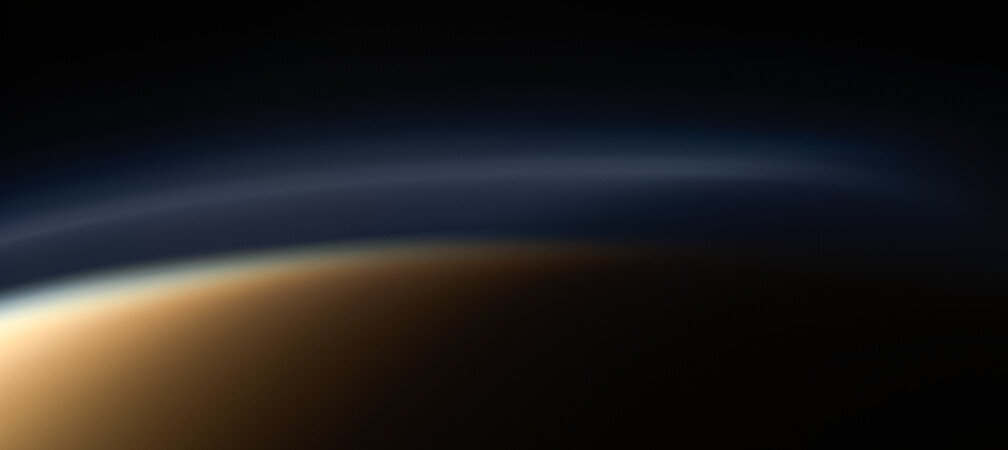
- A wide angle of Titan's atmosphere.
- Mission type: Titan Lander
- Operator: ESA
- Mission duration: Up to 1 year (planned)

Spacecraft properties
- Spacecraft type: Lander

End of mission
- Landing site: Ligeia Mare

Titan Lake In-situ Sampling Propelled Explorer (TALISE) is a Spanish space probe proposed in 2012 that would splash-down in Ligeia Mare, the second largest lake on Saturn's moon Titan. TALISE would navigate across the lake for six months to one year.

Had this mission been approved by the European Space Agency (ESA), it would have analyzed the liquid hydrocarbons sea and take scientific measurements while it navigates to the coast in the northern region of Titan. It is also proposed in the mission to study the surrounding terrain of Ligeia Mare. This mission proposal was a joined project between the Spanish Astrobiology Center and SENER.

== Naming ==
"Talise" is the Iroquois word for "beautiful water."

== See also ==
- Exploration of Titan
  - Dragonfly, a proposed Titan lander and rotorcraft
  - Explorer of Enceladus and Titan (E^{2}T)
  - Journey to Enceladus and Titan (JET)
  - Titan Mare Explorer
  - Titan Saturn System Mission
