= Ligeia Mare =

Sea on Titan

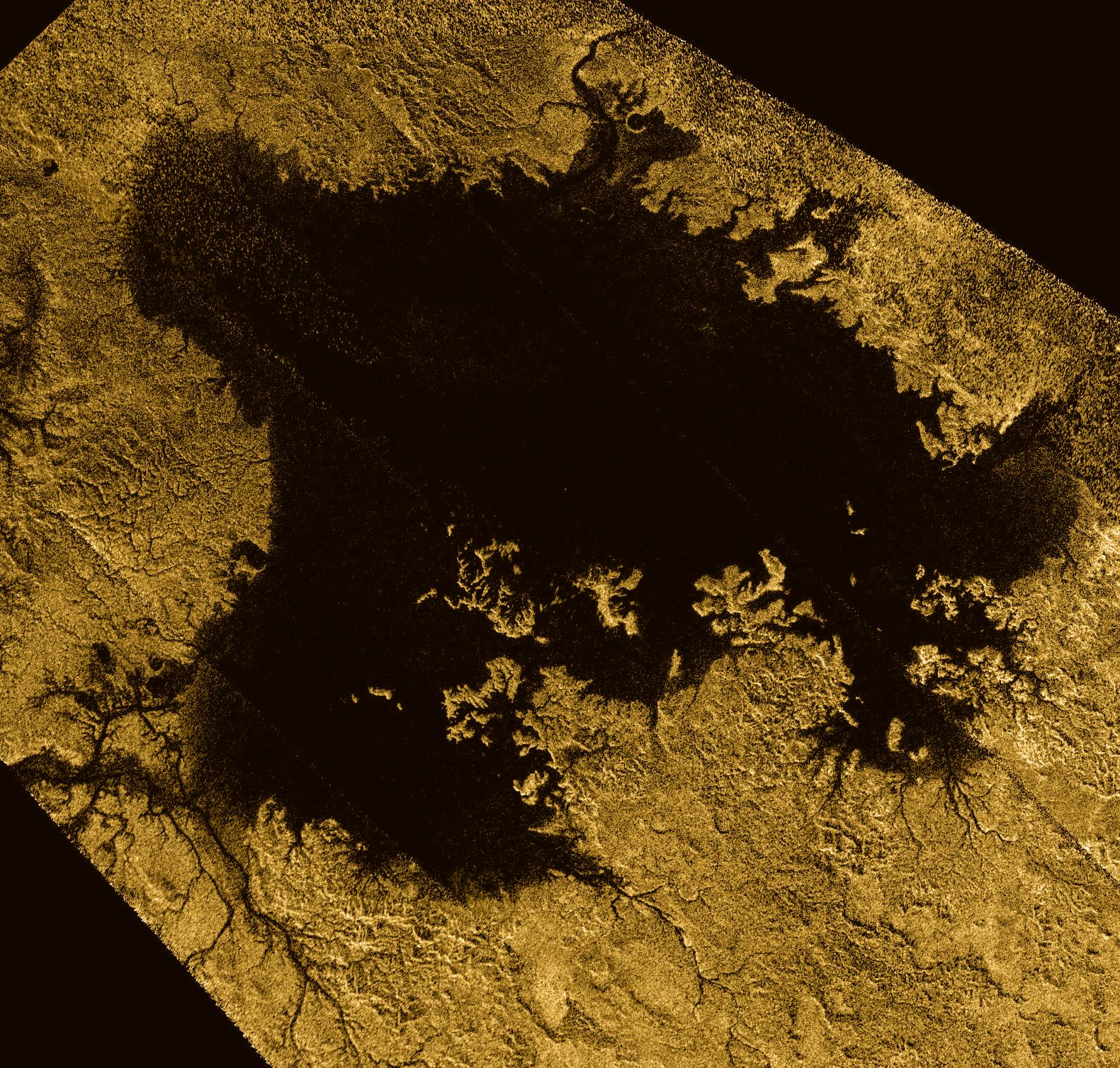
- Ligeia Mare from a false-color mosaic of synthetic aperture radar images of Titan's north polar region.
- Feature type: Mare
- Coordinates: 79°N 248°W
- Diameter: 500 km (Note: The USGS web site gives the size as a "diameter", but it is actually the length in the longest dimension.)
- Inflow: Vid Flumina, Xanthus Flumen, Kokytos Flumen, Gihon Flumen
- Eponym: Ligeia

Ligeia Mare /laɪˈdʒiːə ˈmɑːreɪ/ is a lake in the north polar region of Titan, the planet Saturn's largest moon. It is the second largest body of liquid on the surface of Titan, after Kraken Mare. Larger than Lake Superior on Earth, it is mostly composed of liquid methane. It is also the third largest lake in the solar system, with unknown but lesser components of dissolved nitrogen and ethane, as well as other organic compounds. It is located at 78° N, 249° W, and has been fully imaged by the Cassini spacecraft. Measuring roughly 420 km (260 mi) by 350 km (217 mi) across, it has a surface area of about 126,000 km^{2}, and a shoreline over 2,000 km (1,240 mi) in length. The lake may be hydrologically connected to the larger Kraken Mare. Its namesake is Ligeia, one of the sirens in Greek mythology.

== Description ==
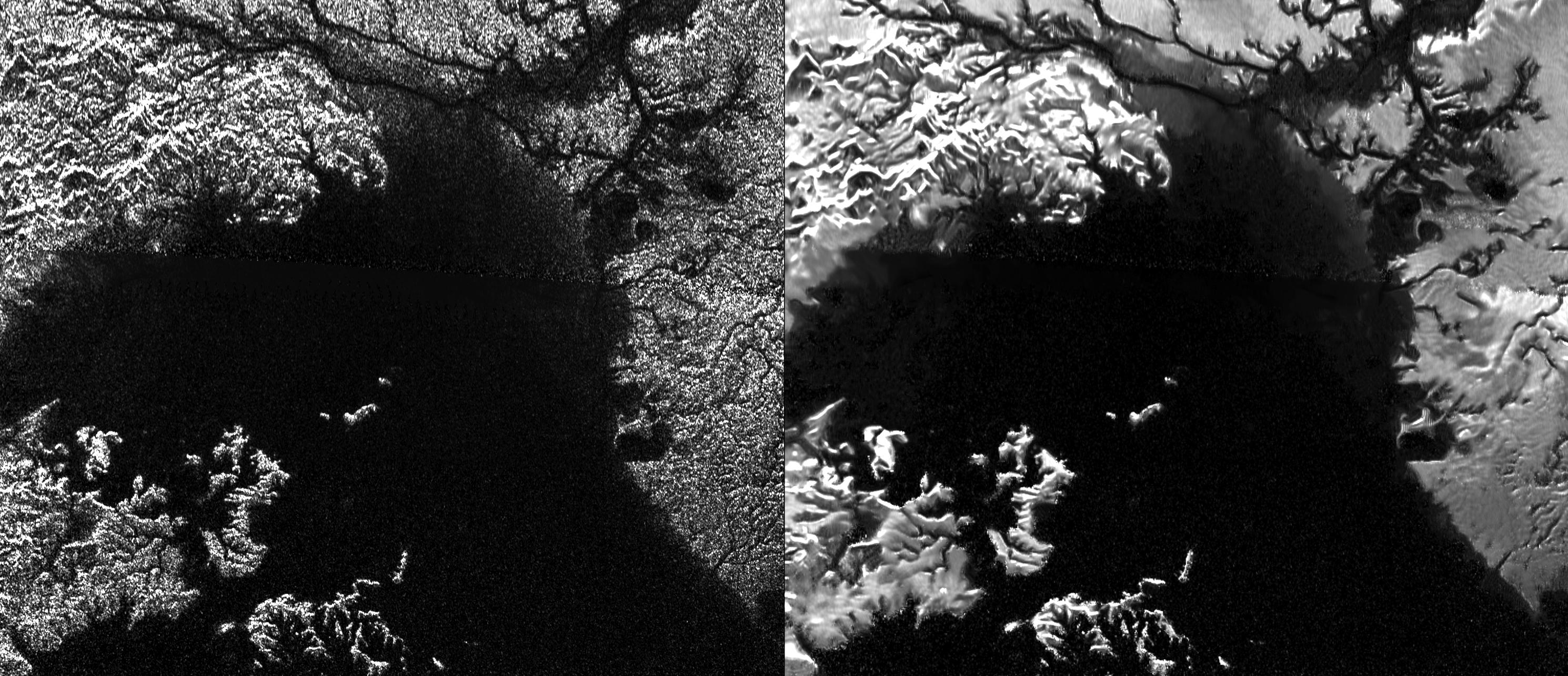
Titan – Ligeia Mare – SAR and clearer despeckled views.

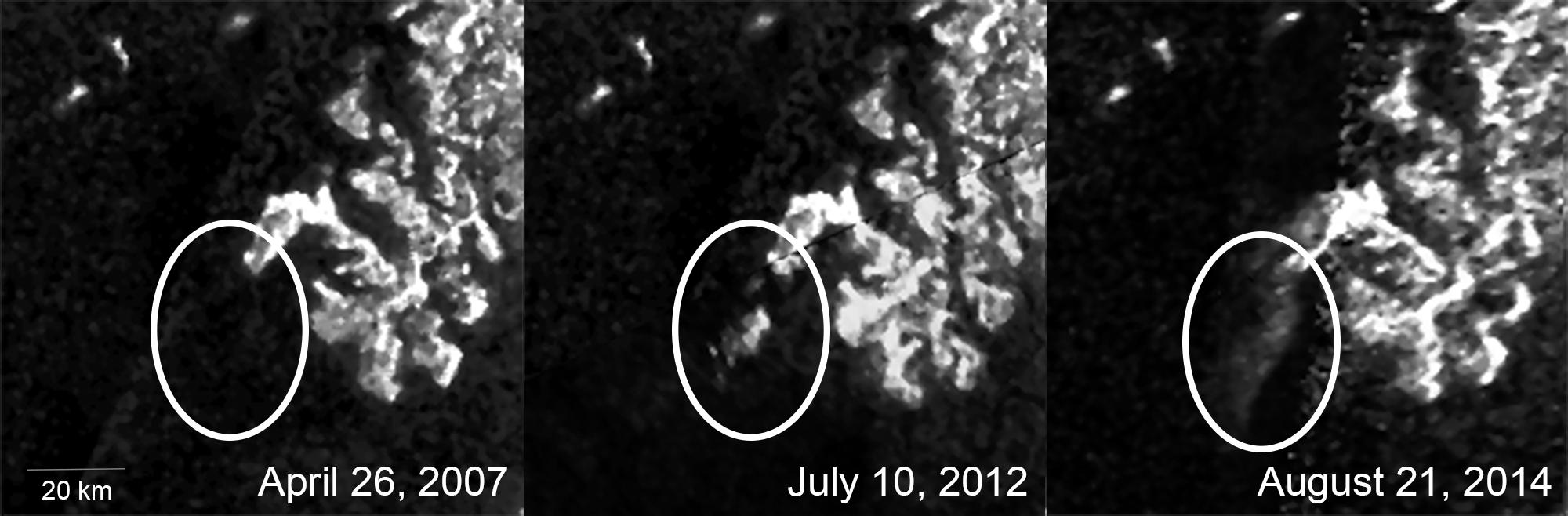
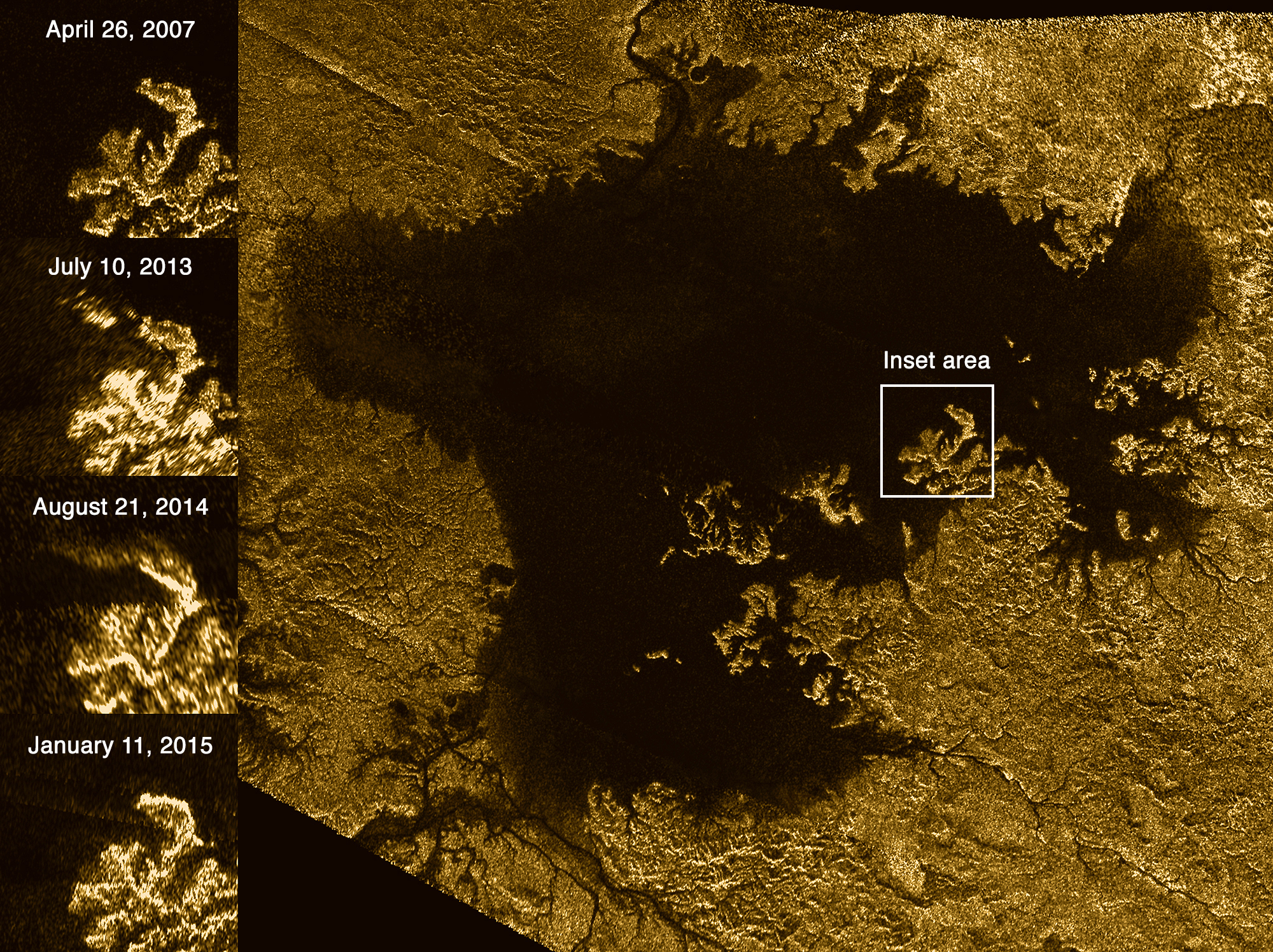
Evolving feature in Ligeia Mare

Ligeia Mare has two predominant types of coastline, "crenulated" and "subdued". The former is characterized by hummocky, eroded terrain, the latter by lower, smoother topography and the presence of more numerous and longer channels. Crenulated terrain predominates on the eastern and southern sides of the lake; subdued terrain to the west and north. Except in the southeast where the rough topography extends to the coast, hummocky terrain tends to be separated from the shoreline by a more subdued bench. The coast has numerous bays that appear to be flooded river mouths (rias), and unlike at Ontario Lacus there are no visible subaerial delta deposits, possible evidence of a recent sea level rise. In the northeast and northwest sections of the mare, along about a quarter of the total shoreline, there are extensive areas where the depth is less than 5 m, shallow enough for imaging radar to penetrate to the bottom. 2013 radar measurements by Cassini indicate parts of the lake are 170 m deep which implies the liquid must be very pure methane since the radar signal was able to pass right through it. The surface of the lake appears very smooth on radar; it is flat within a few millimeters, suggesting very light surface winds.

The average depth is on the order of 50 m, while the maximum depth is probably over 200 m. The total volume is likely to be greater than 7,000 km^{3}.

== Hydrology ==
The reasons for Ligeia Mare's nearly pure methane composition are still not entirely clear. Until studies showed otherwise, it had been assumed that ethane would be the primary constituent of Titan's seas, as it is produced in Titan's upper atmosphere by the following reaction:

2 CH_{4} → H_{2} + C_{2}H_{6}

The lack of ethane is an open question awaiting further investigation. Theories include it migrating into the undersea crust or perhaps into Kraken Mare, whose composition has as of yet not been as well studied. In the latter case, ethane-poor liquid hydrocarbon would be the equivalent of terrestrial freshwater (Titanian precipitation is mainly methane).

In addition to ethane, Titan's atmosphere produces a wide range of more complex photochemical products, such as nitriles and benzene. These are believed to precipitate out and flow into Titan's seas. Radar data suggests that Ligeia Mare's seabed is likely covered in a thick layer of these organic compounds.

Temperature readings from the shoreline of Ligeia Mare suggest that it is porous and highly saturated with hydrocarbons. The shorelines of Ligeia Mare and other north polar lakes and maria have been stable over the period of observation by Cassini, in contrast to south polar Ontario Lacus, where there has been significant shoreline recession. However, transient phenomena have been observed including a 260 square kilometre feature dubbed "Magic Island" by Cassini scientists. The "Magic Island" area only appeared in 2014 and may be waves, bubbles or subsurface ice rising to the surface as the lake warms up during spring, or possibly silt like material suspended in the liquid hydrocarbon sea.

== Proposed missions ==
The Titan Mare Explorer (TiME) is a lake-lander proposed in 2009 to splash down on and then drift about the lake. It was selected for a Phase-A design study in 2011 as a candidate mission for the 12th NASA Discovery Program opportunity, but was not selected for flight.

The Titan Lake In-situ Sampling Propelled Explorer (TALISE) was a conceptual design study for a Spanish lander mission envisioned to splash down and navigate across Ligeia Mare.

In 2015, the NASA Innovative Advanced Concepts program (NIAC) awarded a Phase II grant to a design study of a submarine to explore the seas of Titan.

== Gallery ==
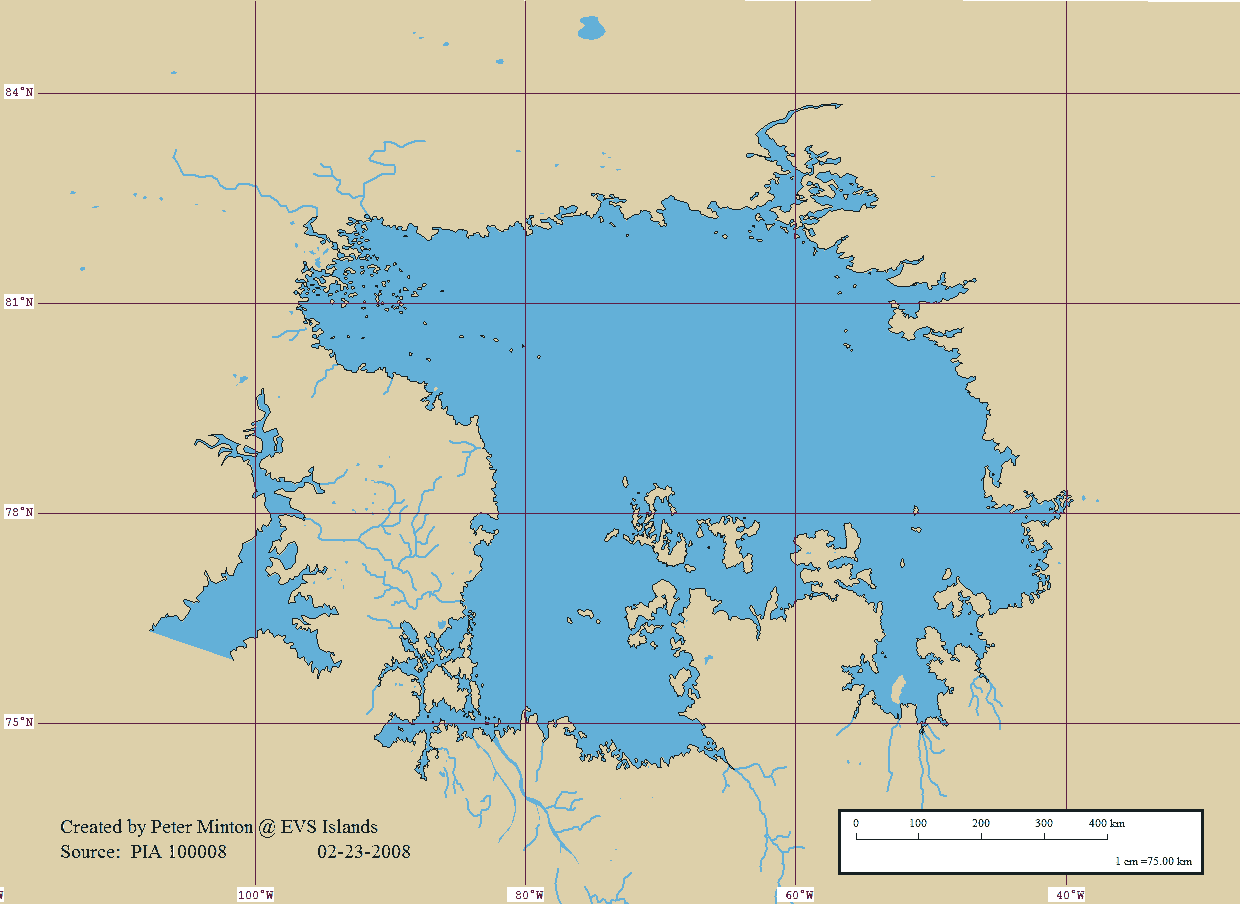
Map of Ligeia Mare by an amateur cartographer

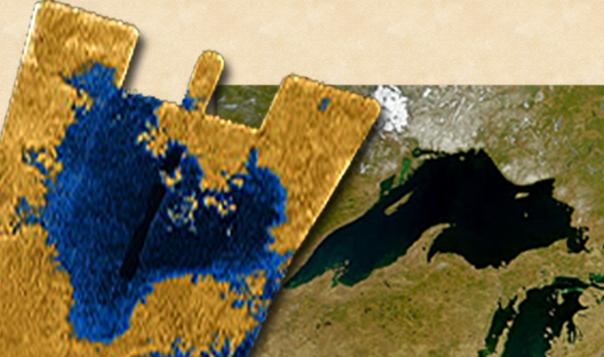
Comparison of Ligeia Mare's size with that of Lake Superior on Earth

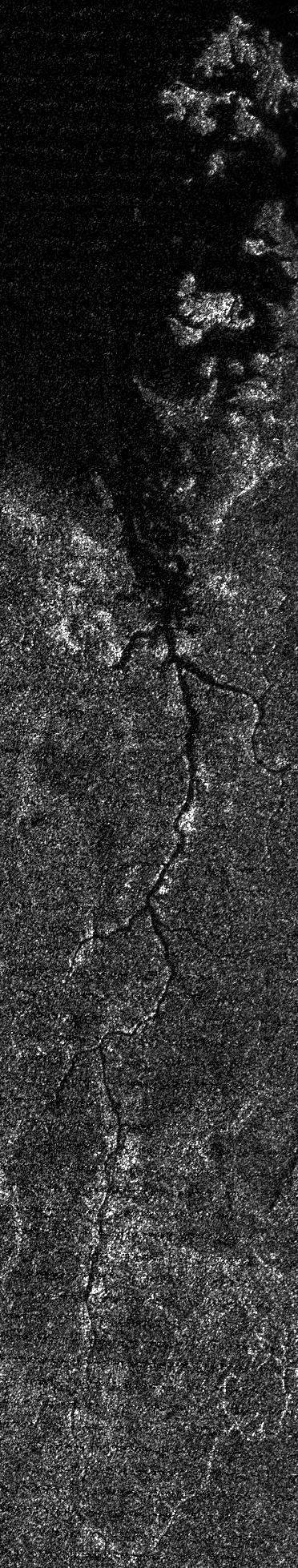
Vid Flumina, a river over 400 km long that empties into Ligeia Mare

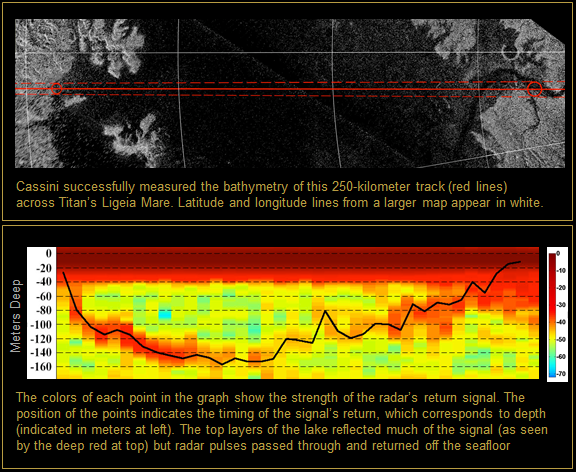
The Cassini spacecraft's Titan Radar Mapper produced bathymetric measurements of Titan's Ligeia Mare
