= Ahmakiq Undae =

Dune fields on Titan

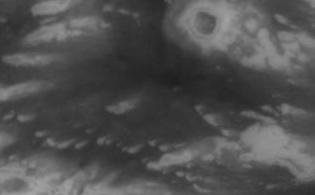
- A radar image of Ahmakiq Undae created by combining imagery from the Cassini space probe taken on 31 August 2007 and 5 January 2008. The crater in the upper right is Selk.
- Feature type: Sand dune field
- Location: Titan
- Coordinates: 2.22°N 202.7°W
- Diameter: 812 kilometres (505 mi)
- Eponym: Ahmakiq

Ahmakiq Undae is a massive undae, or dune field, on Saturn's largest moon, Titan. It is located at Titan's equator and is the future initial landing site of the Dragonfly probe.

== Naming ==
Ahmakiq Undae is named after Ahmakiq, one of the wind gods in Maya mythology. According to NASA, the Mayas prayed to Ahmakiq to stop strong winds from destroying their crops.

All dune fields on Titan are named after deities from mythologies who are associated with wind and the air, in accordance with the naming convention established by the International Astronomical Union (IAU). The IAU approved the name for Ahmakiq Undae on 13 April 2026.

== Location ==
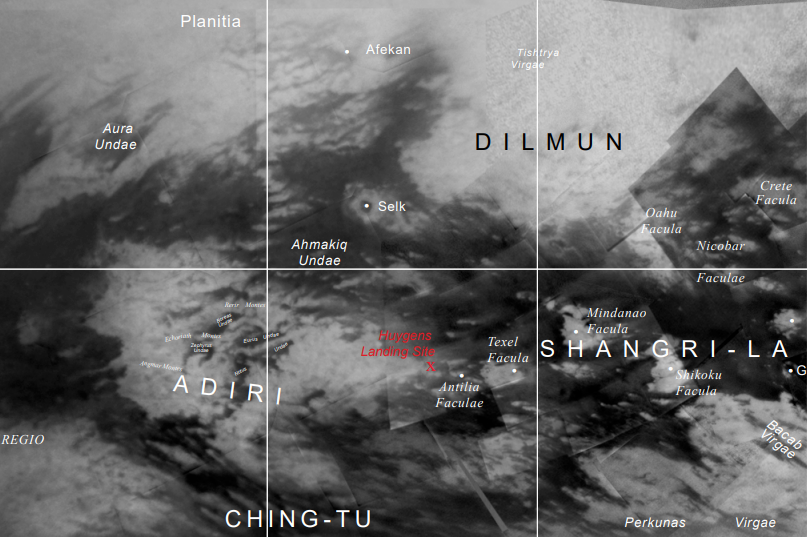
A map of the surroundings of Ahmakiq Undae.

Ahmakiq Undae is located at Titan's equator. It is surrounded by several albedo features, including the bright Adiri region to the southwest, the bright Dilmun region to the northeast, and the dark Shangri-La region to the east.

The most notable surface feature near Ahmakiq Undae is Selk, one of the few well-defined craters on Titan.

The mountain range Mindolluin Montes marks the southern boundary of Ahmakiq Undae, while a smaller, less-defined crater called Mystis straddles its eastern boundary.

The Huygens lander landed several kilometers southeast of Ahmakiq Undae.

In addition, as a result of Titan's synchronous rotation during its orbit around its parent planet, Ahmakiq Undae is located on the hemisphere of Titan that never faces Saturn. As a result, an observer at Ahmakiq Undae would never see Saturn in the sky. (Note: For moons in synchronous rotation, such as Titan, 0° longitude corresponds to the part of the surface that always faces Saturn. Regions between 90° W and 0° and between 0° and 270° W longitude always face the moon's parent planet.)

== Geology ==
Ahmakiq Undae is one of Titan's ubiquitous sand dune fields. In terms of shape and structure, sand dunes on Titan resemble sand dunes on Earth. The dunes on both worlds were created through the movement of wind, but the dunes on the two bodies are made of different materials. While sand on Earth is composed mostly of silicate materials such as quartz, the "sand" on Titan is made mostly of hydrocarbon organic substances ground into grains resembling dry coffee grounds. Similarly, sand on Earth is usually ground down and smoothed out mostly by water, while on Titan, sandy materials are shaped mostly by liquid methane and organic compounds rather than liquid water.

== Discovery and exploration ==
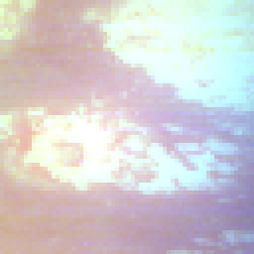
An image of Selk crater and Ahmakiq Undae (lower left), obtained using Cassini's VIMS in December 2007.

The Cassini probe discovered Ahmakiq Undae during its several flybys of Titan as it orbited Saturn from 2004 to 2017. Titan's thick and opaque atmosphere prevented probes that previously visited Titan like Voyager 1 from seeing the moon's surface in visible light. Cassini instead mapped Titan's surface using radar that can penetrate its thick hazes.

Cassini produced radar images of Ahmakiq Undae during its T35 flyby in late August 2007, T38 flyby in December 2007, and T40 flyby in January 2008.

=== Future exploration ===
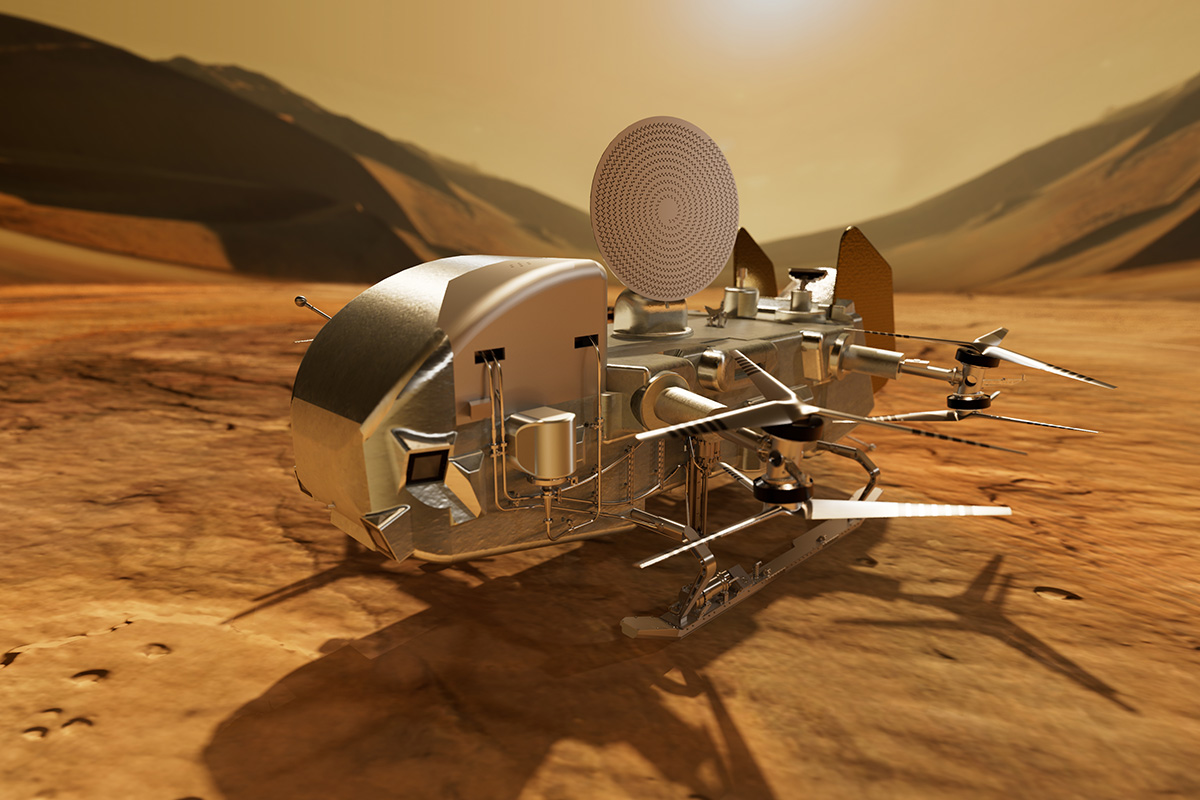
The Dragonfly space probe will land on the dunes of Ahmakiq Undae in 2034.

The Johns Hopkins Applied Physics Laboratory (JHU-APL) chose Ahmakiq Undae as the first landing site for the Dragonfly drone probe in September 2026. JHU-APL specifically chose this region on Titan because it is close to the major crater Selk, and it is strongly believed that Ahmakiq Undae contains material that was excavated and ejected by the impact that created Selk. Preliminary analyses of Selk crater revealed that liquid water and complex organic materials, which are key ingredients for life, once coexisted in the crater.

Planetary scientists are particularly interested in studying ejected material from the interior of Titan because it might contain clues about the existence of an ocean or slush layer beneath the moon's crust.

The probe is expected to land on Ahmakiq Undae in 2034.
