= Ralph Lorenz =

Planetary scientist

Ralph D. Lorenz is a planetary scientist and engineer at the Johns Hopkins Applied Physics Lab. whose research focuses on understanding surfaces, atmospheres, and their interactions on planetary bodies, especially Titan, Venus, Mars, and Earth. He currently serves as Mission Architect of Dragonfly, NASA's fourth selected New Frontiers mission, and as participating scientist on Akatsuki and InSight. He is a Co-Investigator on the SuperCam instrument on the Perseverance rover, responsible for interpreting data from its microphone. He leads the Venus Atmospheric Structure Investigation on the DAVINCI Discovery mission to Venus. He is the recipient of the 2020 International Planetary Probe Workshop (IPPW) Al Seiff memorial award, and the 2022 American Geophysical Union's Fred Whipple Award for contributions to planetary science.

== Education ==
Lorenz earned a B.Eng. in Aerospace Systems Engineering from the University of Southampton (UK) Department of Aeronautics and Astronautics in 1990. For his thesis "Exploring the Surface of Titan", Lorenz was awarded a PhD in Space Sciences from the University of Kent at Canterbury in 1994. Lorenz spent 1994-2006 at the University of Arizona as a postdoctoral fellow and research scientist. In 2006, he joined the Johns Hopkins Applied Physics Lab.

== Research ==
Lorenz has published over 200 papers on spacecraft exploration of several bodies of the Solar System, using scientific instruments and housekeeping data from engineering systems (such as observing the Mars environment and a transit of Deimos via the solar array currents on the InSight lander or measuring the dust and gas in the plumes of Enceladus using Cassini's attitude control system). He has conducted field research on dust devils, sand dunes and volcanos, exploiting techniques such as kite-borne, timelapse and near-infrared photography. He has also published on the dynamics of Frisbees, the thermodynamics of the drinking bird toy, and the moving rocks ("Sailing Stones") of Racetrack Playa in Death Valley. He documented the migration of sand dunes at the Mos Espa film set in Tunisia, seen on the Star Wars movies. His contributions in scientific history include noting the calculations of Edmond Halley on the size of wings needed for human flight, and the definition of the circumstellar habitable zone by Edward Maunder.

Lorenz has participated in several NASA and ESA missions. He was a Young Graduate Trainee for ESA's Huygens from 1990-1991 and continued on as a member of the Huygens Science Team, designing and building its penetrometer instrument. As a member of the Cassini RADAR team, Lorenz led the planning of Titan radar observations during Cassini's 13 year mission in the Saturn system. Lorenz was selected as a participating scientist on the Japanese mission Akatsuki in 2010 and NASA's InSight mission at Mars in 2017.

He has also been involved in numerous mission concepts, including the Titan Mare Explorer (TiME), the "Billion Dollar Box" Saturnian system study, Titan Airship Explorer, AVIATR, a Mars meteorology and seismology concept, and a Titan submarine.

== Books ==
Title	Authors	Publisher	Date	ISBN
Planetary Exploration with Ingenuity and Dragonfly: Rotary-Wing Flight on Mars and Titan	Ralph Lorenz	American Institute of Aeronautics and Astronautics	2022	978-1624106366
Saturn's Moon Titan Owners' Workshop Manual	Ralph Lorenz	Haynes	2020	978-1785216435
Exploring Planetary Climate	R.D. Lorenz	Cambridge University Press	2019	978-1108471541
Dust Devils	D. Reiss, R. D. Lorenz, M. Balme, L. Neakrase, A. Pio Rossi, A. Spiga, and J. Zarnecki (Editors)	Springer		978-9402411331
Planetary Climate before the Space Age	R.D. Lorenz	Amazon Digital Services LLC	2017	
NASA/ESA/ASI Cassini-Huygens: 1997 onwards (Cassini orbiter, Huygens probe and future exploration concepts) (Owners' Workshop Manual)	R.D. Lorenz	Haynes Publishing UK	2017	978-1785211119
Dune Worlds: How Windblown Sand Shapes Planetary Landscapes	R.D. Lorenz and J. R. Zimbelman	Springer	2014	978-3540897248
Non-equilibrium Thermodynamics and the Production of Entropy: Life, Earth, and Beyond (Understanding Complex Systems)	Axel Kleidon, Ralph D. Lorenz (Editors)	Springer	2005	978-3-540-22495-2 and 3-540-22495-5
Spinning Flight: Dynamics of Frisbees, Boomerangs, Samaras, and Skipping Stones	R.D. Lorenz	Springer	2006	978-0387307794
Titan Unveiled: Saturn's Mysterious Moon Explored	R.D. Lorenz and J. Mitton	Princeton University Press	2010	978-0691146331
Planetary Landers and Entry Probes	A. Ball, J. Garry, R.D. Lorenz, V. Kerzhanovich	Cambridge University Press	2007	978-0521820028
Space Systems Failures: Disasters and Rescues of Satellites, Rocket and Space Probes (Springer Praxis Books)	D.M. Harland, R.D. Lorenz	Praxis	2005	978-0387215198
Lifting Titan's Veil: Exploring the Giant Moon of Saturn	R.D. Lorenz and J. Mitton	Cambridge University Press	2002	978-0521793483

== Filmography ==
Lorenz has appeared in numerous science documentaries and series, including NOVA, NASA's Unexplained Files, Horizon, and Wonders of the Solar System.
