= Selk =

Selk may refer to:

- SELK, as a four-letter acronym, the Independent Evangelical-Lutheran Church of Germany (German: Selbständige Evangelisch-Lutherische Kirche).
- Serket, an ancient Egyptian scorpion goddess
- Selk, Germany, a town in Schleswig-Holstein, Germany
- Selk, a sleeping bag with arms and legs (also known as a Selkbag or selk'bag), supposedly relating to the Selkʼnam people, indigenous to Tierra del Fuego and other parts of Patagonia
- Selk, referring to King Scorpion, or Scorpion II, the second of two kings so-named of Upper Egypt during the Protodynastic Period
- Selk (crater), an impact crater on the moon Titan
