= TSSM =

TSSM may refer to:

- Titan Saturn System Mission
- Type III secretion machinery
- Two-spotted spider mite
- The Spectacular Spider-Man
  - The Spectacular Spider-Man (TV series)
- The SpongeBob SquarePants Movie, particularly the video game of the same name
