= Boris Smeds =

Swedish radio engineer

Boris Smeds (born 16 October 1944) is a Swedish radio engineer and European Space Agency employee, noted for detecting a flaw in the Cassini-Huygens space mission.

Smeds was born in Uppsala and received his Licentiate in Technology from the Department of Electrical Measurements at the Lund University Faculty of Engineering in 1972. He has spent most of his working life working for the European Space Agency in Darmstadt, Germany.

In 2000 Smeds and other ESA engineers questioned the sufficiency of the previous testing of the Alenia Spazio-built communication system on Cassini, and Smeds and his colleague Claudio Sollazzo travelled to the Goldstone Deep Space Communications Complex in the Mojave Desert for additional tests, discovering that the design of the receiver on the Cassini orbiter had not sufficiently taken into account the Doppler shifting of the signals from the Huygens probe. The results led to a change in the trajectory of Cassini to work around the problem.

A story on Smeds, published in the IEEE Spectrum in October 2004, called him an "unsung hero".
