= Titan Saturn System Mission =

Cancelled NASA/ESA mission concept to Saturn

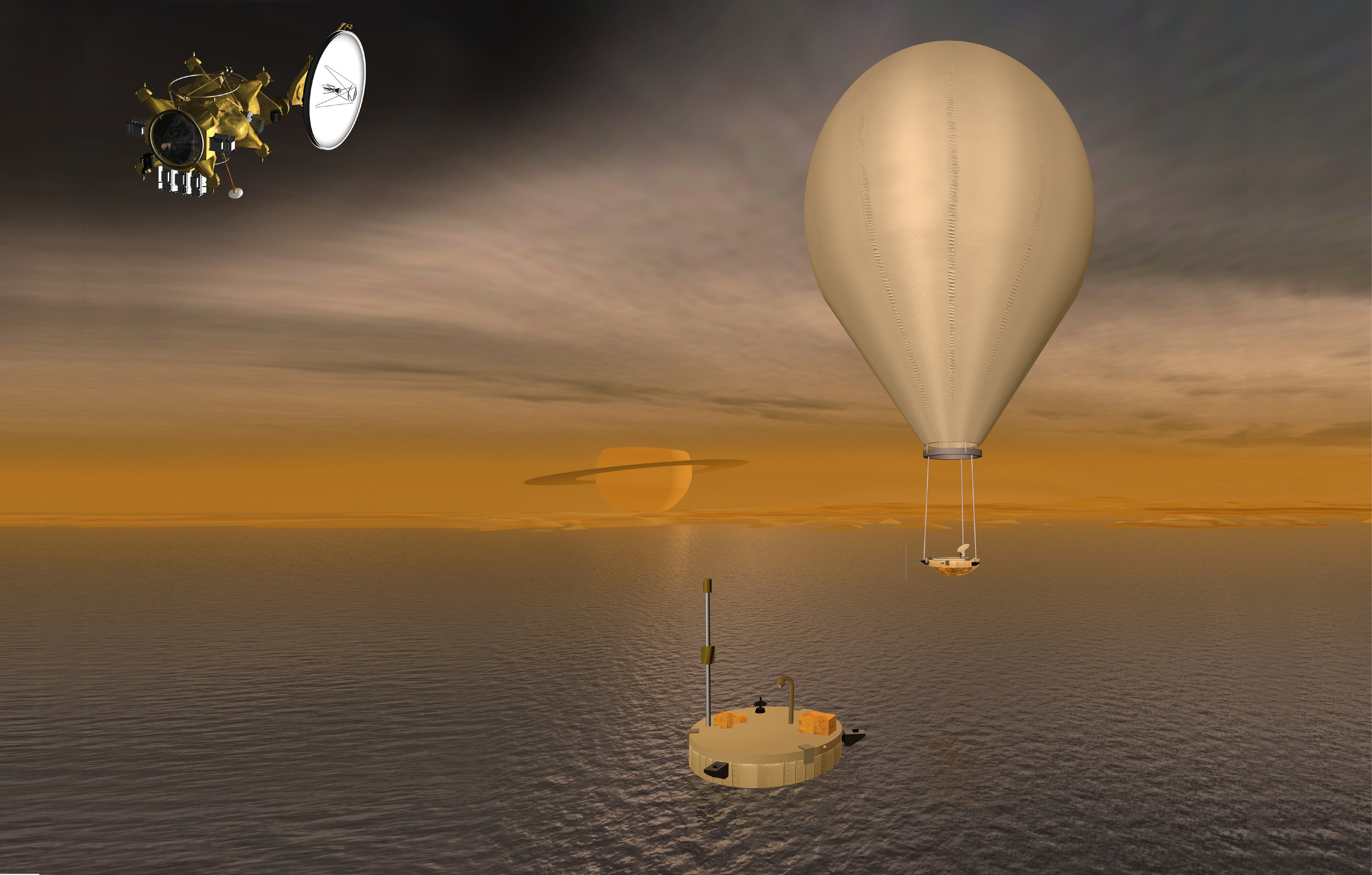
- Artist's impression of the three main components of the TSSM exploring Titan
- Names: TandEM
- Mission type: Saturn exploration
- Operator: NASA/ESA
- Website: sci.esa.int
- Mission duration: 2 years (proposed)

Spacecraft properties
- Launch mass: Orbiter: 1,613 kg (3,556 lb)
- Landing mass: Montgolfière:600 kg (1,300 lb); Lander: 190 kg (420 lb)

Start of mission
- Launch date: Proposed: Between 2020 and 2029
- Rocket: Delta IV Heavy, Space Launch System Block IB, or Atlas V

Orbital parameters
- Reference system: Titan
- Semi-major axis: 1,500 km (930 mi)
- Inclination: 85°
- Period: ~4.8 h

Titan orbiter
- Orbital insertion: c. 2029–2038 (proposed)

Titan atmospheric probe
- Spacecraft component: TSSM montgolfière

Titan lander
- Spacecraft component: Titan Mare Explorer or other TSSM lander proposal
- Landing site: Ligeia Mare
- Large Strategic Science Missions; Planetary Science Division

Titan Saturn System Mission (TSSM) was a joint NASA–ESA proposal for an exploration of Saturn and its moons Titan and Enceladus, where many complex phenomena were revealed by Cassini. TSSM was proposed to launch in 2020, following which it would have gotten gravity assists from Earth and Venus, and arrived at the Saturn system in 2029. The 4-year prime mission would include a two-year Saturn tour, a 2-month Titan aero-sampling phase, and a 20-month Titan orbit phase.

In 2009, a mission to Jupiter and its moons was given priority over Titan Saturn System Mission, although TSSM will continue to be assessed for possible development and launch.

== Origin and status ==
The Titan Saturn System Mission (TSSM) was officially created in January 2009 by the merging of the ESA's Titan and Enceladus Mission (TandEM) with NASA's Titan Explorer (2007) study, although plans to combine both concepts date at least back to early 2008. TSSM was competing against the Europa Jupiter System Mission (EJSM) proposal for funding, and in February 2009 it was announced that NASA/ESA had given EJSM priority ahead of TSSM. TSSM continued to be studied for a later launch date, near the 2020s. Detailed assessment reports of the mission elements as well as a specific concept for a lake-landing module for Titan's lakes called Titan Mare Explorer (TiME) with the potential of becoming a part of the TSSM have been proposed in February and October 2009, respectively.

In 2014 it was thought the TSSM might have been revived for a launch on the SLS super-heavy-lift rocket.

== Mission overview ==
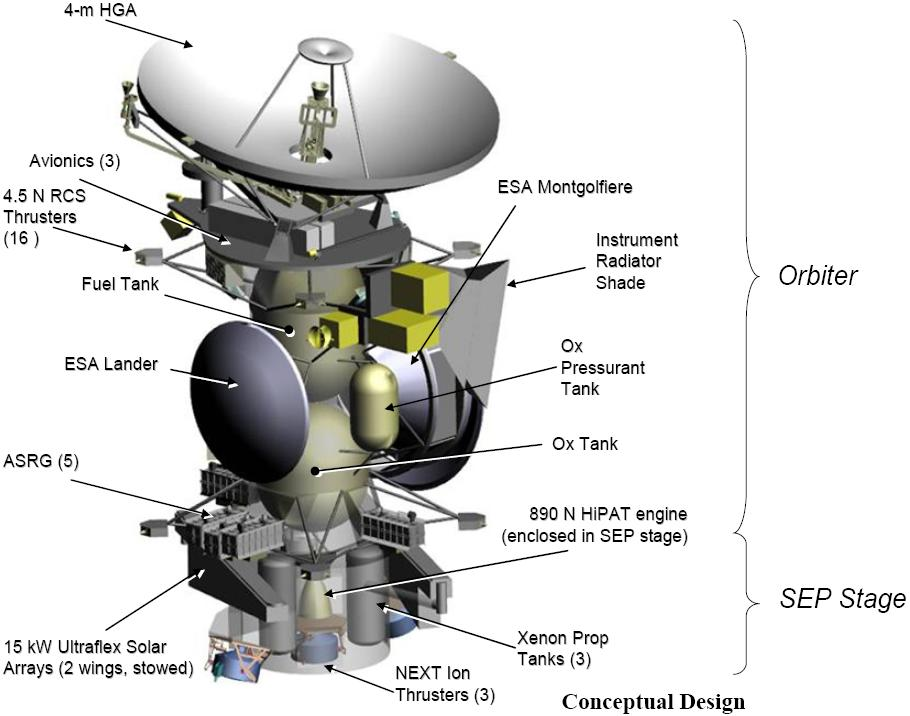
Schematic diagram of the TSSM (TandEM) orbiter

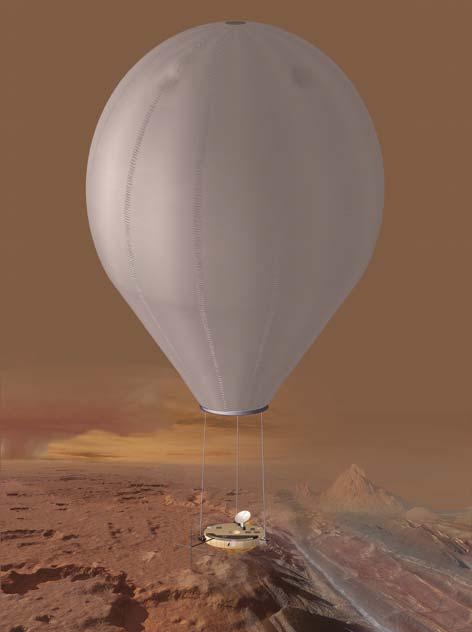
Part of the mission proposal is a balloon planned to circumnavigate Titan.

The TSSM mission consists of an orbiter and two Titan exploration probes: a hot air balloon that will float in Titan's clouds, and a lander that will splash down on one of its methane seas.

Both probes’ data are to be relayed to a Titan orbiter. They will be equipped to study Titan's features with instruments for imaging, radar profiling, and surface as well as atmospheric sampling, much more complete than done by the Cassini–Huygens mission.

The spacecraft will use several gravity assist flybys of other planets to enable it to reach Saturn. The baseline design envisaged a September 2020 launch, followed by four gravity assists (Earth–Venus–Earth–Earth), and arrival at Saturn 9 years later in October 2029. This is one of several available Earth-to-Saturn transfer options from the year 2018 through 2022. Current NASA plans do not give the TSSM a priority, however, and it is unlikely any of the proposed launch dates can be met.

Upon Saturn arrival, in October 2029, the orbiter's chemical propulsion system would place the spacecraft into orbit around Saturn, followed by a two-year Saturn Tour Phase, characterized by the deployment of the in situ elements, and including a minimum of seven close Enceladus flybys and 16 Titan flybys. During this period, repeated satellite gravity assists and maneuvers will reduce the energy needed to insert into Titan's orbit. As the craft completes its flyby by Enceladus, the orbiter will analyze the unusual cryovolcanic plumes at the moon's south pole.

The Montgolfière, a hot air balloon, would be released on approach to the first Titan flyby for ballistic entry into Titan's atmosphere for its six Earth months’ mission from April 2030 to October 2030. Based on Cassini–Huygens discoveries, the Montgolfière should be able to circumnavigate Titan at least once during its nominal lifetime at its deployment latitude of about 20°N, 10 kilometers above Titan's surface.

=== Lake lander ===
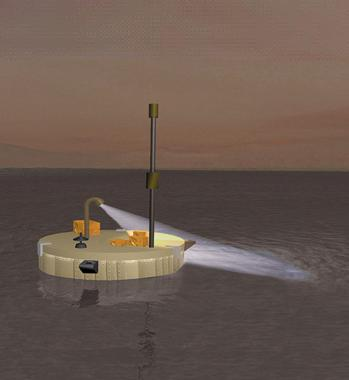
The Titan Mare Explorer (TiME) could become the lake-lander of the TSSM.

Numerous proposals have been brought forward with respect to the lake-lander concept. One of the most detailed plans so far is the so-called Titan Mare Explorer (TiME), which had originally been proposed as a separate scout mission, but might eventually be postponed and included in the TSSM. If approved, TiME would be released by the orbiter on its second Titan flyby. Due to Titan's haze layer and its distance to the Sun, the lander cannot be powered by solar panels and it would rely on the new Advanced Stirling Radioisotope Generator (ASRG), which is a prototype meant to provide availability of long-lived power supplies for landed networks and other planetary missions. The lander will target Ligeia Mare, a northern polar sea of liquid hydrocarbons at about 79°N. The probe will descend by parachute, like the Huygens probe of 2005. During the 6 hours of descent it will analyze the atmosphere and then splashdown on the liquid surface. The plutonium-powered craft's principal function is to sample and analyze organics on the surface for a period of about 3 to 6 months; this would be the first floating exploration of an extraterrestrial sea. In addition to the primary mission, TiME could be equipped with a suite of advanced instruments to study the chemical composition and physical properties of Titan's lakes. This includes a spectrometer to analyze the liquid hydrocarbons, a sonar to map the lakebed, and a weather station to monitor Titan's unique meteorological conditions. Furthermore, mission planners are considering the inclusion of a submersible probe that could be deployed from TiME to explore beneath the surface of Ligeia Mare, providing unprecedented insights into the potential for prebiotic chemistry in Titan's seas. These enhancements would not only expand our understanding of Titan but could also offer clues to the broader question of life's origins in the universe.

== Science goals and objectives ==
The major goals of the TSSM mission can be summarized under four categories:

- Explore Titan as a system
- Study Titan's organic inventory and astrobiological potential
- Constrain Titan's origin and evolution models
- Recover information on Enceladus and Saturn's magnetosphere

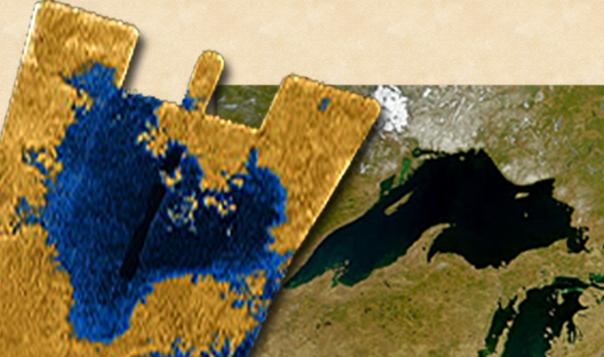
Comparison of Ligeia Mare's area with Lake Superior on Earth.

At Titan, the science goals would be to provide information on such aspects as the composition of the surface and the geographic distribution of the various organic constituents; on the methane cycle and the methane reservoirs; on the ages of the surface features, and in particular on whether cryovolcanism and tectonism are actively ongoing or are relics of a more active past; on the presence or absence of ammonia, of a magnetic field and of a sub-surface ocean; on the chemistry that drives complex ion formation in the upper atmosphere; and on a large altitude range in the atmosphere, from 400–900km, which remains poorly explored after Cassini. In addition, much remains to be understood about seasonal changes of the atmosphere at all levels, and the long-term escape of constituents to space.

TiME lander would splashdown on Ligeia Mare, a methane sea on Titan's northern hemisphere. It is believed that Titan's methane cycle is analogous to Earth's hydrologic cycle, with meteorological working fluid existing in liquid and gas phase. TiME would directly discern the methane cycle of Titan and help understand its similarities and differences to the hydrologic cycle on Earth. However, questions about the sources of re-supply of methane to the atmosphere remain to be answered. This world is built by organic activities which still operate and Cassini–Huygens findings suggest a world with a balance of geologic and atmospheric processes that is the solar system's best analogue to Earth. Moreover, an interior ocean discovered by Cassini, deep underneath Titan's dense atmosphere and surface is thought to be largely composed of liquid water. TSSM would be the first mission in the 50 years of space exploration where an extensive and interdisciplinary in situ survey of active organic chemistry and climate on the land, on the sea, and in the air of another world will take place.

== See also ==
- Kronos (spacecraft)
- Dragonfly (Titan space probe)
