= Dragonfly (Titan space probe) =

Future NASA mission to Titan

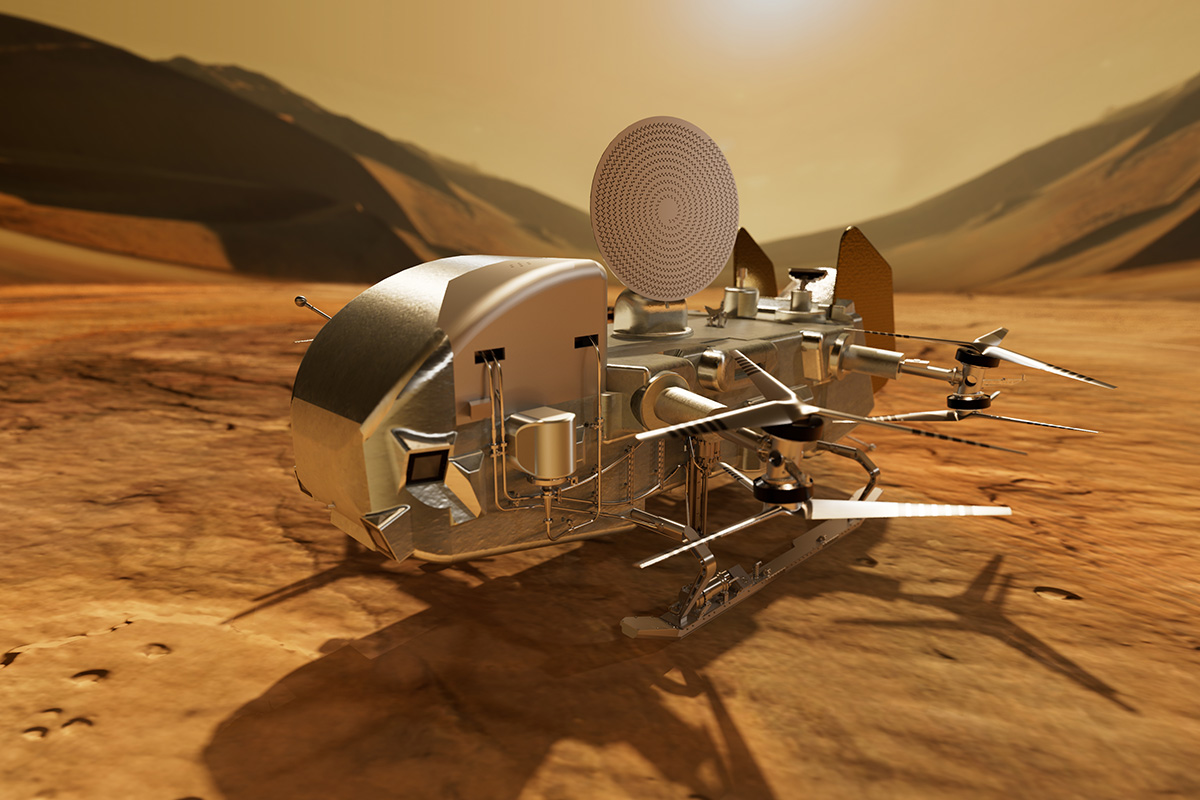
- Artist's impression of the Dragonfly spacecraft on the surface of Titan
- Names: New Frontiers 4
- Mission type: Titan rotorcraft
- Operator: NASA / APL
- Website: dragonfly.jhuapl.edu
- Mission duration: 10 years (planned); 3.3 years (Science phase)

Spacecraft properties
- Spacecraft type: Rotorcraft lander
- Manufacturer: Applied Physics Laboratory
- Landing mass: ≈875 kg (1,929 lb)
- Power: 70 watts (desired) from an MMRTG

Start of mission
- Launch date: 5–25 July 2028 (planned)
- Rocket: Falcon Heavy
- Launch site: Kennedy, LC-39A
- Contractor: SpaceX

Titan aircraft
- Landing date: 2034
- Landing site: Ahmakiq Undae, Shangri-La
- Distance flown: 8 km (5.0 mi) per flight (planned)
Instruments
- DraMS: Dragonfly Mass Spectrometer
- DrACO: Drill for Acquisition of Complex Organics
- DraGNS: Dragonfly Gamma-Ray and Neutron Spectrometer
- DraGMet: Dragonfly Geophysics and Meteorology
- DragonCam: Dragonfly Camera Suite
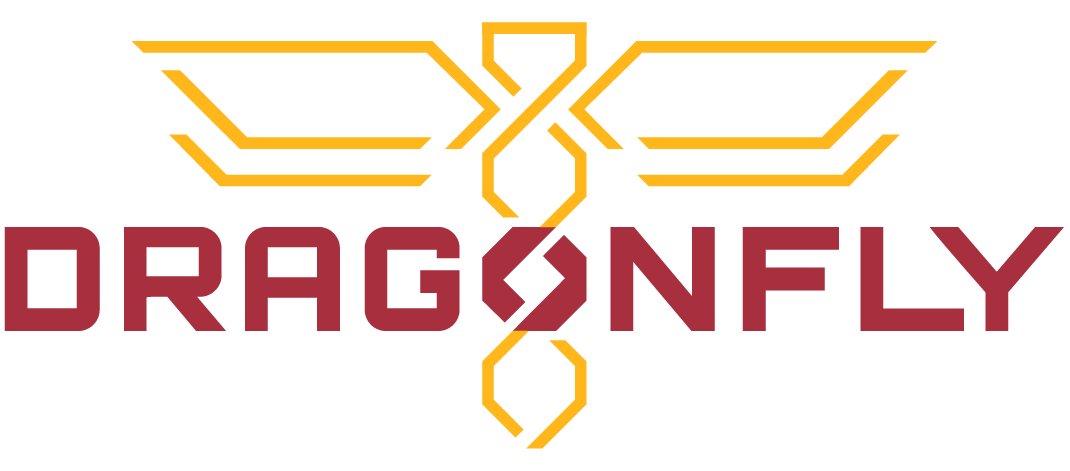
- Dragonfly Mission Insignia New Frontiers

Dragonfly is an upcoming NASA mission to send a robotic rotorcraft to the surface of Titan, the largest moon of Saturn. It is to be launched in July 2028 and arrive in 2034, becoming the first aircraft on Titan. Built to study prebiotic chemistry and extraterrestrial habitability, it is intended to make the first powered and fully controlled atmospheric flight on any natural satellite. It will then use its vertical takeoffs and landings (VTOL) capability to move between exploration sites. Its main mission will last for around three years and could cover 115 km (70 miles) from its original landing site, visiting and landing at 20-30 sites.

Titan is the only extraterrestrial body in the Solar System with an abundant, complex, and diverse carbon-rich chemistry and a surface dominated by water ice with an interior water ocean, making it a high-priority target for astrobiology and origin-of-life studies. The mission was proposed in April 2017 to NASA's New Frontiers program by the Johns Hopkins Applied Physics Laboratory (APL), and was selected as one of two finalists (out of twelve proposals) in December 2017 to further refine the mission's concept. On 27 June 2019, Dragonfly was selected to become the fourth New Frontiers mission. In April 2024, the mission was confirmed and moved to its final development stages.

== Overview ==
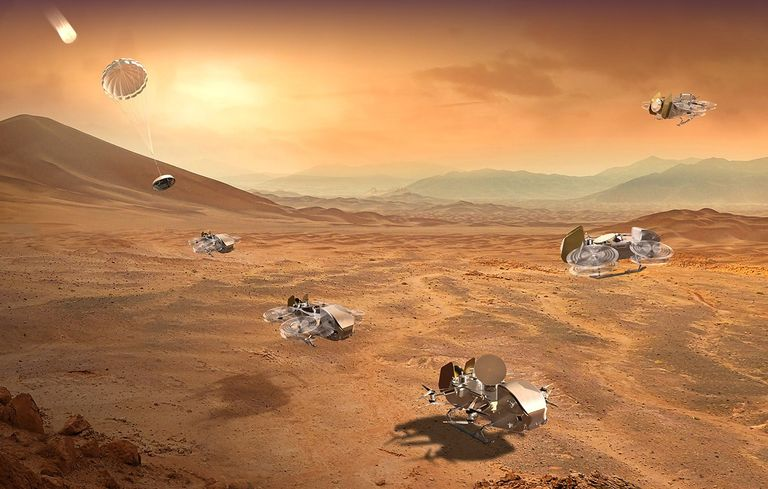
Artist's rendering of the entry, descent, and landing (EDL) and take-off and landing sequence of the Dragonfly as of 2026.

Dragonfly is an astrobiology mission to Titan to assess its microbial habitability and study its prebiotic chemistry at various locations. Dragonfly is designed to perform controlled flights and vertical takeoffs and landings between locations. The mission is to make flights to multiple locations on the surface, which allows sampling of diverse regions and geological contexts.

Titan is a compelling astrobiology target because its surface contains abundant complex carbon-rich chemistry and because both liquid water (transient) and liquid hydrocarbons can occur on its surface, possibly forming a prebiotic primordial soup.

A successful flight of Dragonfly would make it the second rotorcraft to fly on a celestial body other than Earth. The first was Ingenuity, an uncrewed helicopter that landed on Mars with the Perseverance rover on 18 February 2021 as part of the Mars 2020 mission and performed powered flight from April 2021 to January 2024.

== History ==
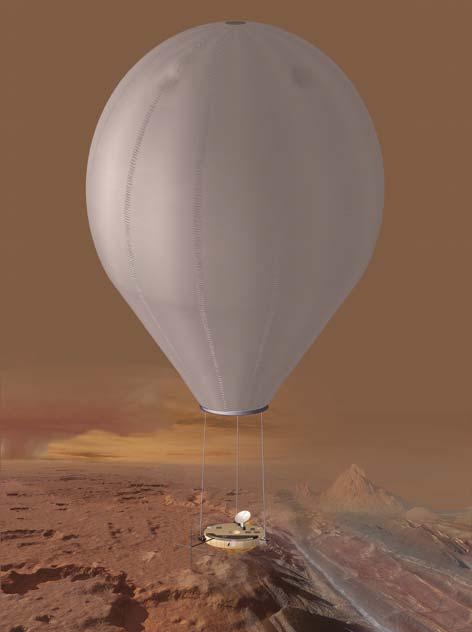
The previously passed-over TSSM mission proposed a Titan aircraft in the form of a Montgolfier balloon with a boat-lander gondola.

The initial Dragonfly conception took place over a dinner conversation between scientists Jason W. Barnes of Department of Physics, University of Idaho, (who had previously made the AVIATR proposal for a Titan aircraft) and Ralph Lorenz of Johns Hopkins University Applied Physics Laboratory, and it took 15 months to make it a detailed mission proposal. The principal investigator is Elizabeth Turtle, a planetary scientist at the Johns Hopkins Applied Physics Laboratory.

The Dragonfly mission builds on several earlier studies of Titan mobile aerial exploration, including the 2007 Titan Explorer Flagship study, which advocated a Montgolfier balloon for regional exploration, and AVIATR, an airplane concept considered for the Discovery program. The concept of a rotorcraft lander that flew on battery power, recharged during the eight-Earth-day Titan night from a radioisotope power source, was proposed by Lorenz in 2000. More recent discussion has included a 2014 Titan rotorcraft study by Larry Matthies, at the Jet Propulsion Laboratory, that would have a small rotorcraft deployed from a lander or a balloon. The hot-air balloon concepts would have used the heat from a radioisotope thermoelectric generator (RTG).

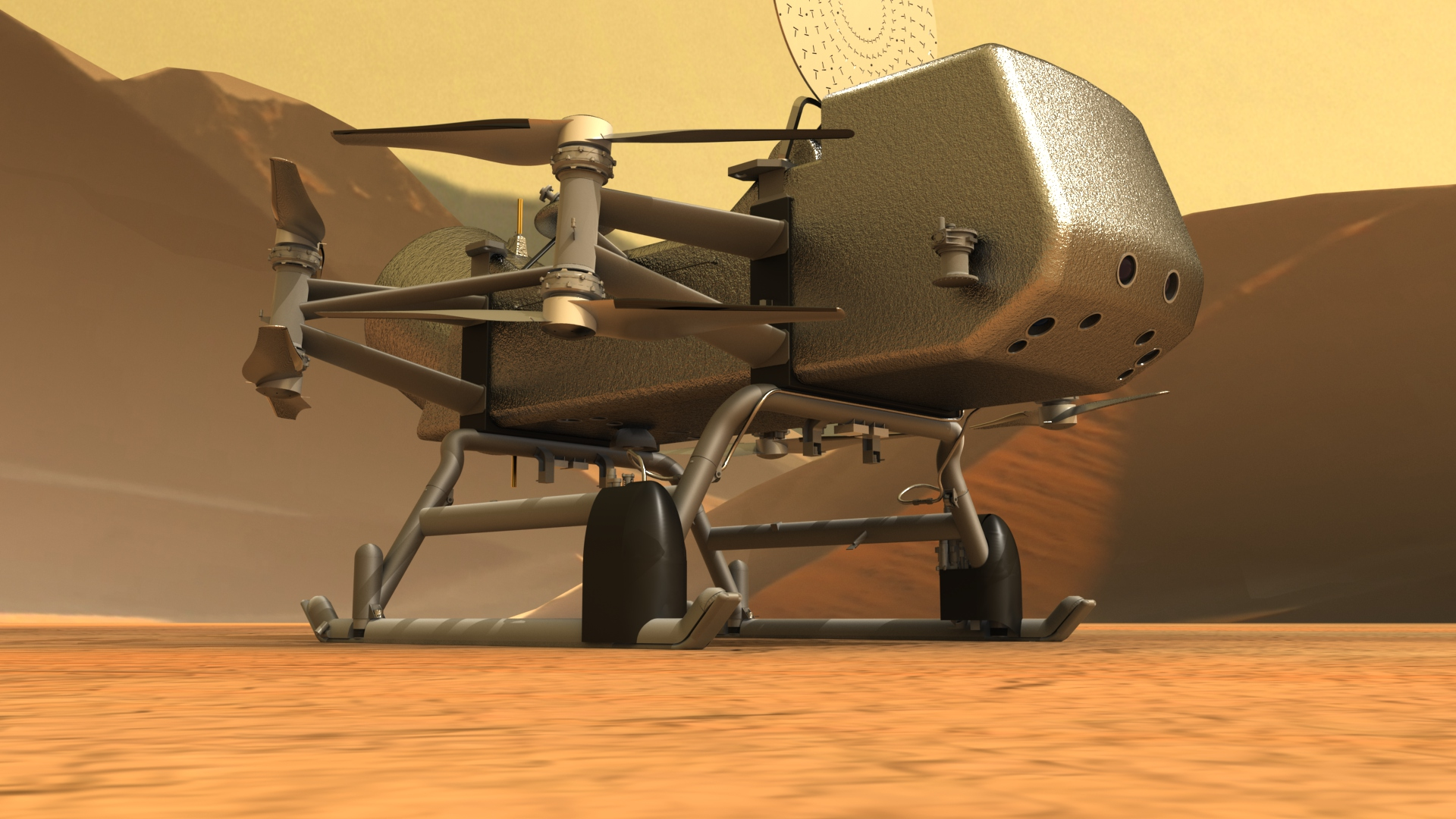
2021 rendering of Dragonfly

Dragonfly is to use its multi-rotor vehicle to transport its instrument suite to multiple locations to make measurements of surface composition, atmospheric conditions, and geologic processes.

Dragonfly and CAESAR, a comet sample return mission to 67P/Churyumov–Gerasimenko, were the two finalists for the New Frontiers program Mission 4, and on 27 June 2019, NASA selected Dragonfly for development with a plan to launch in June 2027.

On 3 March 2023, Dragonfly passed its preliminary design review (PDR). In November 2023 following NASA's decision to postpone the formal confirmation of the mission due to funding uncertainties, the launch was delayed by one year, with a new launch date set for July 2028. On 25 November 2024, NASA announced the launch service award for the Dragonfly mission. Dragonfly will launch on a SpaceX Falcon Heavy with a targeted launch period from 5 July 2028, to 25 July 2028.

On 25 April 2025, Dragonfly passed its critical design review phase which marks the beginning of the full-scale physical construction and testing of the probe.

During the 2025 federal government shutdown, NASA's Goddard Space Flight Center began closing multiple buildings and consolidating equipment, which the agency describes as a pre-planned “strategic consolidation” not expected to impact missions. A NASA spokesperson told CNN that work on the Nancy Grace Roman Space Telescope and the Dragonfly mission would continue during the shutdown as excepted operations.

According to Space.com, some employees at the center expressed concern that the manner and timing of the closures could disrupt work on those projects, and CNN reported that an internal document compiled by Goddard staff cited potential impacts on specialized testing laboratories.

Construction of the spacecraft began on 10 March 2026.

On June 1, 2026, the Dragonfly design and test team announced that thermal-structural testing of the entry probe's heat shield had been completed in the desert of New Mexico using Sandia's Solar Tower, a test facility that uses hundreds of calibrated mirror-like systems to focus the Sun's energy onto the test heat shield unit. The test heat shield successfully withstood the extreme heat, even though defects had been intentionally introduced into the unit. In the same announcement, the team also reported that it had recently measured the signal patterns emitted by Dragonfly's high-gain antenna (HGA) in an APL test chamber designed to simulate space environment.

On 29 June, the Dragonfly mission reached a major development milestone when the mission team at the Johns Hopkins Applied Physics Laboratory (APL) delivered the spacecraft's nearly 4-meter (13 ft) fuselage for the next phase of integration ahead of schedule. The delivery followed approximately one month of structural testing of the lander frame assembly, which includes the landing skids, the cover for the spacecraft's radioisotope power system, and the arms that will support Dragonfly's eight rotor assemblies.

Following the completion of structural testing, integration of the spacecraft's mechanical, thermal, and electrical systems began on 1 July. During this phase, engineers installed the flight bulkheads, wiring harnesses, cables, and electrical connectors within the fuselage. Additional avionics, electronic subsystems, and scientific instruments were scheduled to be integrated after completion of their assembly and testing by the mission's partner institutions.

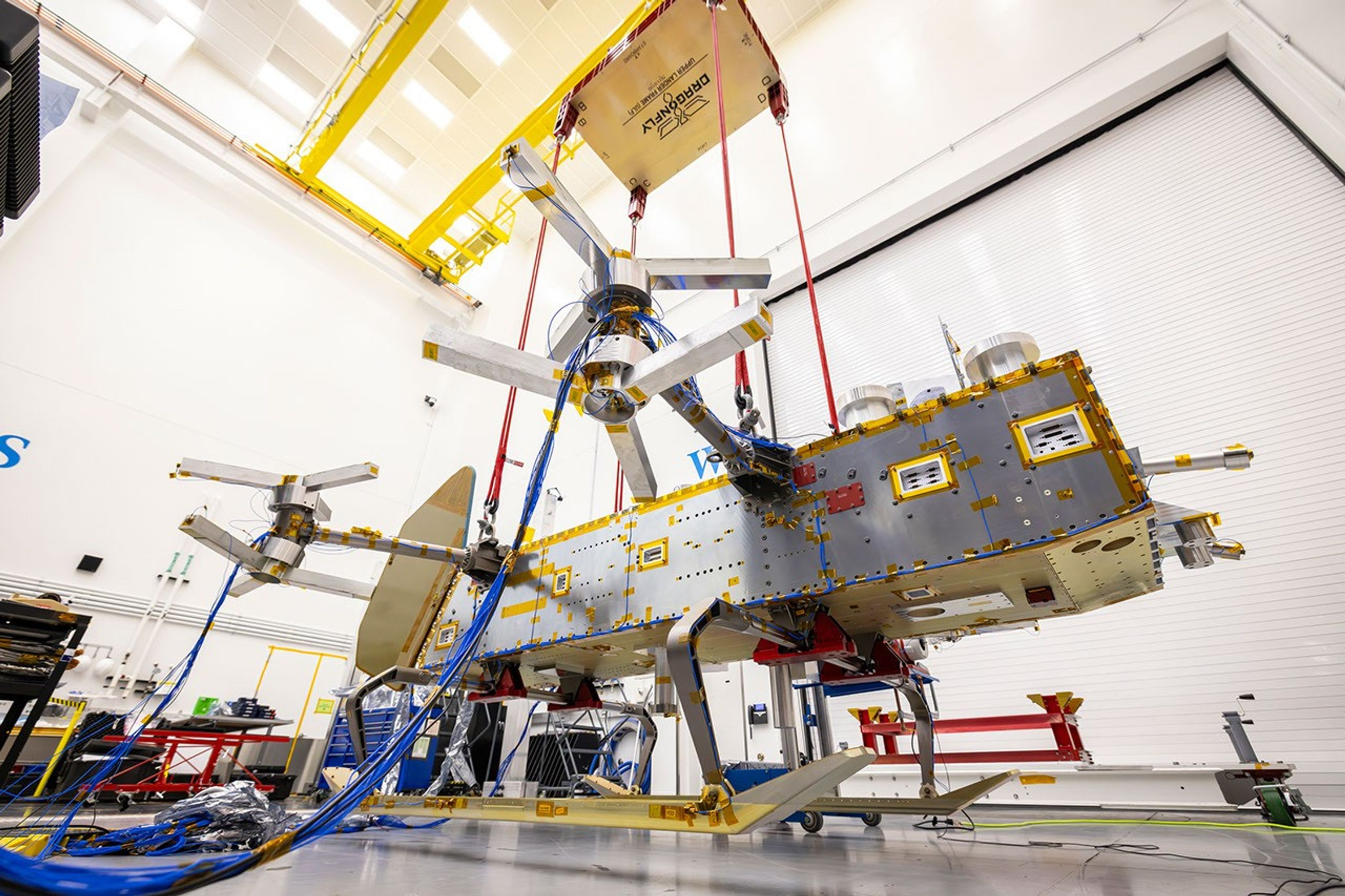
Dragonfly suspended by bungee cords during its ground vibration testing in July 2026.

During vibration testing, mass simulators were installed in place of the flight instruments and electronics, which were undergoing assembly and testing at other facilities. For the ground vibration test, the rotorcraft structure was suspended several centimeters above the ground using long bungee cords, allowing engineers to measure how vibrations generated at the rotor attachment points propagated through the airframe to critical sensors. According to the mission team, suspending the vehicle in this manner provided a structural configuration comparable to that expected during Dragonfly's first flight. The vibration campaign also included a "sit-down" configuration, in which the lander was lowered onto protective padding and rested on its landing skids while engineers measured the structural response expected during surface operations on Titan.

=== Funding ===
The CAESAR and Dragonfly missions received US$4 million funding each through the end of 2018 to further develop and mature their concepts. On 27 June 2019 NASA announced the selection of Dragonfly, which is expected to be built and launched by July 2028. Dragonfly is the fourth in NASA's New Frontiers portfolio, a series of principal investigator-led planetary science investigations that fall under a development cost cap of approximately US$850 million, and including launch services, the total cost projection is approximately US$1 billion. A revised cost projection was released in April 2024, with Dragonfly now expected to incur a total lifecycle cost of US$3.35 billion due to supply chain increases and delays caused by the COVID-19 pandemic.

== Science objectives ==
The Huygens atmospheric probe's descent into Titan, with video and data from 2005

Titan is similar to the very early Earth and can provide clues to how life may have arisen on Earth. In 2005, the European Space Agency's Huygens lander acquired some atmospheric and surface measurements on Titan, detecting tholins, which are a mix of various types of hydrocarbons (organic compounds) in the atmosphere and on the surface. Because Titan's atmosphere obscures the surface at many wavelengths, the specific compositions of solid hydrocarbon materials on Titan's surface remain essentially unknown. Measuring the compositions of materials in different geologic settings is intended to reveal how far prebiotic chemistry has progressed in environments that provide known key ingredients for life, such as pyrimidines (bases used to encode information in DNA) and amino acids, the building blocks of proteins.

Areas of particular interest are sites where extraterrestrial liquid water in impact melt or potential cryovolcanic flows may have interacted with the abundant organic compounds. Dragonfly would provide the capability to explore diverse locations to characterize the habitability of Titan's environment, investigate how far prebiotic chemistry has progressed, and search for biosignatures indicative of life based on water as solvent and even hypothetical types of biochemistry.

The atmosphere contains plentiful nitrogen and methane, and strong evidence indicates that liquid methane exists on the surface. Evidence also indicates the presence of liquid water and ammonia under the surface, which may be delivered to the surface by cryovolcanic activity.

== Design and construction ==
Dragonfly is designed as a rotorcraft lander, much like a large quadcopter with double rotors, which is known as an octocopter. The rotor configuration provides redundancy to enable the mission to tolerate the loss of at least one rotor or motor. Each of the craft's eight rotors is 1.35 m (4.4 ft) in diameter. The aircraft would travel at about 10 m/s (36 km/h; 22 mph) and climb to an altitude of up to 4 km (13,000 ft). The craft is designed to operate in a space radiation environment and in temperatures averaging 94 K (−179.2 °C).

Flight on Titan is aerodynamically benign. Titan's low gravity and its dense atmosphere's paucity of wind permits unimpeded and efficient rotor propulsion. The power needed to achieve flight for a given mass is about 40 times lower than that required on Earth. The atmosphere possesses 1.45 times the pressure and about 4 times the density of Earth's, and when combined with a local gravity only 13.8% of Earth's, flight becomes an order of magnitude easier to sustain. Despite these advantages Titan's cold temperatures, lower light levels and higher atmospheric drag on the airframe will all present challenges.

Dragonfly should be able to fly several kilometers, powered by a lithium-ion battery, which is to be recharged by a Multi-Mission Radioisotope Thermoelectric Generator (MMRTG) during the night. MMRTGs convert the heat from the natural decay of a radioisotope into electricity. Twenty-four Radioisotope Heater Units (RHUs) are also kept reserved for this mission. The rotorcraft should be able to travel 16 km (10 mi) on each battery charge and stay aloft for a half hour each time. The vehicle is to have sensors to scout new science targets, and then return to the original site until new landing destinations are approved by mission controllers.

The Dragonfly rotorcraft will weigh approximately 875 kg (1,929 lb) and be packaged inside a heatshield of 3.7 m (12 ft) diameter. Regolith samples are to be obtained by two sample acquisition drills and hoses, one on each landing skid, for delivery to the mass spectrometer instrument.

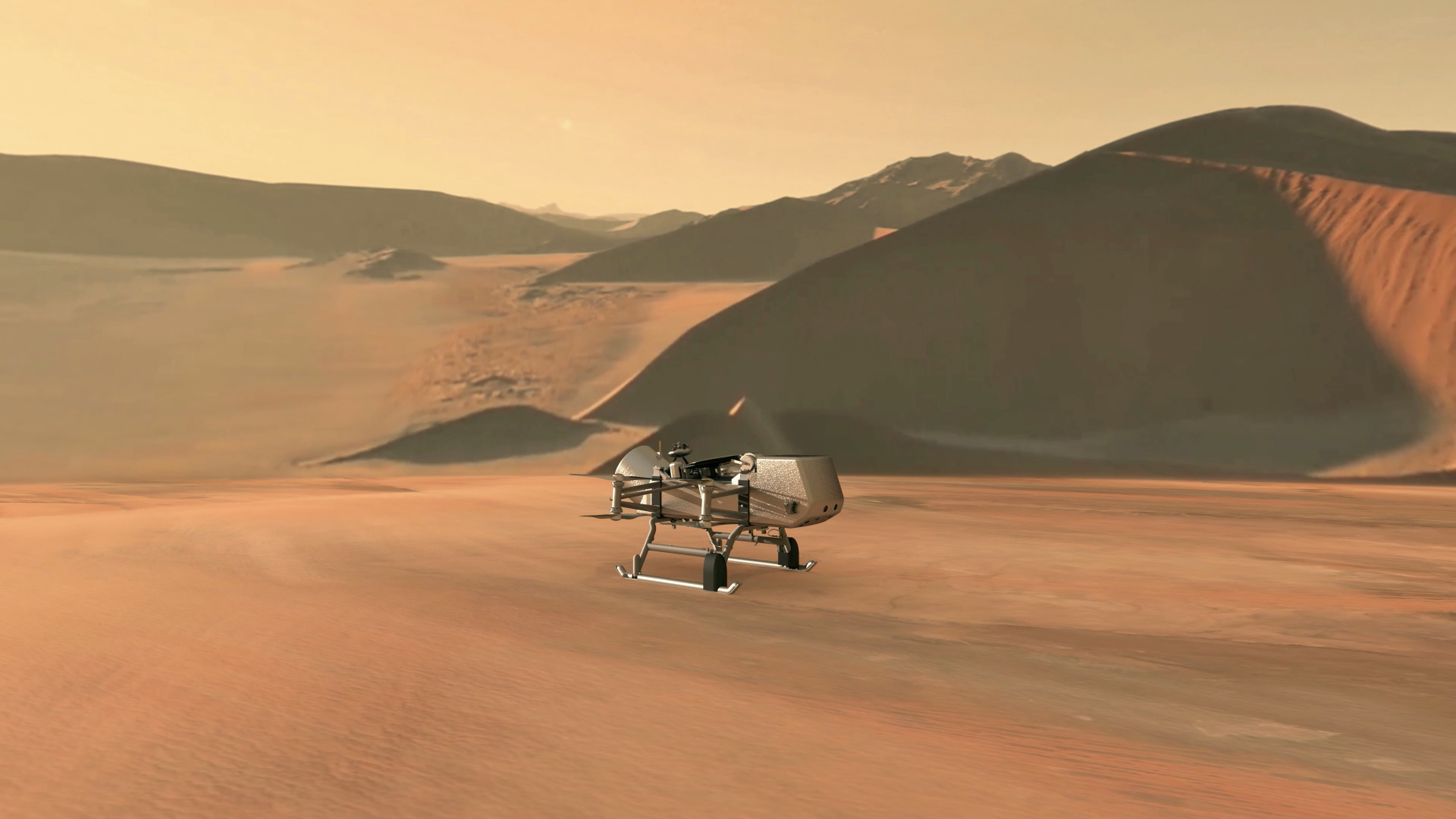
An artist's concept of the Dragonfly rotorcraft-lander approaching a site on Titan

The craft is to remain on the ground during the Titan nights, which last about eight Earth days or 192 hours. Activities during the night may include sample collection and analysis, seismological studies like diagnosing wave activity on the northern hydrocarbon seas, meteorological monitoring, and local microscopic imaging using LED illuminators as flown on Phoenix lander and Curiosity rover. The craft is designed to communicate directly to Earth with a high-gain antenna.

The Penn State Vertical Lift Research Center of Excellence is responsible for rotor design and analysis, rotorcraft flight-control development, scaled rotorcraft testbed development, ground testing support, and flight performance assessment.

=== Scientific payload ===
Video showing Dragonfly 3D model with all its instruments

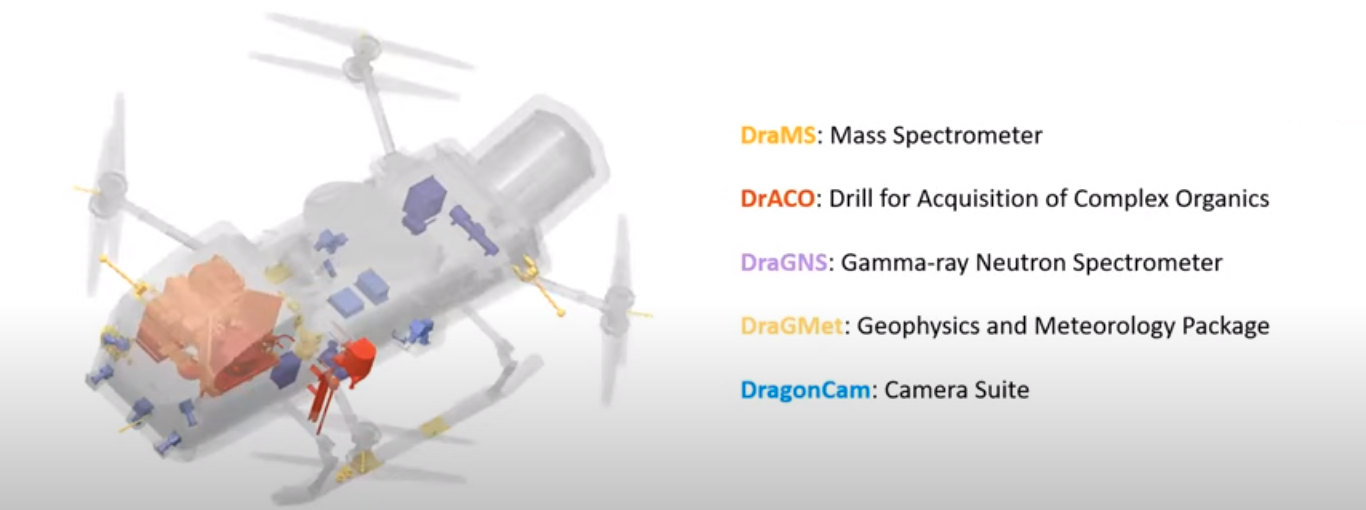
Dragonfly's scientific payload

- DraMS (Dragonfly Mass Spectrometer) is a mass spectrometer to identify chemical components, especially those relevant to biological processes, in surface and atmospheric samples.
- DrACO (Drill for Acquisition of Complex Organics), a rotary-percussive drill to sample and pneumatically transfer surface material.
- DraGNS (Dragonfly Gamma-Ray and Neutron Spectrometer), consists of a deuterium-tritium Pulsed Neutron Generator and a set of a gamma-ray spectrometer and neutron spectrometer to identify the surface composition under the lander.
- DraGMet (Dragonfly Geophysics and Meteorology) is a suite of meteorological sensors including a seismometer.
- DragonCam (Dragonfly Camera Suite) is a set of microscopic and panoramic cameras to image Titan's terrain and scout for scientifically interesting landing sites.

=== High-Gain Antenna ===
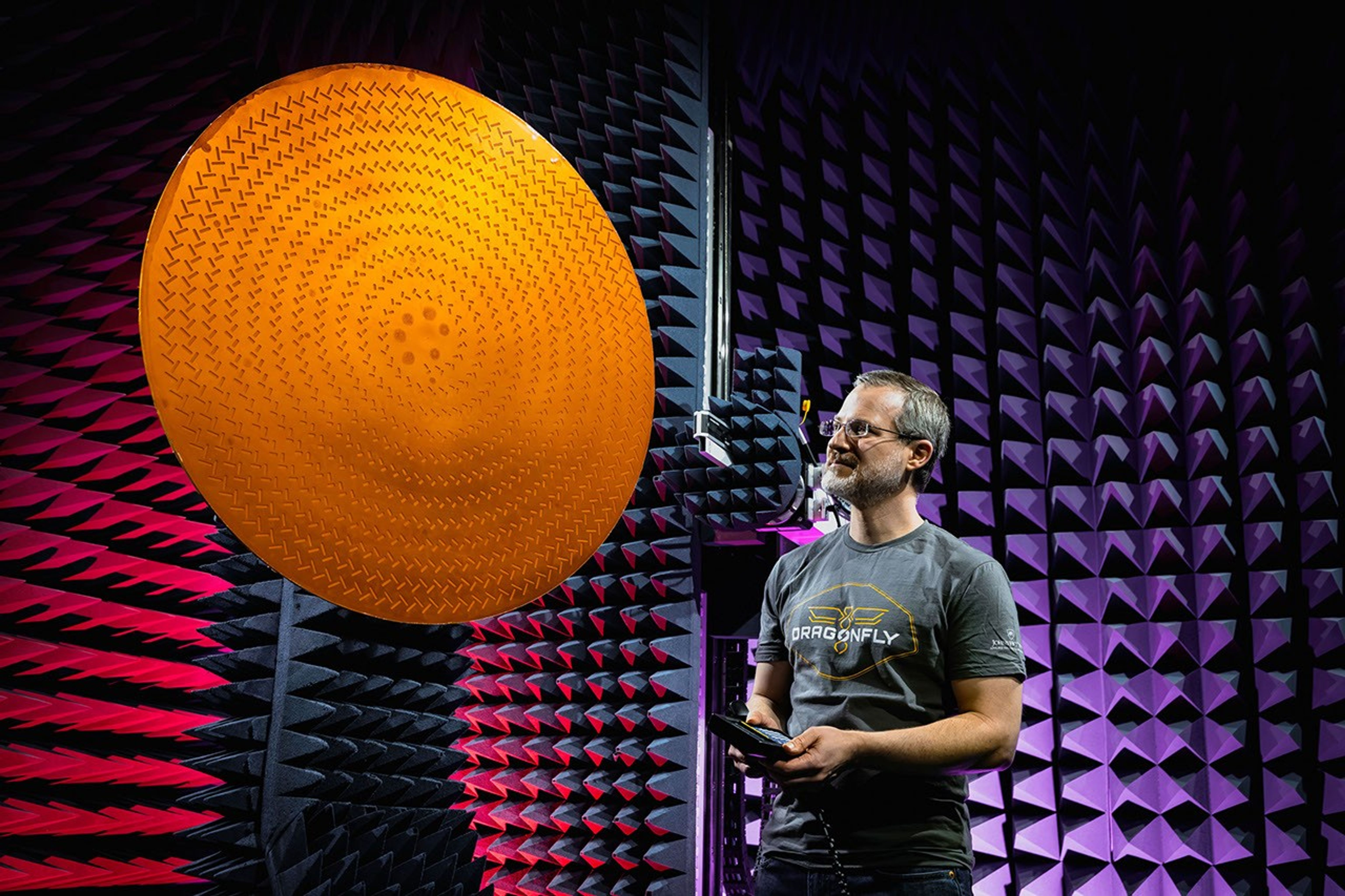
Dragonfly's high-gain antenna dish being tested in a test chamber. The cones in the background absorb stray radio waves, helping simulate the conditions of open space.

The probe's high-gain antenna (HGA) is a 87 cm (34.4 in) diameter, radial-line, disk-shaped slot antenna that uses numerous small slots to produce a narrow, focused transmission radio beam. The HGA will serve as Dragonfly's primary antenna for transmitting scientific data, and it will be mounted on a gimbal atop the lander, allowing it to track Earth from different locations across Titan's surface. Protected by a layer of Kapton thermal insulation, it is designed to operate in Titan's frigid environment, where average temperatures are approximately −179 °C (94 K; −290 °F).

The HGA is one of three antennas aboard Dragonfly. The spacecraft will also carry a medium-gain antenna as a backup communications system and a low-gain antenna for transmitting status tones during flight and supporting emergency communications.

=== Heat shield ===
Dragonfly will be protected from the heat of entry through Titan's thick atmosphere using a heat shield. The thermal protection material of this heat shield is made from carbon fiber and a lightweight resin (exact type unspecified as of June 2026). Using hundreds of precisely calibrated mirror systems of Sandia's Solar Tower, researchers concentrated solar energy onto their test unit. This setup produced temperatures of approximately 2,500 °C (4,530 °F) on sections of Dragonfly's heat shield material. The tests evaluated both the material's resistance to intense thermal radiation and its ability to withstand the rapid temperature fluctuations expected during the mission. The heat shield performed as expected in combined mechanical and thermal testing in the hot, New Mexican desert, even in cases when it was intentionally marred with defects.

== Public Outreach ==
NASA’s organized a "Send Your Name" campaign to boost public interest in and awareness of the space mission.

== Mission timeline ==
A global image of Titan showing Ahmakiq Undae (highlighted in violet), the future landing site of Dragonfly.

=== Trajectory ===
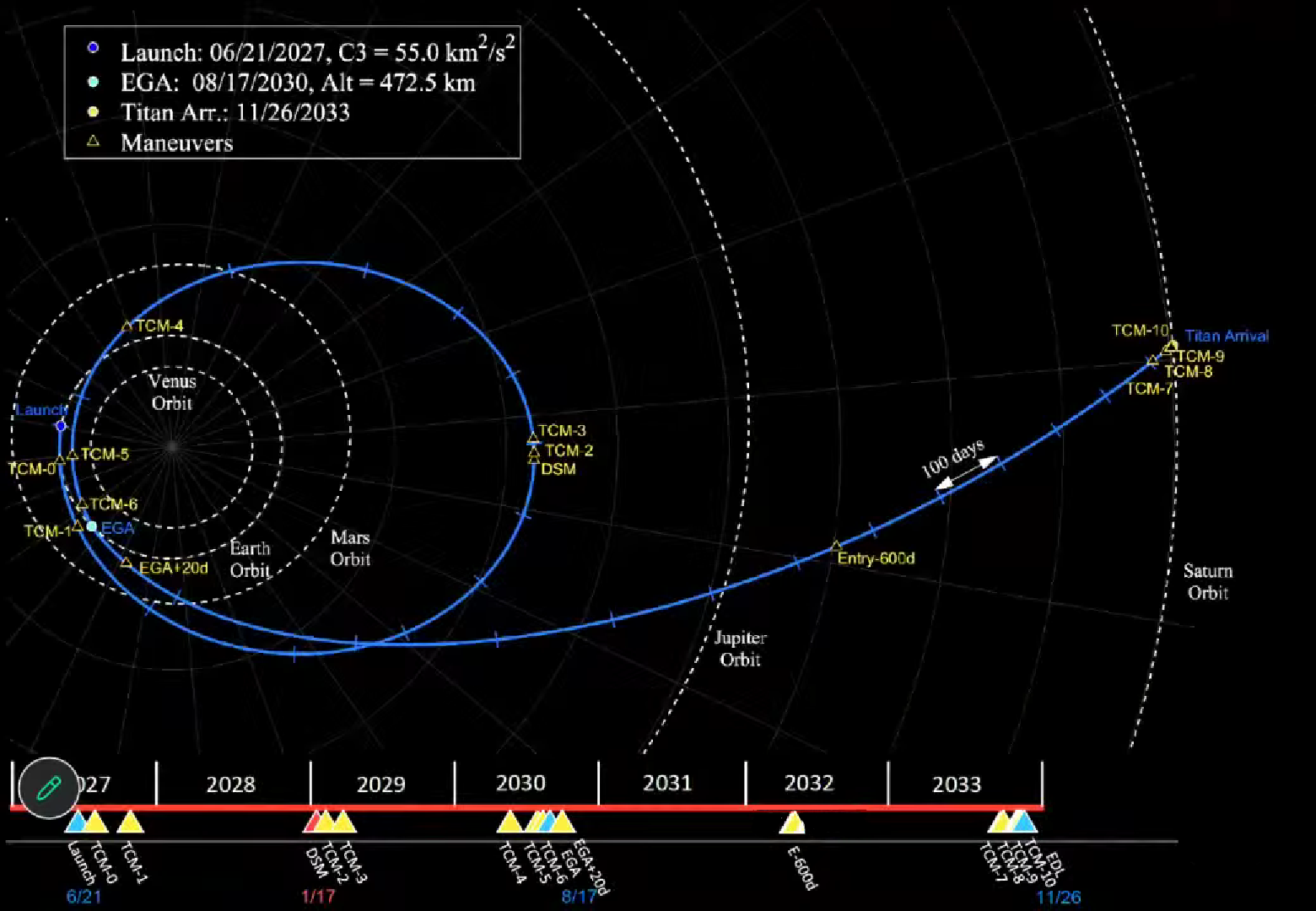
The presentation slide of Dr. Jason W. Barnes, showing Dragonfly's trajectory towards Titan. The projected arrival date is outdated.

Dragonfly is expected to launch in July 2028 on a Falcon Heavy and to take six years to reach Titan, arriving by 2034. The spacecraft will perform a gravity assist flyby of Earth to gain additional velocity on its way to Titan. The spacecraft would be the first dedicated outer Solar System mission not to visit Jupiter, as this traditional means of gravity assisted flyby will not be usefully close to the anticipated flight path to Saturn.

=== Entry and descent ===
The cruise stage is to separate from the entry capsule 10 minutes before encountering Titan's atmosphere. The lander would then descend to the surface of Titan using an aeroshell and a series of two parachutes, while the spent cruise stage would burn up in uncontrolled atmospheric entry. The duration of the descent phase is expected to be 105 minutes. The aeroshell is derived from the Genesis sample return capsule and the PICA heat shield is similar to MSL and Mars 2020 design and should protect the spacecraft for the first 6 minutes of its descent. Although Titan's atmosphere is nitrogen-rich similar to Earth's, the probe may encounter a more extreme entry environment that could increase the ablative erosion of its heat shield than previously expected.

At a speed of Mach 1.5, a drogue parachute is to deploy, to slow the capsule to subsonic speeds. Due to Titan's comparatively thick atmosphere and low gravity, the drogue chute phase should last for 80 minutes. A larger main parachute is to replace the drogue chute when the descent speed is sufficiently low. During the 20 minutes on the main chute, the lander is to be prepared for separation. The heat shield is to be jettisoned, the landing skids are to be extended, and sensors such as radar and lidar are to be activated. At an altitude of 1.2 km (0.75 mi), the lander should be released from its parachute for a powered flight to the surface. The specific landing site and flight operation are to be performed autonomously. This is required since the high gain antenna would not be deployed during descent, and because communication between Earth and Titan takes 70–90 minutes in each direction.

=== Landing site ===
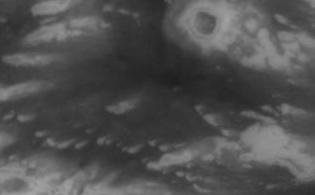
Dragonfly is planned to land on the sand dunes southwest of Selk crater (seen in the upper right), in an area called Ahmakiq Undae.

The Dragonfly rotorcraft is planned to initially land in an area of sand dunes called Ahmakiq Undae, located southwest of the Selk impact structure. It is planned to explore this region in a series of flights of up to 8 km (5 mi) each and acquire samples from compelling areas with a diverse geography. After landing, it is planned to travel to the Selk impact crater, where in addition to tholin organic compounds, there is evidence of past liquid water.

The Selk crater is a geologically young impact crater 90 km (56 mi) in diameter, located about 800 km (500 mi) north-northwest of the Huygens lander. (7.0°N 199.0°W) Infrared measurements and other spectra by the Cassini orbiter show that the adjacent terrain exhibits a brightness suggestive of differences in thermal structure or composition, possibly caused by cryovolcanism generated by the impact – a fluidized ejecta blanket and fluid flows, now water ice. Such a region featuring a mix of organic compounds and water ice is a compelling target to assess how far the prebiotic chemistry may have progressed at the surface.

On 13 April 2026, the International Astronomical Union (IAU) approved the official name for Dragonfly's landing site, Ahmakiq Undae, which was named after the Mayan wind spirit Ahmakiq.

== See also ==
- Atmosphere of Titan – Gas layer surrounding the moon Titan
- Exploration of Titan – Overview of the exploration of the moon Titan
- AVIATR – Concept mission to Titan – A mission concept of a Titan aircraft.
- Ingenuity – A rotorcraft that flew as part of Mars 2020 in April 2021.
- CAESAR (spacecraft) – Proposed NASA sample-return mission to a comet, other New Frontiers 4 finalist.
- Huygens (spacecraft) – First spacecraft to land on Titan.
- Titan Saturn System Mission – Cancelled NASA/ESA mission concept to Saturn
- Oceanus (Titan orbiter) – A Titan orbiter, also proposed for New Frontiers 4.
- Mars Aerial and Ground Global Intelligent Explorer – Mars solar aircraft concept
