= Mindolluin Montes =

Mountains on Titan

The Mindolluin Montes are a range of mountains on Titan, the largest moon of the planet Saturn. The range is located near Titan's equator, between 1–4° south and 205–213° east. It is located within the Adiri region, just west of the landing site of the Huygens probe.

The Mindolluin Montes are named after Mindolluin, one of the White Mountains in J. R. R. Tolkien's fictional world of Middle-earth. The name follows a convention that Titanean mountains are after mountains in Tolkien's work. It was formally announced on November 13, 2012.
