= Dilmun (Titan) =

Albedo feature on Titan, a satellite of Saturn

Dilmun is a region of high albedo on Titan, Saturn's natural satellite. It was discovered in the images transmitted by the Cassini spacecraft. It received the name of Dilmun, the garden paradise in Sumerian mythology.

Dilmun is located near the equator, centered on 15°N and 175 ° W. The large dark area of Shangri-la is located in the south.
