= Prime mission =

National Aeronautics and Space Administration
- NASA insignia

Agency overview
- Formed: July 29, 1958; 68 years ago
- Annual budget: $18.724 billion (Fiscal Year 2011)

The prime mission of a project is activities in the period of operation proposed by NASA when it was selected for funding. The United States Congress passes a budget detailing where Federal tax money is to be spent in the upcoming year. The budget includes funding for NASA, sometimes with explicit instructions on how to allocate money to the project level, based on NASA's recommendations. The duration of a project may vastly exceed the prime mission, and money spent on a project during its lifetime may vastly exceed the original budget.

Prime mission costs do not include those donated by other countries, by organizations, or by individuals.

== Post-prime missions ==
The prime mission is a funding period that may be followed by a post-prime mission (a "mission extension"). A post-prime mission is budget that is not allocated at the time of the prime mission, however by necessity the equipment for the post-prime mission may be designed and built into the project from the start. Post-prime missions applications may be to continue mission activities that were already defined, or to start new activities.

For US probes and satellites, NASA relies on the value of the science as determined by independent scientific peer review. As a part of the process, existing mission science teams submit a proposal describing what scientific work will be done, and at what cost. For international projects, any number of financial and political considerations may factor into a decision to conduct a post-prime mission.

== Project closeout ==
A project that is not given an extension, or that does not apply for one, begins a closeout. Typical activities include disposing of the system and supporting processes, archiving data, creating a "lessons learned" document, creating a final report, and reassigning personnel. When a closeout concludes, project work is discontinued. Certain limited costs, for example for data storage, may continue.

== Cost estimate challenges ==
NASA has worked with various cost models, borrowing heavily at the beginning from groundbreaking costing work by RAND, in the 1950s. However, by the time of the Space Shuttle costing was so difficult that neither private industry nor the government's methods were particularly reliable. The problems were politics, and lack of analogous data, and by 1983 NASA administrator Jim Beggs is characterized by an official JSC Web site as committing to Congress a cost for the ISS that was "a rather random number in light of known estimates and the fact that the conceptual design had never settled".

== See also ==
- Budget
- Space exploration
- Space policy of the United States
- United States federal budget
- Vision for Space Exploration
