= Selk (crater) =

Impact crater on the moon Titan

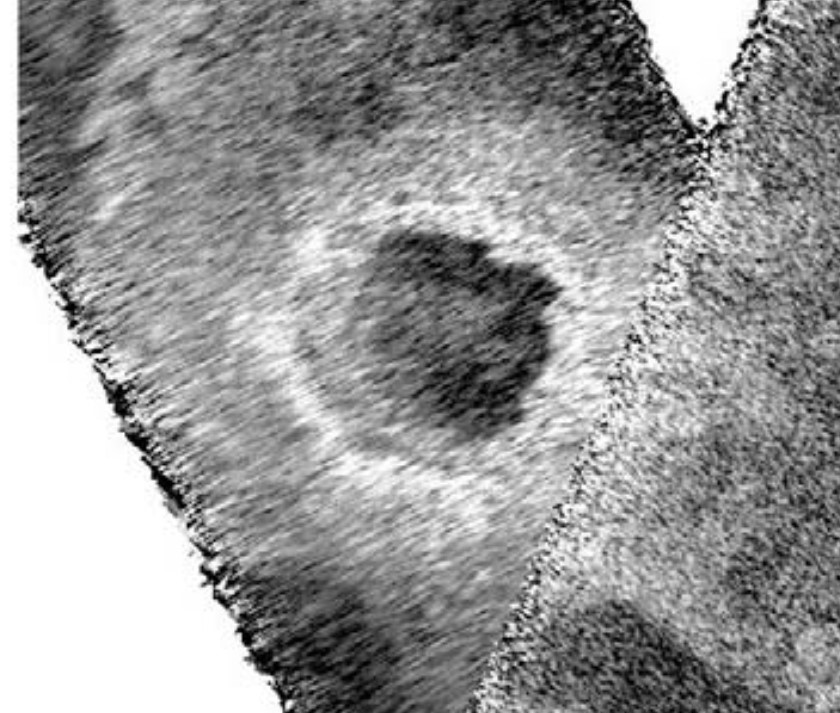
- A radar image of Selk by the Cassini probe
- Feature type: Impact crater
- Location: Titan
- Coordinates: 7.0°N 199.0°W
- Diameter: 90 km
- Discoverer: Cassini
- Eponym: Serket

Selk is a crater on Titan, a moon of Saturn, located at 7°N 199°W. It is a geologically young impact crater that measures approximately 90 kilometres (56 mi) in diameter. It was discovered in 2004 by the Cassini–Huygens mission during its first Titan flyby.

There is evidence that ice melted into liquid water when the crater formed, and mixed with organic compounds. This interaction may have formed molecules such as amino acids and other biomolecules. This possibility led mission planners to select the dunes to the Southeast of Selk as the initial landing site of the Dragonfly mission.

The crater is named after Serket, a goddess in Egyptian mythology, and was formally approved by the IAU in 2008.
