= Adiri (Titan) =

Albedo feature on Titan

Coordinates: 10°S 210°W

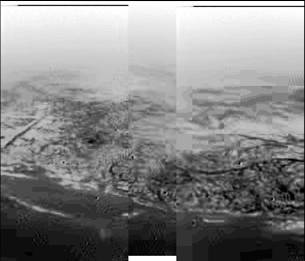
- Adiri as seen by Huygens
- Feature type: Albedo feature
- Eponym: paradise in Melanesian mythology

Adiri is a large, bright albedo feature on Saturn's moon Titan. It is named after the paradise in Melanesian mythology. It is located to the west of the large, dark region of Shangri-la.

Adiri is a region of high ground and appears to be riddled with drainage channels. The Huygens probe landed on a plain just off the northwest 'coast' of Adiri in 2005.
