= Huygens (spacecraft) =

First spacecraft to land on Titan

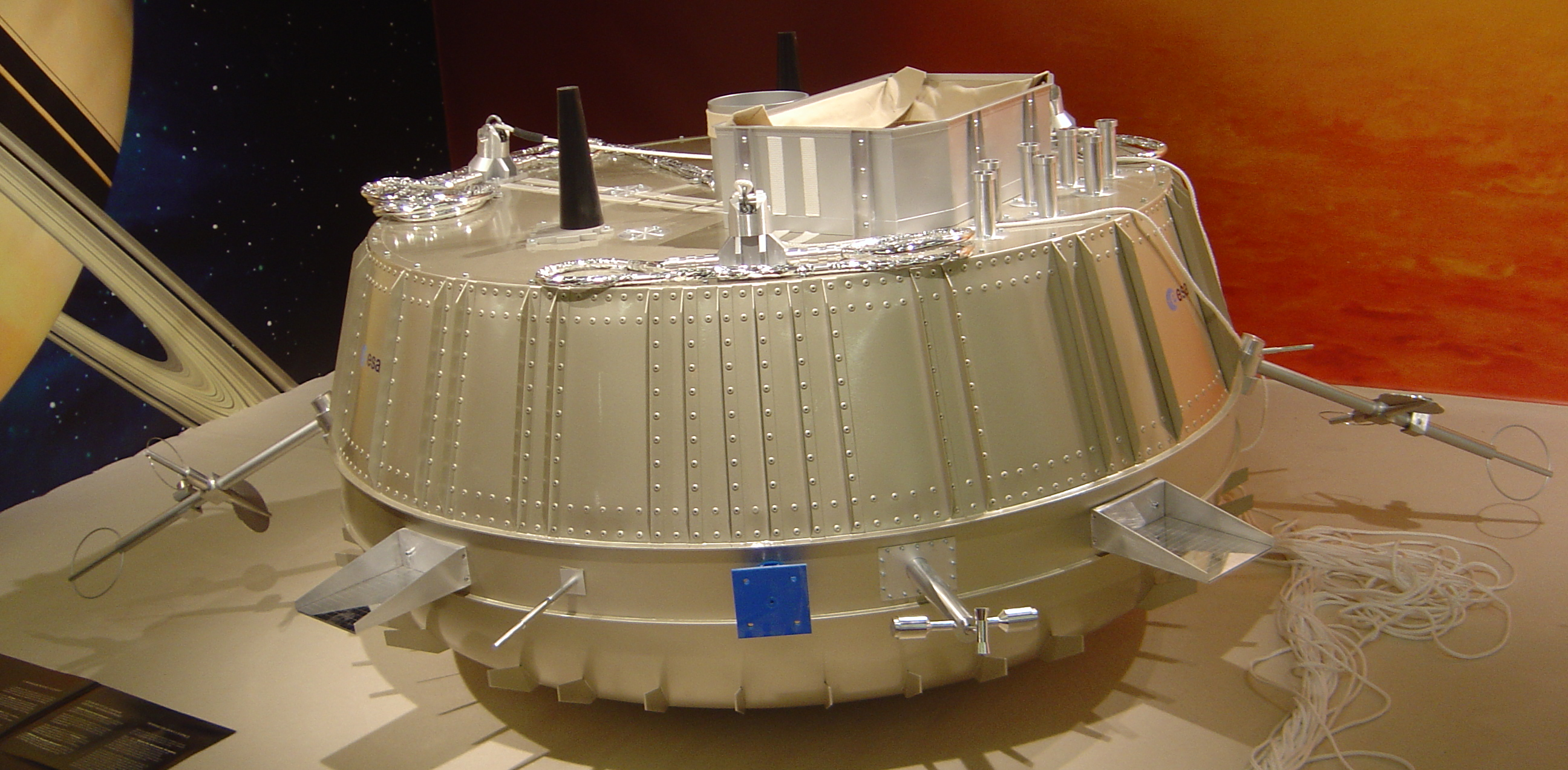
- A full-size replica of the Huygens probe, about 1.3 m (4.3 ft) across, presented in Paris in June 2005
- Mission type: Titan lander
- Operator: ESA / ASI / NASA
- COSPAR ID: 1997-061C
- Website: Huygens home page
- Mission duration: Overall: 7 years, 2 months, 30 days (Note: From launch alongside Cassini, up to last contact on the surface of Titan); 20 days, 11 hours, 37 minutes (Note: From its deployment from Cassini, solo cruise, EDL, up to last contact on the surface of Titan); Cassini Deployment/cruise to Titan: 20 days, 10 hours, 43 minutes; Prime mission: Total: 3 hours, 24 minutes; Descent: 2 hours, 30 minutes; Surface: 54 minutes

Spacecraft properties
- Manufacturer: Thales Alenia Space (then Aérospatiale)
- BOL mass: 318 kg (701 lb)
- Power: 1800 Wh total

Start of mission
- Launch date: 08:42, 15 October 1997 (UTC)
- Rocket: Titan IV(401)B/ Centaur-T B-33
- Launch site: Cape Canaveral SLC-40
- Contractor: Lockheed Martin
- Deployed from: Cassini
- Deployment date: 02:00, 25 December 2004 (UTC)

End of mission
- Disposal: Communications loss (Note: Huygens' mission ended when Cassini stopped acquiring data from the probe as the landing site dropped below Titan's local horizon)
- Last contact: 13:37, 14 January 2005 (UTC)

Titan lander
- Landing date: 12:43, 14 January 2005 (UTC)
- Landing site: 10.573°S 192.335°W (near the Adiri Region)
Instruments
- HASI: Huygens Atmospheric Structure Instrument
- DWE: Doppler Wind Experiment
- DISR: Descent Imager/Spectral Radiometer
- GC/MS: Gas Chromatograph Mass Spectrometer
- ACP: Aerosol Collector and Pyrolyser
- SSP: Surface Science Package
- Contemporary ESA insignia (2000s) Horizon 2000 (Science Programme)

Huygens (/ˈhɔɪɡənz/ HOY-gənz) was an atmospheric entry robotic space probe that landed successfully on Saturn's moon Titan in 2005. Built and operated by the European Space Agency (ESA), and launched by NASA, it was part of the Cassini–Huygens mission and became the first spacecraft to land on Titan and the farthest landing from Earth a spacecraft has ever made. The probe was named after the 17th-century Dutch astronomer Christiaan Huygens, who discovered Titan in 1655.

The combined Cassini–Huygens spacecraft was launched from Earth on 15 October 1997. Huygens separated from the Cassini orbiter on 25 December 2004, and landed on Titan on 14 January 2005 near the Adiri region. Huygens's landing is so far the only one accomplished in the outer Solar System and on a moon other than Earth's.

Huygens touched down on land, although the possibility that it would touch down in an ocean was also taken into account in its design. The probe was designed to gather data for a few hours in the atmosphere, and possibly a short time at the surface. It continued to send data for about 90 minutes after touchdown.

== Overview ==
Huygens was designed to enter and brake in Titan's atmosphere and parachute a fully instrumented robotic laboratory to the surface. When the mission was planned, it was not yet certain whether the landing site would be a mountain range, a flat plain, an ocean, or something else, and it was thought that analysis of data from Cassini would help to answer these questions.

Based on pictures taken by Cassini 1,200 km (750 mi) above Titan, the landing site appeared to be a shoreline. Assuming the landing site could be non-solid, Huygens was designed to survive the impact, splash down on a liquid surface on Titan, and send back data for several minutes under these conditions. If that occurred it was expected to be the first time a human-made probe would land in an extraterrestrial ocean. The spacecraft had no more than three hours of battery life, most of which was planned to be used during the descent. Engineers expected to get at most only 30 minutes of data from the surface.

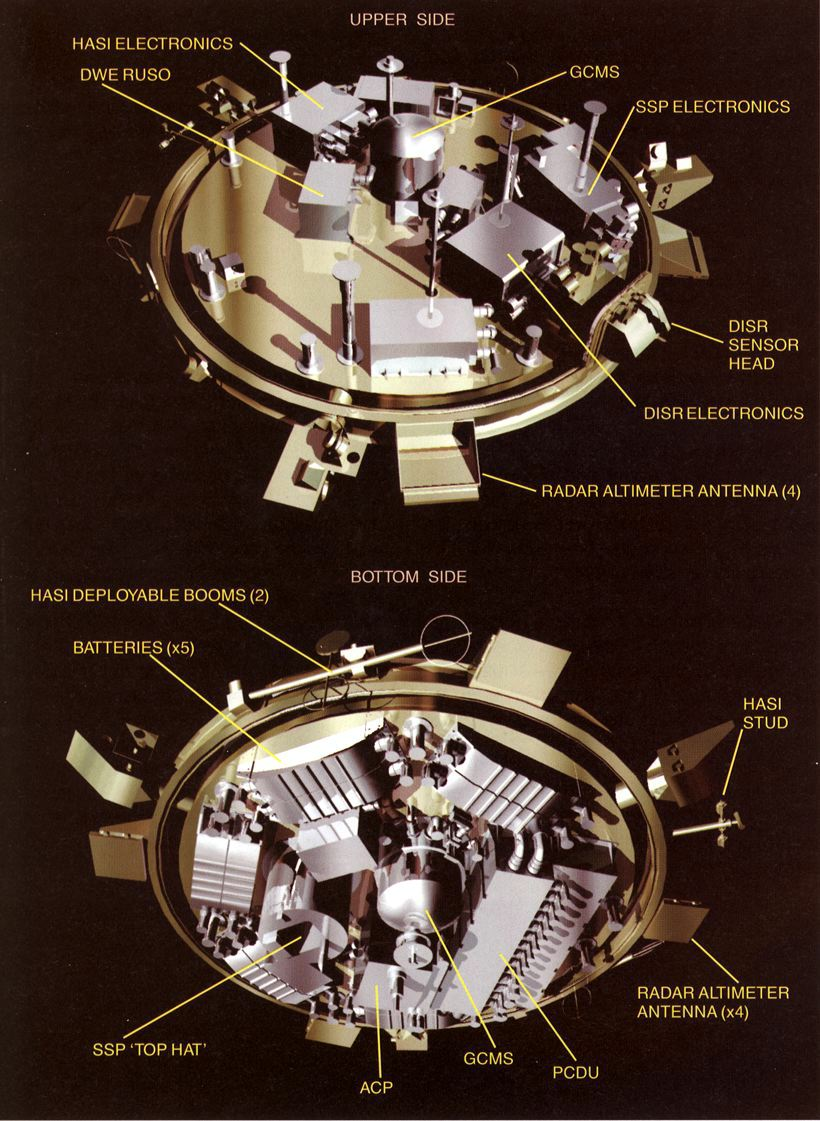
Cutaway image of Huygens

The Huygens probe system consists of the 318 kg (701 lb) probe itself, which descended to Titan, and the 30 kg (66 lb) probe support equipment (PSE), which remained attached to the orbiting spacecraft. Huygens' heat shield was 2.7 m (8.9 ft) in diameter. After ejecting the shield, the probe was 1.3 m (4.3 ft) in diameter. The PSE included the electronics necessary to track the probe, to recover the data gathered during its descent, and to process and deliver the data to the orbiter, from where it was transmitted or "downlinked" to the Earth.

The probe remained dormant throughout the 6.7-year interplanetary cruise, except for semiannual health checks. These checkouts followed preprogrammed descent scenario sequences as closely as possible, and the results were relayed to Earth for examination by system and payload experts.

Prior to the probe's separation from the orbiter on 25 December 2004, a final health check was performed. The "coast" timer was loaded with the precise time necessary to turn on the probe systems (15 minutes before its encounter with Titan's atmosphere), then the probe detached from the orbiter and coasted in free space to Titan in 22 days with no systems active except for its wake-up timer.

The main mission phase was a parachute descent through Titan's atmosphere. The batteries and all other resources were sized for a Huygens mission duration of 153 minutes, corresponding to a maximum descent time of 2.5 hours plus at least 3 additional minutes (and possibly a half-hour or more) on Titan's surface. The probe's radio link was activated early in the descent phase, and the orbiter "listened" to the probe for the next three hours, including the descent phase, and the first thirty minutes after touchdown. Not long after the end of this three-hour communication window, Cassini's high-gain antenna (HGA) was turned away from Titan and towards Earth.

Very large radio telescopes on Earth were also listening to Huygens' 10-watt transmission using the technique of very long baseline interferometry and aperture synthesis mode. At 11:25 CET on 14 January, the Robert C. Byrd Green Bank Telescope (GBT) in West Virginia detected the carrier signal from Huygens. The GBT continued to detect the carrier signal well after Cassini stopped listening to the incoming data stream. In addition to the GBT, eight of the ten telescopes of the continent-wide VLBA in North America, located at Pie Town and Los Alamos, New Mexico; Fort Davis, Texas; North Liberty, Iowa; Kitt Peak, Arizona; Brewster, Washington; Owens Valley, California; and Mauna Kea, Hawaii, also listened for the Huygens signal.

The signal strength received on Earth from Huygens was comparable to that from the Galileo probe (the Jupiter atmospheric descent probe) as received by the VLA, and was therefore too weak to detect in real time because of the signal modulation by the (then) unknown telemetry. Instead, wide-band recordings of the probe signal were made throughout the three-hour descent. After the probe telemetry was finished being relayed from Cassini to Earth, the now-known data modulation was stripped off the recorded signal, leaving a pure carrier that could be integrated over several seconds to determine the probe frequency. It was expected that through analysis of the Doppler shifting of Huygens' signal as it descended through the atmosphere of Titan, wind speed and direction could be determined with some degree of accuracy. A position of Huygens's landing site on Titan was found with precision (within one km — one km on Titan measures 1.3 arcminutes of latitude and longitude at the equator) using the Doppler data at a distance from Earth of about 1.2 billion km (8.0 AU). The probe landed on the surface of the moon at 10.573°S 192.335°W. A similar technique was used to determine the landing site of the Mars exploration rovers by listening to their telemetry alone.

== Findings ==
Huygens landed at around 12:43 UTC on January 14, 2005 with an impact speed similar to dropping a ball on Earth from a height of about 1 m (3 ft). It made a dent 12 cm (4.7 in) deep, before bouncing onto a flat surface, and sliding 30 to 40 cm (12 to 16 in) across the surface. It slowed due to friction with the surface and, upon coming to its final resting place, wobbled back and forth five times. Huygens' sensors continued to detect small vibrations for another two seconds, until motion subsided about ten seconds after touchdown. The probe kicked up a cloud of dust (most likely organic aerosols which drizzle out of the atmosphere) which remained suspended in the atmosphere for about four seconds by the impact.

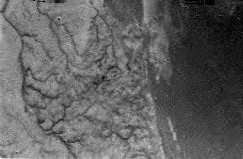
The first image released, taken from an altitude of 16 km (9.9 mi), showing what are speculated to be drainage channels flowing to a possible shoreline. The darker areas are flat plains, while the lighter areas represent high ground.

At the landing site there were indications of pebbles of water ice scattered over an orange surface, the majority of which is covered by a thin haze of methane. Early aerial imaging of Titan from Huygens was consistent with the presence of large bodies of liquid on the surface. The initial photos of Titan before landing showed what appeared to be large drainage channels crossing the lighter colored mainland into a dark sea. Some of the photos suggested islands and a mist shrouded coastline. Subsequent analysis of the probe's trajectory indicated that, in fact, Huygens had landed within the dark 'sea' region in the photos. The photos from the surface of a dry lakebed-like landscape suggest that while there is evidence of liquid acting on the surface recently, hydrocarbon lakes and/or seas might not currently exist at the Huygens landing site. Further data from the Cassini Mission, however, definitely confirmed the existence of permanent liquid hydrocarbon lakes in the polar regions of Titan (see Lakes of Titan). Long-standing tropical hydrocarbon lakes were also discovered in 2012 (including one not far from the Huygens landing site in the Shangri-La region which is about half the size of Utah's Great Salt Lake, with a depth of at least 1 m (3 ft)). The likely supplier in dry desert areas is probably underground aquifers; in other words, the arid equatorial regions of Titan contain "oases".

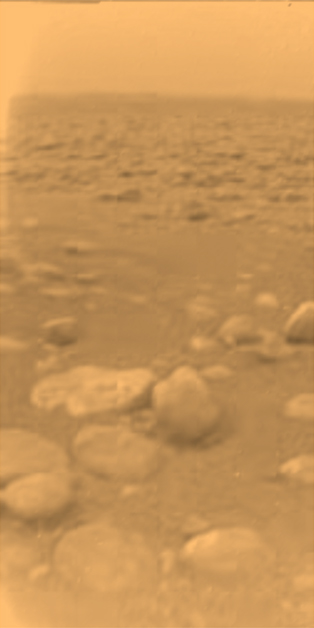
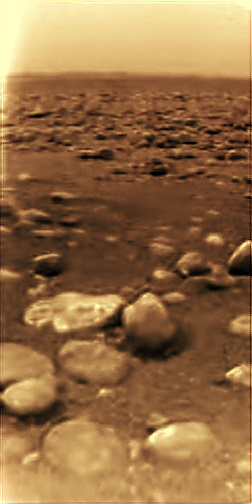
In situ image of Titan's surface from Huygens (left and right images have different image processing). Globules (probably made of water ice) 10–15 cm in size lie above darker, finer-grained substrate in a variable spatial distribution. Brightening of the upper left side of several rocks suggests solar illumination from that direction, implying a southerly view, which agrees with preliminary evidence from other data sets. A region with a relatively low number of rocks lies between clusters of rocks in the foreground and the background and matches the general orientation of channel-like features in the low-altitude images taken from under 7 km (4.3 mi) altitude.

The surface was initially reported to be a clay-like "material which might have a thin crust followed by a region of relative uniform consistency." One ESA scientist compared the texture and colour of Titan's surface to a crème brûlée (that is, a hard surface covering a sticky mud-like subsurface). Subsequent analysis of the data suggests that surface consistency readings were likely caused by Huygens pushing a large pebble into the ground as it landed, and that the surface is better described as a "sand" made of ice grains or snow that has been frozen on top. The images taken after the probe's landing show a flat plain covered in pebbles. The pebbles, which may be made of hydrocarbon-coated water ice, are somewhat rounded, which may indicate the action of fluids on them. The rocks appear to be rounded, size-selected and size-layered as though located in the bed of a stream within a dark lakebed, which consists of finer-grained material. No pebbles larger than 15 cm (5.9 in) across were spotted, while rocks smaller than 5 cm (2.0 in) are rare on the Huygens landing site. This implies large pebbles cannot be transported to the lakebed, while small rocks are quickly removed from the surface.

The temperature at the landing site was 93.8 K (−179.3 °C; −290.8 °F) and pressure of 1,467.6 mbar (1.4484 atm), implying a methane abundance of 5 ± 1% and methane relative humidity of 50% near the surface. Therefore, ground fogs caused by methane in the neighborhood of the landing site are unlikely. Thermometers indicated that heat left Huygens so quickly that the ground must have been damp, and one image shows light reflected by a dewdrop as it falls across the camera's field of view. On Titan, the feeble sunlight allows only about one centimetre of evaporation per year (versus one metre of water on Earth), but the atmosphere can hold the equivalent of about 10 m (30 ft) of liquid before rain forms vs. only a few centimeters on Earth. So Titan's weather is expected to feature torrential downpours causing flash floods, interspersed by decades or centuries of drought.

Huygens found the brightness of the surface of Titan (at time of landing) to be about one thousand times dimmer than full solar illumination on Earth (or 500 times brighter than illumination by full moonlight)—that is, the illumination level experienced about ten minutes after sunset on Earth, approximately late civil twilight. The color of the sky and the scene on Titan is mainly orange due to the much greater attenuation of blue light by Titan's haze relative to red light. The Sun (which was comparatively high in the sky when Huygens landed) would be visible as a small, bright spot, one tenth the size of the solar disk seen from Earth, and comparable in size and brightness to a car headlight seen from about 150 m (500 ft). It casts sharp shadows, but of low contrast as 90% of the illumination comes from the sky.

== Detailed Huygens activity timeline ==
Animation of Huygens's trajectory from December 25, 2004 to January 14, 2005 Huygens · Titan · Saturn

- Huygens separated from Cassini orbiter at 02:00 UTC on 25 December 2004 in Spacecraft Event Time.
- Huygens entered Titan's atmosphere at 10:13 UTC on 14 January 2005 in SCET, according to ESA.
- The probe landed on the surface of Titan at about 10.6°S, 192.3°W around 12:43 UTC in SCET (2 hours 30 minutes after atmospheric entry).(1.)

There was a transit of the Earth and Moon across the Sun as seen from Saturn/Titan just hours before the landing. Huygens entered the upper layer of Titan's atmosphere 2.7 hours after the end of the transit of the Earth, or only one or two minutes after the end of the transit of the Moon. However, the transit did not interfere with the Cassini orbiter or Huygens probe, for two reasons. First, although they could not receive any signal from Earth because it was in front of the Sun, Earth could still listen to them. Second, Huygens did not send any readable data directly to Earth. Rather, it transmitted data to the Cassini orbiter, which later relayed to Earth the data received.

== Instrumentation ==
Huygens had six instruments aboard that took in a wide range of scientific data as the probe descended through Titan's atmosphere. The six instruments are:

=== Huygens Atmospheric Structure Instrument (HASI) ===
This instrument contains a suite of sensors that measured the physical and electrical properties of Titan's atmosphere. Accelerometers measured forces in all three axes as the probe descended through the atmosphere. With the aerodynamic properties of the probe already known, it was possible to determine the density of Titan's atmosphere and to detect wind gusts. The probe was designed so that in the event of a landing on a liquid surface, its motion due to waves would also have been measurable. Temperature and pressure sensors measured the thermal properties of the atmosphere. The Permittivity and Electromagnetic Wave Analyzer component measured the electron and ion (i.e., positively charged particle) conductivities of the atmosphere and searched for electromagnetic wave activity. On the surface of Titan, the electrical conductivity and permittivity (i.e., the ratio of electric displacement field to its electric field) of the surface material was measured. The HASI subsystem also contains a microphone, which was used to record any acoustic events during probe's descent and landing)

=== Doppler Wind Experiment (DWE) ===
This experiment used an ultra-stable oscillator which provided a precise S-band carrier frequency that allowed the Cassini orbiter to accurately determine Huygens's radial velocity with respect to Cassini via the Doppler Effect. The wind-induced horizontal motion from Huygens would have been derived from the measured Doppler shift measurements, corrected for all known orbit and propagation effects. The swinging motion of the probe beneath its parachute due to atmospheric properties may also have been detected. Failure of ground controllers to turn on the receiver in the Cassini orbiter caused the loss of this data. Earth-based radio telescopes were able to reconstruct some of it. Measurements started 150 km (93 mi) above Titan's surface, where Huygens was blown eastwards at more than 400 km/h (250 mph), agreeing with earlier measurements of the winds at 200 km (120 mi) altitude, made over the past few years using telescopes. Between 60 and 80 km (37 and 50 mi), Huygens was buffeted by rapidly fluctuating winds, which are thought to be vertical wind shear. At ground level, the Earth-based doppler shift and VLBI measurements show gentle winds of a few metres per second, roughly in line with expectations.

=== Descent Imager/Spectral Radiometer (DISR) ===
DISR data visualisation during Huygens's descent

As Huygens was primarily an atmospheric mission, the DISR instrument was optimized to study the radiation balance inside Titan's atmosphere. Its visible and infrared spectrometers and violet photometers measured the up- and downward radiant flux from an altitude of 145 km (90 mi) down to the surface. Solar aureole cameras measured how scattering by aerosols varies the intensity directly around the Sun. Three imagers, sharing the same CCD, periodically imaged a swath of around 30 degrees wide, ranging from almost nadir to just above the horizon. Aided by the slowly spinning probe they would build up a full mosaic of the landing site, which, surprisingly, became clearly visible only below 25 km (16 mi) altitude. All measurements were timed by aid of a shadow bar, which would tell DISR when the Sun had passed through the field of view. Unfortunately, this scheme was upset by the fact that Huygens rotated in a direction opposite to that expected. Just before landing a lamp was switched on to illuminate the surface, which enabled measurements of the surface reflectance at wavelengths which are completely blocked out by atmospheric methane absorption.

DISR was developed at the Lunar and Planetary Laboratory at the University of Arizona under the direction of Martin Tomasko, with several European institutes contributing to the hardware. "The scientific objectives of the experiment fall into four areas including (1) measurement of the solar heating profile for studies of the thermal balance of Titan; (2) imaging and spectral reflection measurements of the surface for studies of the composition, topography, and physical processes which form the surface as well as for direct measurements of the wind profile during the descent; (3) measurements of the brightness and degree of linear polarization of scattered sunlight including the solar aureole together with measurements of the extinction optical depth of the aerosols as a function of wavelength and altitude to study the size, shape, vertical distribution, optical properties, sources and sinks of aerosols in Titan’s atmosphere; and (4) measurements of the spectrum of downward solar flux to study the composition of the atmosphere, especially the mixing ratio profile of methane throughout the descent."

=== Gas Chromatograph Mass Spectrometer (GC/MS) ===
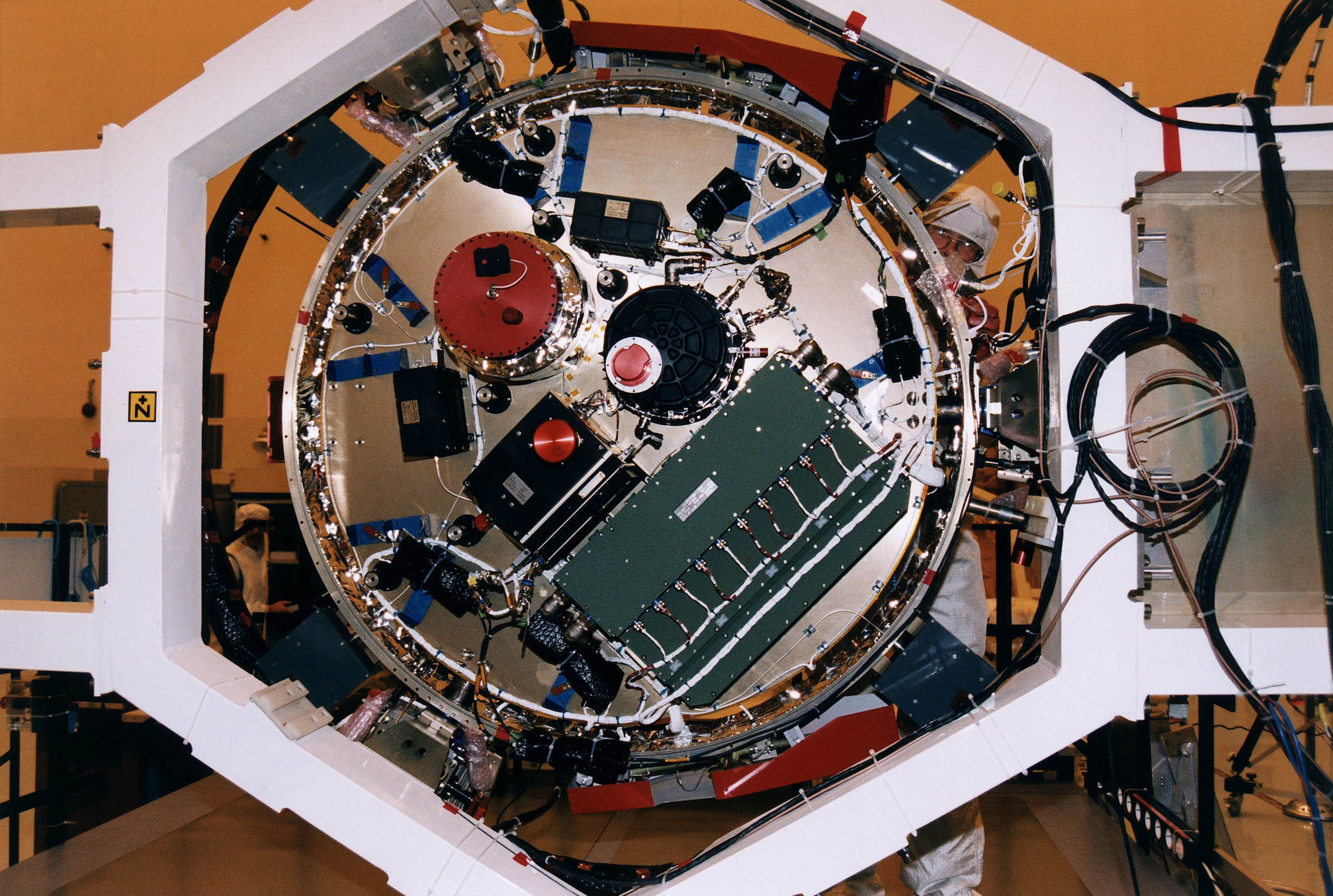
A worker in the Payload Hazardous Servicing Facility (PHSF) stands behind the bottom side of the experiment platform for Huygens.

This instrument is a gas chemical analyzer that was designed to identify and measure chemicals in Titan's atmosphere. It was equipped with samplers that were filled at high altitude for analysis. The mass spectrometer, a high-voltage quadrupole, collected data to build a model of the molecular masses of each gas, and a more powerful separation of molecular and isotopic species was accomplished by the gas chromatograph. During descent, the GC/MS also analyzed pyrolysis products (i.e., samples altered by heating) passed to it from the Aerosol Collector Pyrolyser. Finally, the GC/MS measured the composition of Titan's surface. This investigation was made possible by heating the GC/MS instrument just prior to impact in order to vaporize the surface material upon contact. The GC/MS was developed by Goddard Space Flight Center and the University of Michigan's Space Physics Research Lab.

=== Aerosol Collector and Pyrolyser (ACP) ===
The ACP experiment drew in aerosol particles from the atmosphere through filters, then heated the trapped samples in ovens (using the process of pyrolysis) to vaporize volatiles and decompose the complex organic materials. The products were flushed along a pipe to the GC/MS instrument for analysis. Two filters were provided to collect samples at different altitudes. The ACP was developed by a (French) ESA team at the Laboratoire Inter-Universitaire des Systèmes Atmosphériques (LISA).

=== Surface Science Package (SSP) ===
The SSP contained a number of sensors designed to determine the physical properties of Titan's surface at the point of impact, whether the surface was solid or liquid. An acoustic sounder, activated during the last 100 m (300 ft) of the descent, continuously determined the distance to the surface, measuring the rate of descent and the surface roughness (e.g., due to waves). The instrument was designed so that if the surface were liquid, the sounder would measure the speed of sound in the "ocean" and possibly also the subsurface structure (depth). During descent, measurements of the speed of sound gave information on atmospheric composition and temperature, and an accelerometer recorded the deceleration profile at impact, indicating the hardness and structure of the surface. A tilt sensor measured pendulum motion during the descent and was also designed to indicate the probe's attitude after landing and show any motion due to waves. If the surface had been liquid, other sensors would also have measured its density, temperature, thermal conductivity, heat capacity, electrical properties (permittivity and conductivity) and refractive index (using a critical angle refractometer). A penetrometer instrument, that protruded 55 mm (2.2 in) past the bottom of the Huygens descent module, was used to create a penetrometer trace as Huygens landed on the surface. This was done by measuring the force exerted on the instrument by the body's surface as it broke through and was pushed down into the body by the landing. The trace shows this force as a function of time over a period of about 400 ms. The trace has an initial spike which suggests that the instrument hit one of the icy pebbles on the surface photographed by the DISR camera.

The Huygens SSP was developed by the Space Sciences Department of the University of Kent and the Rutherford Appleton Laboratory Space Science Department (now RAL Space) under the direction of Professor John Zarnecki. The SSP research and responsibility transferred to the Open University when John Zarnecki transferred in 2000.

== Spacecraft design ==
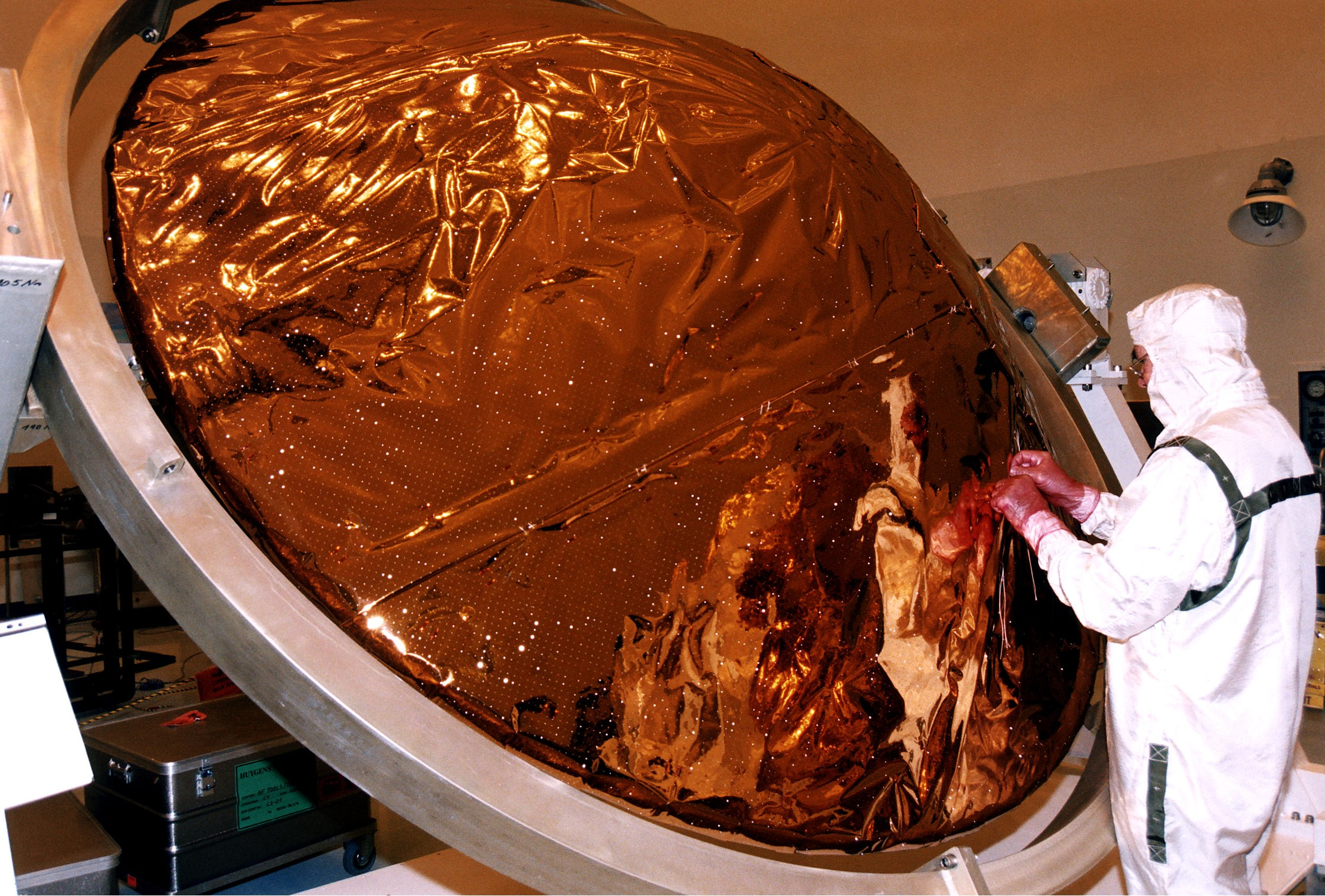
Application of multi-layer insulation shimmers under bright lighting during final assembly. The gold colour of the MLI is due to light reflecting from the aluminium coating on the back of sheets of amber coloured Kapton.

Huygens was built under the Prime Contractorship of Aérospatiale in its Cannes Mandelieu Space Center, France, now part of Thales Alenia Space. The heat shield system was built under the responsibility of Aérospatiale near Bordeaux, now part of Airbus Defence and Space.

=== Parachute ===
Martin-Baker Space Systems was responsible for Huygens' parachute systems and the structural components, mechanisms and pyrotechnics that control the probe's descent onto Titan. IRVIN-GQ was responsible for the definition of the structure of each of Huygens' parachutes. Irvin worked on the probe's descent control sub-system under contract to Martin-Baker Space Systems.

== Design flaws ==
=== Cassini's telemetry relay ===
Long after launch, a few persistent engineers discovered that the communication equipment on Cassini had a potentially fatal design flaw, which would have caused the loss of all data transmitted by Huygens.

Since Huygens was too small to transmit directly to Earth, it was designed to transmit the telemetry data obtained while descending through Titan's atmosphere by radio to Cassini, which would in turn relay it to Earth using its large 4 m (13 ft) diameter main antenna. Some engineers, most notably ESA ESOC employees Claudio Sollazzo and Boris Smeds, felt uneasy about the fact that, in their opinion, this feature had not been tested before launch under sufficiently realistic conditions. Smeds managed, with some difficulty, to persuade superiors to perform additional tests while Cassini was in flight. In early 2000, he sent simulated telemetry data at varying power and Doppler shift levels from Earth to Cassini. It turned out that Cassini was unable to relay the data correctly.

This was because under the original flight plan, when Huygens was to descend to Titan, it would have accelerated relative to Cassini, causing the Doppler shift of its signal to vary. Consequently, the hardware of Cassini's receiver was designed to be able to receive over a range of shifted frequencies. However, the firmware failed to take into account that the Doppler shift would have changed not only the carrier frequency, but also the timing of the payload bits, coded by phase-shift keying at 8192 bits per second.

Reprogramming the firmware was impossible, and as a solution the trajectory had to be changed. Huygens detached a month later than originally planned (December 2004 instead of November) and approached Titan in such a way that its transmissions travelled perpendicular to its direction of motion relative to Cassini, greatly reducing the Doppler shift.

The trajectory change overcame the design flaw for the most part, and data transmission succeeded, although the information from one of the two radio channels was lost due to an unrelated error.

=== Channel A data loss ===
Huygens was programmed to transmit telemetry and scientific data to the Cassini orbiter for relay to Earth using two redundant S-band radio systems, referred to as Channel A and B, or Chain A and B. Channel A was the sole path for an experiment to measure wind speeds by studying tiny frequency changes caused by Huygens' motion. In one other deliberate departure from full redundancy, pictures from the descent imager were split, with each channel carrying 350 pictures.

Cassini never listened to channel A because of an error in the sequence of commands sent to the spacecraft. The receiver on the orbiter was never commanded to turn on, according to officials with the European Space Agency. ESA announced that the error was a mistake on their part, the missing command was part of a command sequence developed by ESA for the Huygens mission, and that it was executed by Cassini as delivered.

Because Channel A was not used, only 350 pictures were received instead of the 700 planned. All Doppler radio measurements between Cassini and Huygens were lost as well. Doppler radio measurements of Huygens from Earth were made, although they were not as accurate as the lost measurements that Cassini made. The use of accelerometer sensors on Huygens and VLBI tracking of the position of the Huygens probe from Earth allowed reasonably accurate wind speed and direction calculations to be made.

== Contributions from citizen science projects ==
The fact that Huygens rotated in the opposite direction than planned delayed the creation of surface mosaics from the raw data by the project team for many months. On the other hand, this provided an opportunity for some citizen science projects to attempt the task of assembling the surface mosaics. This was possible because the European Space Agency approved the publication of the DISR raw images and gave the permission for citizen scientists to present their results on the internet. Some of these citizen science projects have received a lot of attention in the scientific community, in popular scientific journals, and in the public media. While the media liked to present the story of amateurs outperforming the professionals, most of the participants understood themselves as citizen scientists, and the driving force behind their work was a desire to find out and show as much as possible of the hitherto unknown surface of Titan. Some enthusiasts' projects were the first to publish surface mosaics and panoramas of Titan on the day after Huygens landed. Another project worked with the Huygens DISR data for several months until virtually all images with recognizable structures were able to be assigned to their correct position, resulting in comprehensive mosaics and panoramas. A surface panorama from this citizen science project was finally published in the context of a Nature review by Joseph Burns.

== Landing site ==
The probe landed on the surface of Titan at 10.573°S 192.335°W.

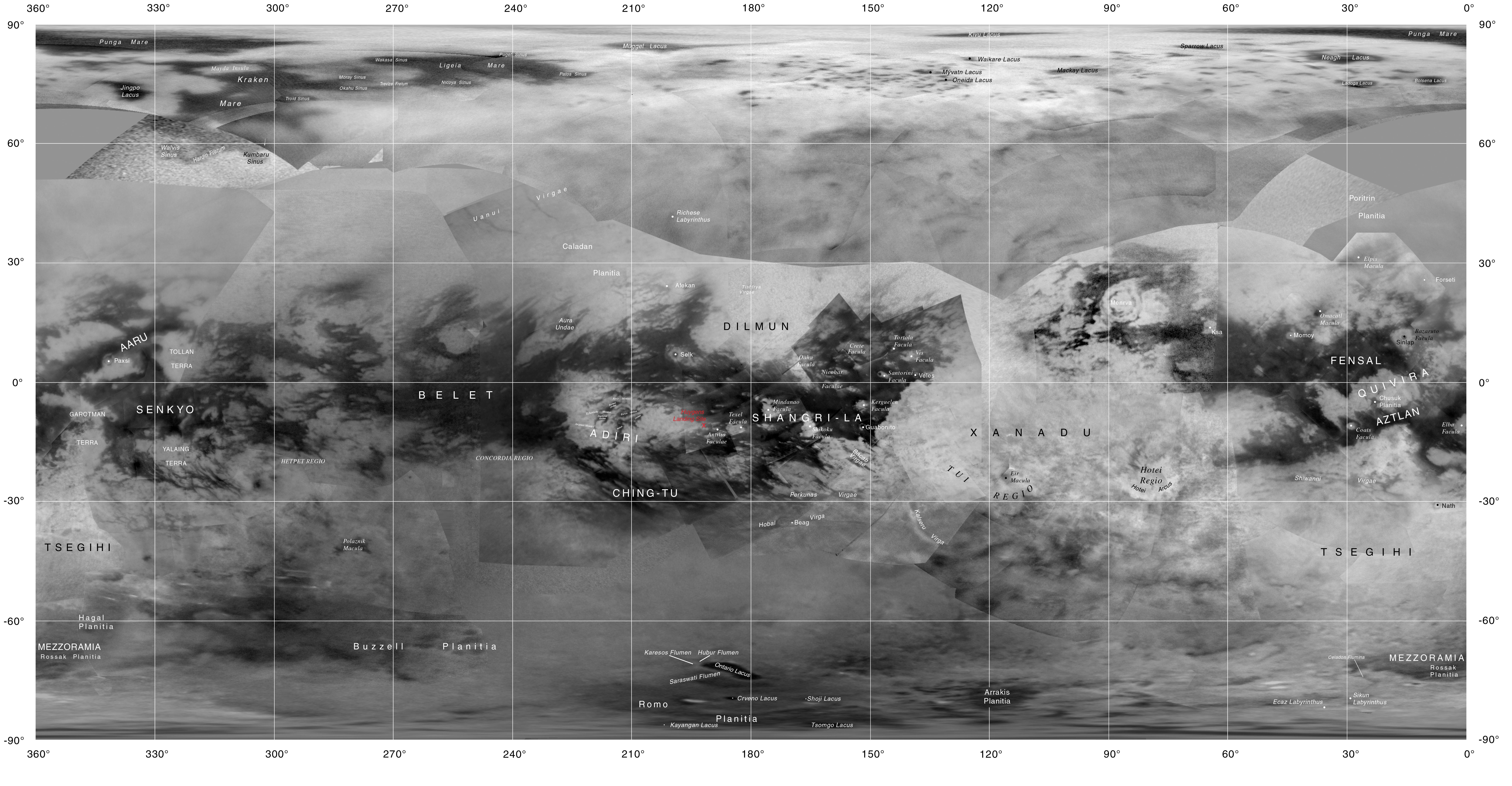
The red cross marks the landing site of Huygens. The bright region to the right is Xanadu Region.

== See also ==
- List of European Space Agency programmes and missions
- Cassini retirement
- Europlanet
- List of missions to the outer planets
- Titan Mare Explorer
- Titan Saturn System Mission
- Dragonfly (Titan space probe)

== Bibliography ==
- Nature 438, Dec. 2005 - The results analyzed in nine articles, letters to the editor and related media are available with free access online.
