= Galileo project =

American space program to study Jupiter (1989–2003)

Galileo
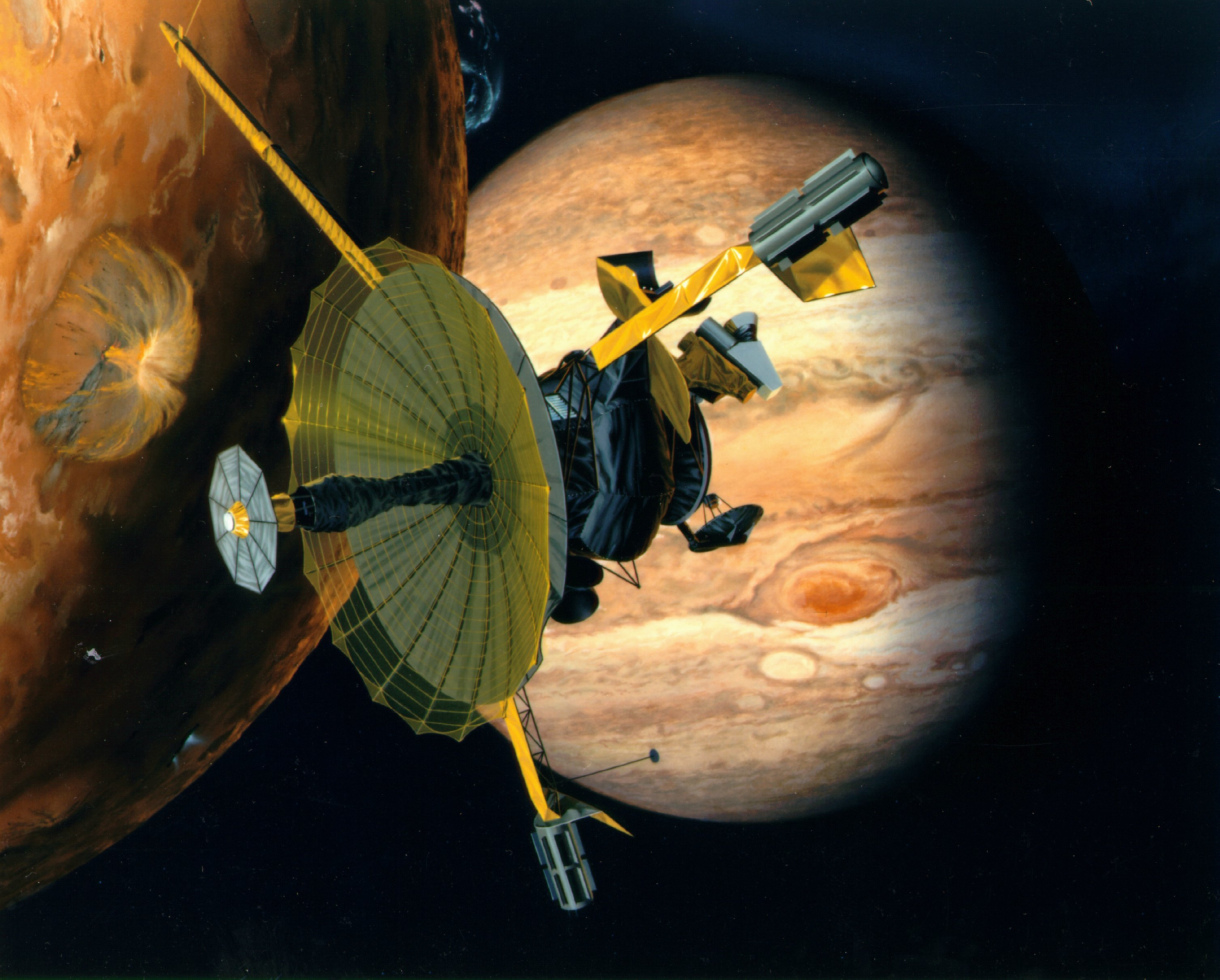
- Artist's concept of Galileo at Io with Jupiter in the background. The high-gain antenna is fully deployed in this illustration but in reality the antenna failed to extend.
- Names: Jupiter Orbiter Probe
- Mission type: Jupiter orbiter
- Operator: NASA
- COSPAR ID: 1989-084B
- SATCAT no.: 20298
- Website: solarsystem.nasa.gov/galileo/
- Mission duration: Planned: 8 years, 1 month, 19 days; Jupiter orbit: 7 years, 9 months, 13 days; Final: 13 years, 11 months, 3 days
- Distance travelled: 4,631,778,000 km (2.88 billion mi)

Spacecraft properties
- Manufacturer: Jet Propulsion Laboratory; Messerschmitt-Bölkow-Blohm; General Electric; Hughes Aircraft Company
- Launch mass: Total: 2,560 kg (5,640 lb); Orbiter: 2,220 kg (4,890 lb); Probe: 340 kg (750 lb)
- Dry mass: Orbiter: 1,880 kg (4,140 lb); Probe: 340 kg (750 lb)
- Payload mass: Orbiter: 118 kg (260 lb); Probe: 30 kg (66 lb)
- Power: Orbiter: 570 watts; Probe: 730 watt-hours

Start of mission
- Launch date: October 18, 1989, 16:53:40 UTC
- Rocket: Space Shuttle Atlantis; STS-34/IUS
- Launch site: Kennedy LC-39B
- Entered service: December 8, 1995, 01:16 UTC SCET

End of mission
- Disposal: Controlled entry into Jupiter
- Decay date: September 21, 2003, 18:57:18 UTC

Flyby of Venus (gravity assist)
- Closest approach: February 10, 1990
- Distance: 16,000 kilometers (9,900 mi)

Flyby of Earth (gravity assist)
- Closest approach: December 8, 1990 and December 8, 1992
- Distance: 960 kilometers (600 mi) and 303 kilometers (188 mi)

Flyby of 951 Gaspra
- Closest approach: October 29, 1991
- Distance: 1,601 kilometers (995 mi)

Flyby of 243 Ida
- Closest approach: August 28, 1993
- Distance: 2,400 kilometers (1,500 mi)

Jupiter orbiter
- Spacecraft component: Orbiter
- Orbital insertion: December 8, 1995, 01:16 UTC SCET

Jupiter atmospheric probe
- Spacecraft component: Probe
- Atmospheric entry: December 7, 1995, 22:04 UTC SCET
- Impact site: 06°05′N 04°04′W at entry interface
Instruments
- SSI: Solid-State Imager
- NIMS: Near-Infrared Mapping Spectrometer
- UVS: Ultraviolet Spectrometer
- PPR: Photopolarimeter-Radiometer
- DDS: Dust Detector Subsystem
- EPD: Energetic Particles Detector
- HIC: Heavy Ion Counter
- MAG: Magnetometer
- PLS: Plasma Subsystem
- PWS: Plasma Wave Subsystem
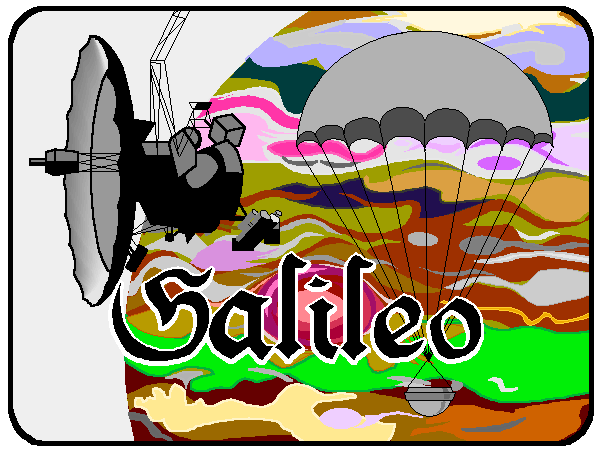
- Large Strategic Science Missions; Planetary Science Division

Galileo was an American robotic space program that studied the planet Jupiter and its moons, as well as several other Solar System bodies. Named after the Italian astronomer Galileo Galilei, the Galileo spacecraft consisted of an orbiter and an atmospheric entry probe. It was delivered into Earth orbit on October 18, 1989, by Space Shuttle Atlantis on the STS-34 mission, and arrived at Jupiter on December 7, 1995, after gravity assist flybys of Venus and Earth, and became the first spacecraft to orbit Jupiter. The spacecraft then launched the first probe to directly measure its atmosphere. Despite suffering major antenna problems, Galileo achieved the first asteroid flyby, of 951 Gaspra, and discovered the first asteroid moon, Dactyl, around 243 Ida. In 1994, Galileo observed Comet Shoemaker–Levy 9's collision with Jupiter.

Jupiter's atmospheric composition and ammonia clouds were recorded, as were the volcanism and plasma interactions on Io with Jupiter's atmosphere. The data Galileo collected supported the theory of a liquid ocean under the icy surface of Europa, and there were indications of similar liquid-saltwater layers under the surfaces of Ganymede and Callisto. Ganymede was shown to possess a magnetic field and the spacecraft found new evidence for exospheres around Europa, Ganymede, and Callisto. Galileo also discovered that Jupiter's faint ring system consists of dust from impact events on the four small inner moons. The extent and structure of Jupiter's magnetosphere was also mapped.

The primary mission concluded on December 7, 1997, but the Galileo orbiter commenced an extended mission known as the Galileo Europa Mission (GEM), which ran until December 31, 1999. By the time GEM ended, most of the spacecraft was operating well beyond its original design specifications, having absorbed three times the radiation exposure that it had been built to withstand. Many of the instruments were no longer operating at peak performance, but were still functional, so a second extension, the Galileo Millennium Mission (GMM) was authorized. On September 20, 2003, after 14 years in space and 8 years in the Jovian system, Galileo's mission was terminated by sending the orbiter into Jupiter's atmosphere at a speed of over 48 kilometers per second (30 mi/s) to eliminate the possibility of contaminating the moons with bacteria.

== Background ==
Jupiter is the largest planet in the Solar System, with more than twice the mass of all the other planets combined. Consideration of sending a probe to Jupiter began as early as 1959, when the National Aeronautics and Space Administration (NASA) Jet Propulsion Laboratory (JPL) developed four mission concepts:

- Deep space flights would fly through interplanetary space;
- Planetary flyby missions would fly past planets close enough to collect scientific data and could visit multiple planets on a single mission;
- Orbiter missions would place a spacecraft in orbit around a planet for prolonged and detailed study;
- Atmospheric entry and lander missions would explore a planet's atmosphere and surface.

Two missions to Jupiter, Pioneer 10 and Pioneer 11, were approved in 1969, with NASA's Ames Research Center given responsibility for planning the missions. Pioneer 10 was launched in March 1972 and passed within 200,000 kilometers (120,000 mi) of Jupiter in December 1973. It was followed by Pioneer 11, which was launched in April 1973, and passed within 34,000 kilometers (21,000 mi) of Jupiter in December 1974, before heading on to an encounter with Saturn. They were followed by the more advanced Voyager 1 and Voyager 2 spacecraft, which were launched on 5 September and 20 August 1977 respectively, and reached Jupiter in March and July 1979. (Note: Although Voyager 2 was launched before Voyager 1, the latter reached Jupiter and Saturn first.)

== Planning ==
Galileo Project managers
Manager	Date
John R. Casani	October 1977 – February 1988
Dick Spehalski	February 1988 – March 1990
Bill O'Neil	March 1990 – December 1997
Bob Mitchell	December 1997 – June 1998
Jim Erickson	June 1998 – January 2001
Eilene Theilig	January 2001 – August 2003
Claudia Alexander	August 2003 – September 2003

=== Initiation ===
Following the approval of the Voyager missions, NASA's Scientific Advisory Group for Outer Solar System Missions considered the requirements for Jupiter orbiters and atmospheric probes. It noted that the technology to build a heat shield for an atmospheric probe did not yet exist, and indeed facilities to test one under the conditions found on Jupiter would not be available until 1980. There was also concern about the effects of radiation on spacecraft components, which would be better understood after Pioneer 10 and Pioneer 11 had conducted their flybys. Pioneer 10's flyby in December 1973 indicated that the effects were not as severe as had been feared. NASA management designated JPL as the lead center for the Jupiter Orbiter Probe (JOP) Project. John R. Casani, who had headed the Mariner and Voyager projects, became the first project manager. The JOP would be the fifth spacecraft to visit Jupiter, but the first to orbit it, and the probe the first to enter its atmosphere.

Ames and JPL decided to use a Mariner spacecraft for the Jupiter orbiter like the ones used for Voyager rather than a Pioneer spacecraft. Pioneer was stabilized by spinning the spacecraft at 60 rpm, which gave a 360-degree view of the surroundings, and did not require an attitude control system. By contrast, Mariner had an attitude control system with three gyroscopes and two sets of six nitrogen jet thrusters. Attitude was determined with reference to the Sun and Canopus, which were monitored with two primary and four secondary star tracker sensors. There was also an inertial reference unit and an accelerometer. The attitude control system allowed the spacecraft to take high-resolution images, but the functionality came at the cost of increased weight: a Mariner weighed 722 kilograms (1,592 lb) compared to just 146 kilograms (322 lb) for a Pioneer.

The increase in weight had implications. The Voyager spacecraft had been launched by Titan IIIE rockets with a Centaur upper stage, but Titan was retired afterwards. In the late 1970s, NASA was focused on the development of the reusable Space Shuttle, which was expected to make expendable rockets obsolete. In late 1975, NASA decreed that all future planetary missions would be launched by the Space Shuttle. The JOP would be the first to do so. The Space Shuttle was supposed to have the services of a space tug to launch payloads requiring something more than a low Earth orbit, but this was never approved. The United States Air Force (USAF) instead developed the solid-fueled Interim Upper Stage (IUS), later renamed the Inertial Upper Stage (with the same acronym), for the purpose.

The IUS was constructed in a modular fashion, with two stages, a large one with 9,700 kilograms (21,400 lb) of propellant, and a smaller one with 2,700 kilograms (6,000 lb). This was sufficient for most satellites. It could also be configured with two large stages to launch multiple satellites. A configuration with three stages, two large and one small, would be enough for a planetary mission, so NASA contracted with Boeing for the development of a three-stage IUS. A two-stage IUS was not powerful enough to launch a payload to Jupiter without resorting to using a series of gravity-assist maneuvers around planets to garner additional speed. Most engineers regarded this solution as inelegant and planetary scientists at JPL disliked it because it meant that the mission would take months or even years longer to reach Jupiter. Longer travel times meant that the spacecraft's components would age and possibly fail, and the onboard power supply and propellant would be depleted. Some of the gravity assist options also involved flying closer to the Sun, which would induce thermal stresses that also might cause failures.

It was estimated that the JOP would cost $634 million (equivalent to $2.265 billion in 2025), and it had to compete for fiscal year 1978 funding with the Space Shuttle and the Hubble Space Telescope. A successful lobbying campaign secured funding for both JOP and Hubble over the objections of Senator William Proxmire, the chairman of the Independent Agencies Appropriations Subcommittee. The United States Congress approved funding for the Jupiter Orbiter Probe on July 19, 1977, and JOP officially commenced on October 1, 1977, the start of the fiscal year. Project manager Casani solicited suggestions for a more inspirational name for the project from people associated with it. The most votes went to "Galileo", after Galileo Galilei, the first person to view Jupiter through a telescope, and the discoverer of what are now known as the Galilean moons in 1610. It was noted at the time that the name was also that of a spacecraft in the Star Trek television show. In February 1978, Casani officially announced the choice of the name "Galileo".

=== Preparation ===
To enhance reliability and reduce costs, the project engineers decided to switch from a pressurized atmospheric probe to a vented one, so the pressure inside the probe would be the same as that outside, thus extending its lifetime in Jupiter's atmosphere, but this added 100 kilograms (220 lb) to its weight. Another 165 kilograms (364 lb) was added in structural changes to improve reliability. This required additional fuel in the IUS, but the three-stage IUS was itself overweight with respect to its design specifications, by about 3,200 kilograms (7,000 lb). Lifting Galileo and the three-stage IUS required a special lightweight version of the Space Shuttle external tank, the Space Shuttle orbiter stripped of all non-essential equipment, and the Space Shuttle main engines (SSME) running at full power level—109 percent of their rated power level. (Note: The rated power level (RPL) is the power at which an engine can be normally operated. In the case of the Space Shuttle, the specification called for 27,000 seconds operation at 100 percent of the RPL, or 14,000 seconds at 109 percent of the RPL, which was designated full power level (FPL).) Running at this power level necessitated the development of a more elaborate engine cooling system. Concerns were raised over whether the engines could be run at 109 percent by the launch date, so a gravity-assist maneuver using Mars was substituted for a direct flight.

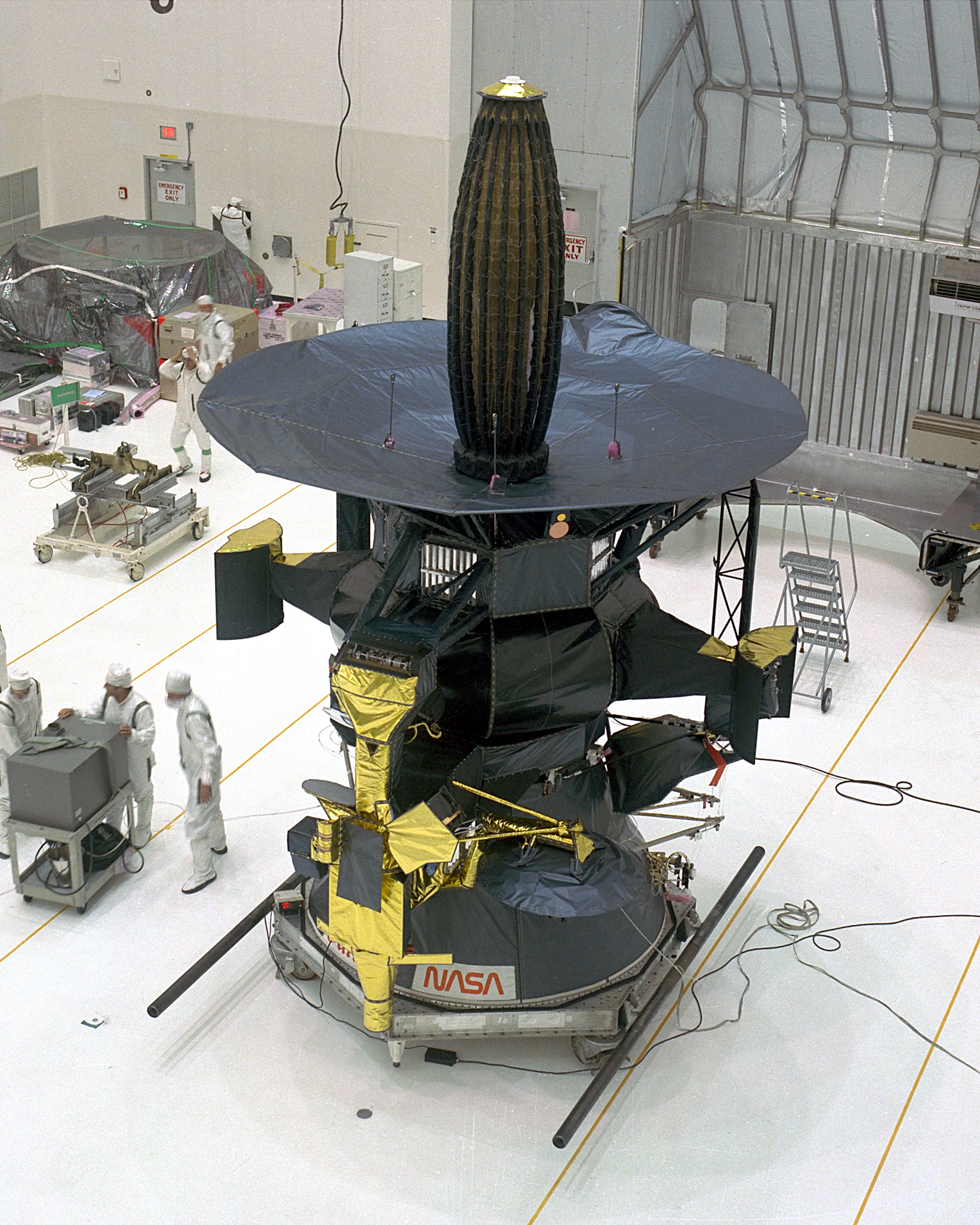
In the Vertical Processing Facility (VPF), Galileo is prepared for mating with the Inertial Upper Stage booster.

Plans called for the Space Shuttle Columbia to launch Galileo on the STS-23 mission, tentatively scheduled for sometime between January 2 and 12, 1982, this being the launch window when Earth, Mars and Jupiter were aligned to permit Mars to be used for the gravity-assist maneuver. By 1980, delays in the Space Shuttle program pushed the launch date for Galileo back to 1984. While a Mars slingshot was still possible in 1984, it would no longer be sufficient.

NASA decided to launch Galileo on two separate missions, launching the orbiter in February 1984 with the probe following a month later. The orbiter would be in orbit around Jupiter when the probe arrived, allowing the orbiter to perform its role as a relay. This configuration required a second Space Shuttle mission and a second carrier spacecraft to be built for the probe to take it to Jupiter, and was estimated to cost an additional $50 million (equivalent to $179 million in 2025), but NASA hoped to be able to recoup some of this through competitive bidding. The problem was that while the atmospheric probe was light enough to launch with the two-stage IUS, the Jupiter orbiter was too heavy to do so, even with a gravity assist from Mars, so the three-stage IUS was still required.

By late 1980, the price tag for the IUS had risen to $506 million (equivalent to $1.808 billion in 2025). The USAF could absorb this cost overrun on the development of the two-stage IUS (and indeed anticipated that it might cost far more), but NASA was faced with a quote of $179 million (equivalent to $640 million in 2025) for the development of the three-stage version, which was $100 million (equivalent to $357 million in 2025) more than it had budgeted for. At a press conference on January 15, 1981, Robert A. Frosch, the NASA Administrator, announced that NASA was withdrawing support for the three-stage IUS, and going with a Centaur G Prime upper stage because "no other alternative upper stage is available on a reasonable schedule or with comparable costs."

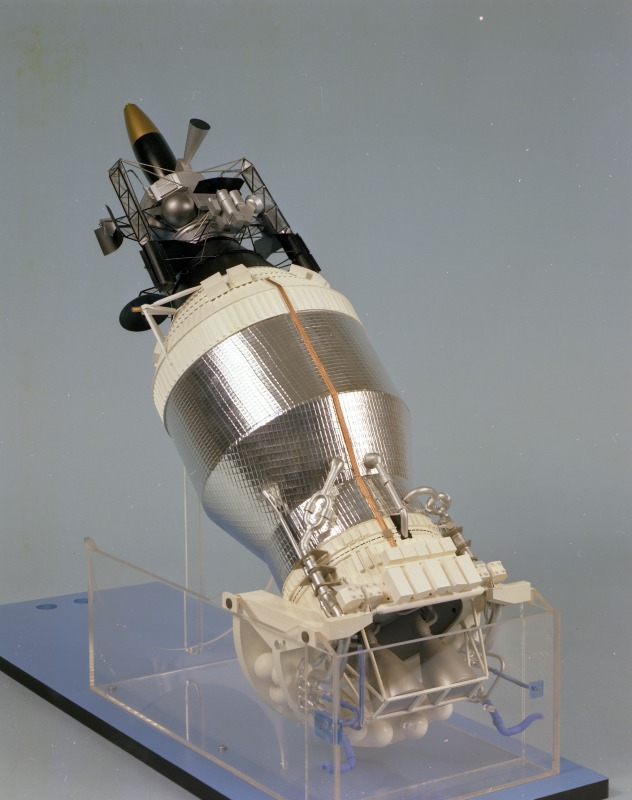
Model of Galileo atop a Centaur G Prime upper stage in the San Diego Air and Space Museum

Centaur provided many advantages over the IUS. The main one was that it was far more powerful. The probe and orbiter could be recombined, and the probe could be delivered directly to Jupiter in two years' flight time. The second was that, despite this, it was gentler than the IUS, because it had lower thrust. This reduced the chance of damage to the payload. Thirdly, unlike solid-fuel rockets which burned to completion once ignited, a Centaur could be switched off and on again. This gave it flexibility, which increased the chances of a successful mission, and permitted options like asteroid flybys. Centaur was proven and reliable, whereas the IUS had not yet flown. The only concern was about safety; solid-fuel rockets were considered safer than liquid-fuel ones, especially ones containing liquid hydrogen. NASA engineers estimated that additional safety features might take up to five years to develop and cost up to $100 million (equivalent to $357 million in 2025).

In February 1981, JPL learned that the Office of Management and Budget (OMB) was planning major cuts to NASA's budget, and was considering cancelling Galileo. The USAF intervened to save Galileo from cancellation. JPL had considerable experience with autonomous spacecraft that could make their own decisions. This was a necessity for deep space probes, since a signal from Earth takes from 35 to 52 minutes to reach Jupiter, depending on the relative position of the planets in their orbits. The USAF was interested in providing this capability for its satellites, so that they would be able to determine their attitude using onboard systems rather than relying on ground stations, which were not "hardened" against nuclear weapons, and could take independent evasive action against anti-satellite weapons. It was also interested in the manner in which JPL was designing Galileo to withstand the intense radiation of the magnetosphere of Jupiter, as this could be used to harden satellites against the electromagnetic pulse of nuclear explosions. On February 6, 1981 Strom Thurmond, the President pro tem of the Senate, wrote directly to David Stockman, the director of the OMB, arguing that Galileo was vital to the nation's defense. (Note: Sandia National Laboratories produced 12,000 microprocessor and integrated circuit components for Galileo that were hardened against radiation.)

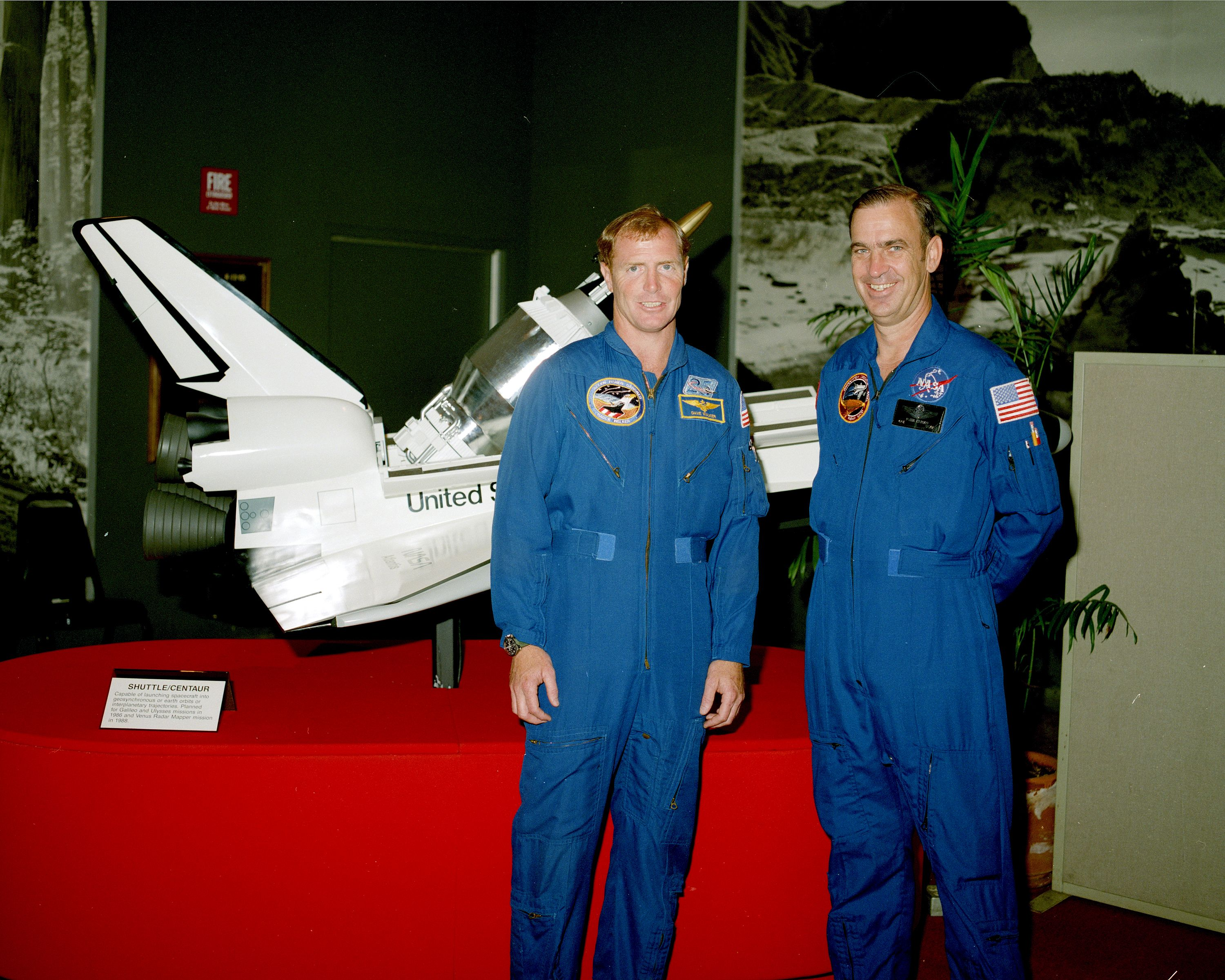
Astronauts John M. Fabian and David M. Walker pose in front of a model of the Shuttle-Centaur with Galileo in mid-1985

In December 1984, Casani proposed adding a flyby of asteroid 29 Amphitrite to the Galileo mission. In plotting a course to Jupiter, the engineers wanted to avoid asteroids. Little was known about them at the time, and it was suspected that they could be surrounded by dust particles. Flying through a dust cloud could damage the spacecraft's optics and possibly other parts of the spacecraft as well. To be safe, JPL wanted to avoid asteroids by at least 10,000 kilometers (6,200 mi). Most of the asteroids in the vicinity of the flight path like 1219 Britta and 1972 Yi Xing were only a few kilometers in diameter and promised little scientific value when observed from a safe distance, but 29 Amphitrite was one of the largest, and a flyby at even 10,000 kilometers (6,200 mi) could have great value. The flyby would delay the spacecraft's arrival in Jupiter orbit from August 29 to December 10, 1988, and the expenditure of propellant would reduce the number of orbits of Jupiter from eleven to ten. This was expected to add $20 to $25 million (equivalent to $52 to $65 million in 2025) to the cost of the Galileo project. The 29 Amphitrite flyby was approved by NASA Administrator James M. Beggs on December 6, 1984.

During testing, contamination was discovered in the system of metal slip rings and brushes used to transmit electrical signals around the spacecraft, and they were returned to be refabricated. The problem was traced back to a chlorofluorocarbon used to clean parts after soldering. It had been absorbed, and was then released in a vacuum environment. It mixed with debris generated as the brushes wore down, and caused intermittent problems with electrical signal transmission. Problems were also detected in the performance of memory devices in an electromagnetic radiation environment. The components were replaced, but then a read disturb problem arose, in which reads from one memory location disturbed the contents of adjacent locations. This was found to have been caused by the changes made to make the components less sensitive to electromagnetic radiation. Each component had to be removed, retested, and replaced. All of the spacecraft components and spare parts received a minimum of 2,000 hours of testing. The spacecraft was expected to last for at least five years—long enough to reach Jupiter and perform its mission. On December 19, 1985, it departed JPL in Pasadena, California, on the first leg of its journey, a road trip to the Kennedy Space Center in Florida. The Galileo mission was scheduled for STS-61-G on May 20, 1986, using Space Shuttle Atlantis.

=== Spacecraft ===
JPL built the Galileo spacecraft and managed the Galileo program for NASA, but West Germany's Messerschmitt-Bölkow-Blohm supplied the propulsion module, and Ames managed the atmospheric probe, which was built by the Hughes Aircraft Company. At launch, the orbiter and probe together had a mass of 2,562 kg (5,648 lb) and stood 6.15 m (20.2 ft) tall. There were twelve experiments on the orbiter and seven on the atmospheric probe. The orbiter was powered by a pair of general-purpose heat source radioisotope thermoelectric generators (GPHS-RTGs) fueled by plutonium-238 that generated 570 watts at launch. The atmospheric probe had a lithium–sulfur battery rated at 730 watt-hours. (Note: A 12-Volt car battery has about 600 Watt-Hours.)

Probe instruments included sensors for measuring atmospheric temperature and pressure. There was a mass spectrometer and a helium-abundance detector to study atmospheric composition, and a whistler detector for measurements of lightning activity and Jupiter's radiation belt. There were magnetometer sensors, a plasma-wave detector, a high-energy particle detector, a cosmic and Jovian dust detector, and a heavy ion counter. There was a near-infrared mapping spectrometer for multispectral images for atmospheric and moon surface chemical analysis, and an ultraviolet spectrometer to study gases.

=== Reconsideration ===
On January 28, 1986, Space Shuttle Challenger lifted off on the STS-51-L mission. A failure of the solid rocket booster 73 seconds into flight tore the spacecraft apart, resulting in the deaths of all seven crew members. The Space Shuttle Challenger disaster was America's worst space disaster up to that time. The immediate impact on the Galileo project was that the May launch date could not be met because the Space Shuttles were grounded while the cause of the disaster was investigated. When they did fly again, Galileo would have to compete with high-priority Department of Defense launches, the tracking and data relay satellite system, and the Hubble Space Telescope. By April 1986, it was expected that the Space Shuttles would not fly again before July 1987 at the earliest, and Galileo could not be launched before December 1987.

Animation of Galileo's trajectory from October 19, 1989, to September 30, 2003 Galileo · Jupiter · Earth · Venus · 951 Gaspra · 243 Ida

The Rogers Commission into the Challenger disaster handed down its report on June 6, 1986. It was critical of NASA's safety protocols and risk management. In particular, it noted the hazards of a Centaur-G stage. On June 19, 1986, NASA Administrator James C. Fletcher canceled the Shuttle-Centaur project. This was only partly due to the NASA management's increased aversion to risk in the wake of the Challenger disaster; NASA management also considered the money and manpower required to get the Space Shuttle flying again, and decided that there were insufficient resources to resolve lingering issues with Shuttle-Centaur as well. The changes to the Space Shuttle proved more extensive than anticipated, and in April 1987, JPL was informed that Galileo could not be launched before October 1989. The Galileo spacecraft was shipped back to JPL.

Without Centaur, it looked like there was no means of getting Galileo to Jupiter. For a time, Los Angeles Times science reporter Usha Lee McFarling noted, "it looked like Galileo's only trip would be to the Smithsonian Institution." The cost of keeping it ready to fly in space was reckoned at $40 to $50 million per year (equivalent to $100 to $124 million in 2025), and the estimated cost of the whole project had blown out to $1.4 billion (equivalent to $3 billion in 2025).

At JPL, the Galileo Mission Design Manager and Navigation Team Chief, Robert Mitchell, assembled a team that consisted of Dennis Byrnes, Louis D'Amario, Roger Diehl and himself, to see if they could find a trajectory that would get Galileo to Jupiter using only a two-stage IUS. Roger Diehl came up with the idea of using a series of gravity assists to provide the additional velocity required to reach Jupiter. This would require Galileo to fly past Venus, and then past Earth twice. This was referred to as the Venus-Earth-Earth Gravity Assist (VEEGA) trajectory.

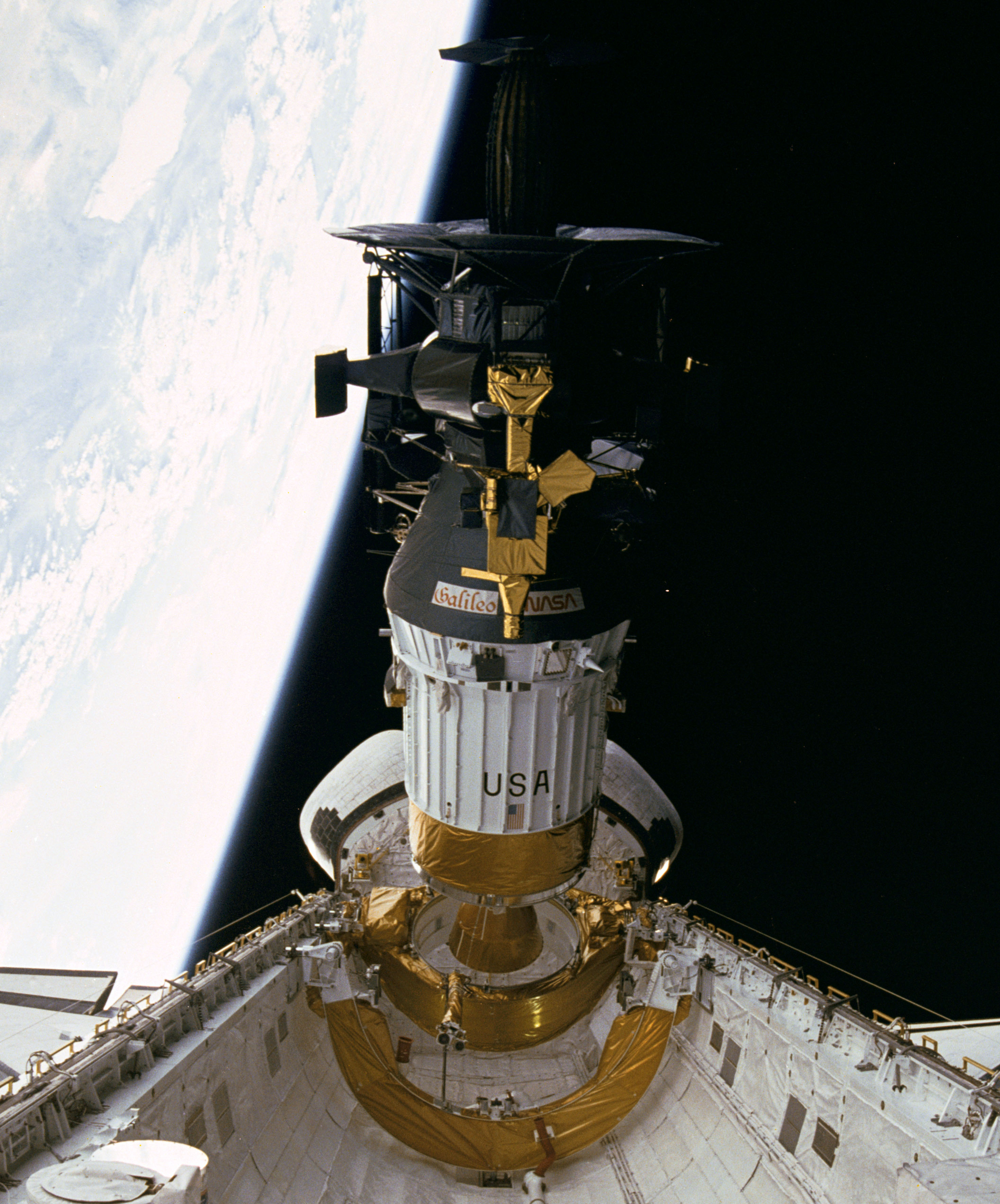
Galileo is prepared for release from Space Shuttle Atlantis. The Inertial Upper Stage (white) is attached.

The reason no one had considered the VEEGA trajectory before was that the second encounter with Earth would not give the spacecraft any extra energy. Diehl realised that this was not necessary; the second encounter would merely change its direction to put it on a course for Jupiter. In addition to increasing the flight time, the VEEGA trajectory had another drawback from the point of view of NASA Deep Space Network (DSN): Galileo would arrive at Jupiter when it was at the maximum range from Earth, and maximum range meant minimum signal strength. It would have a declination of 23 degrees south instead of 18 degrees north, so the tracking station would be the Canberra Deep Space Communication Complex in Australia, with its two 34-meter and one 70-meter antennae. A northerly declination could have been supported by two sites, at Goldstone and Madrid. The Canberra antennae were supplemented by the 64-meter antenna at the Parkes Observatory.

Initially it was thought that the VEEGA trajectory demanded a November launch, but D'Amario and Byrnes calculated that a mid-course correction between Venus and Earth would permit an October launch as well. Taking such a roundabout route meant that Galileo would require sixty months to reach Jupiter instead of just thirty, but it would get there. Consideration was given to using the USAF's Titan IV launch system with its Centaur G Prime upper stage. This was retained as a backup for a time, but in November 1988 the USAF informed NASA that it could not provide a Titan IV in time for the May 1991 launch opportunity, owing to the backlog of high priority Department of Defense missions. However, the USAF supplied IUS-19, which had originally been earmarked for a Department of Defense mission, for use by the Galileo mission.

=== Nuclear concerns ===
As the launch date of Galileo neared, anti-nuclear groups, concerned over what they perceived as an unacceptable risk to the public's safety from the plutonium in Galileo's GPHS-RTG modules, sought a court injunction prohibiting Galileo's launch. RTGs were necessary for deep space probes because they had to fly distances from the Sun that made the use of solar energy impractical. They had been used for years in planetary exploration without mishap: the Department of Defense's Lincoln Experimental Satellites 8/9 had 7 percent more plutonium on board than Galileo, and the two Voyager spacecraft each carried 80 percent of Galileo's load of plutonium. By 1989, plutonium had been used in 22 spacecraft.

Activists remembered the crash of the Soviet Union's nuclear-powered Kosmos 954 satellite in Canada in 1978, and the Challenger disaster, while it did not involve nuclear fuel, raised public awareness about spacecraft failures. No RTGs had ever done a non-orbital swing past the Earth at close range and high speed, as Galileo's VEEGA trajectory required it to do. This created the possibility of a mission failure in which Galileo struck Earth's atmosphere and dispersed plutonium. Planetary scientist Carl Sagan, a strong supporter of the Galileo mission, wrote that "there is nothing absurd about either side of this argument."

Before the Challenger disaster, JPL had conducted shock tests on the RTGs that indicated that they could withstand a pressure of 14,000 kilopascals (2,000 psi) without a failure, which would have been sufficient to withstand an explosion on the launch pad. The possibility of adding additional shielding was considered but rejected, mainly because it would add an unacceptable amount of extra weight. After the Challenger disaster, NASA commissioned a study on the possible effects if such an event occurred with Galileo on board. Angus McRonald, a JPL engineer, concluded that what would happen would depend on the altitude at which the Space Shuttle broke up. If the Galileo/IUS combination fell free from the orbiter at 27,000 meters (90,000 ft), the RTGs would fall to Earth without melting, and drop into the Atlantic Ocean about 240 kilometers (150 mi) from the Florida coast. On the other hand, if the orbiter broke up at an altitude of 98,700 meters (323,800 ft) it would be traveling at 2,425 meters per second (7,957 ft/s) and the RTG cases and GPHS modules would melt before falling into the Atlantic 640 kilometers (400 mi) off the Florida coast.

NASA concluded that the chance of a disaster was 1 in 2,500, although anti-nuclear groups thought it might be as high as 1 in 430. NASA assessed the risk to an individual at 1 in 100 million, about two orders of magnitude less than the danger of being killed by lightning. The prospect of an inadvertent re-entry into the atmosphere during the VEEGA maneuvers was reckoned at less than 1 in 2 million, but an accident might have released a maximum of 11,568 curies (428,000 GBq). This could result in up to 9 fatalities from cancer per 10 million exposed people.

== Launch ==
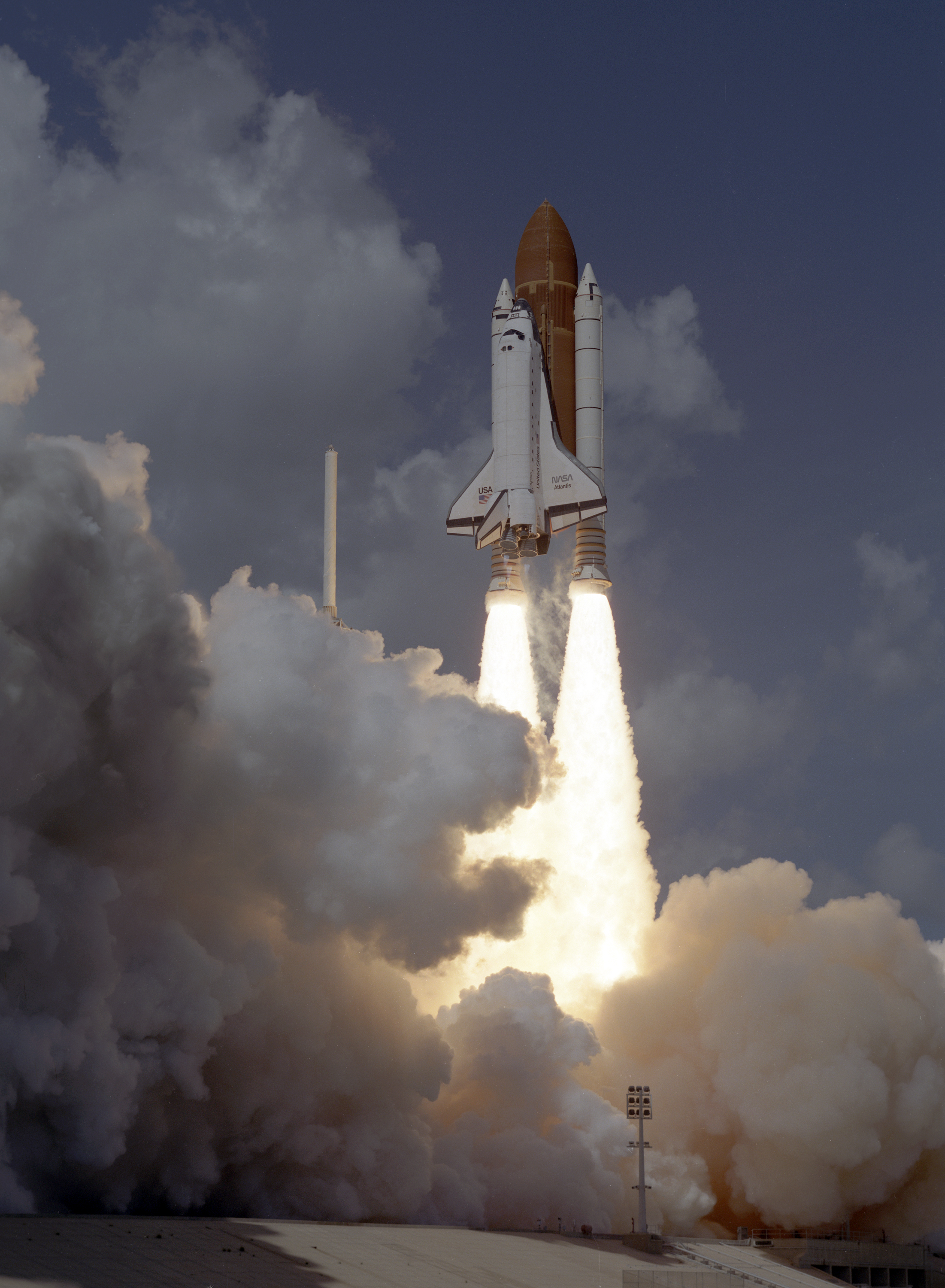
Launch of STS-34 with Galileo on board

STS-34 was the mission designated to launch Galileo, scheduled for October 12, 1989, in the Space Shuttle Atlantis. The spacecraft was delivered to the Kennedy Space Center by a high-speed truck convoy that departed JPL in the middle of the night. There were fears that the trucks might be hijacked by anti-nuclear activists or terrorists after the plutonium, so the route was kept secret from the drivers beforehand, and they drove through the night and the following day and only stopped for food and fuel.

Last-minute efforts by three environmental groups (the Christic Institute, the Florida Coalition for Peace and Justice and the Foundation on Economic Trends) to halt the launch were rejected by the District of Columbia Circuit on technical grounds rather than the merits of the case, but in a concurring opinion, Chief Justice Patricia Wald wrote that while the legal challenge was not frivolous, there was no evidence of the plaintiffs' claim that NASA had acted improperly in compiling the mission's environmental assessment. On October 16, eight protesters were arrested for trespassing at the Kennedy Space Center; three were jailed and the remaining five released. Federal judge Oliver Gasch ruled on October 21 that the launch was in the public interest, as canceling it would cost the public $164 million and increased knowledge of the Solar system.

The launch was twice delayed; first by a faulty main engine controller that forced a postponement to October 17, and then by inclement weather, which necessitated a postponement to the following day, but this was not a concern since the launch window extended until November 21. Atlantis finally lifted off at 16:53:40 UTC on October 18, and went into a 343-kilometer (213 mi) orbit. Galileo was successfully deployed at 00:15 UTC on October 19. Following the IUS burn, the Galileo spacecraft adopted its configuration for solo flight, and separated from the IUS at 01:06:53 UTC on October 19. The launch was perfect, and Galileo was soon headed towards Venus at over 14,000 km/h (9,000 mph). Atlantis returned to Earth safely on October 23.

== Venus encounter ==
The encounter with Venus on February 9 was in view of the DSN's Canberra and Madrid Deep Space Communications Complexes. Galileo's closest approach to Venus came at 05:58:48 UTC on February 10, 1990, at a range of 16,106 km (10,008 mi). Due to the Doppler effect, the spacecraft's velocity relative to Earth could be computed by measuring the change in carrier frequency of the spacecraft's transmission compared to the nominal frequency. Doppler data collected by the DSN allowed JPL to verify that the gravity-assist maneuver had been successful, and the spacecraft had obtained the expected 2.2 km/s (1.4 mi/s) increase in speed. Unfortunately, three hours into the flyby, the tracking station at Goldstone had to be shut down due to high winds, and Doppler data was lost.

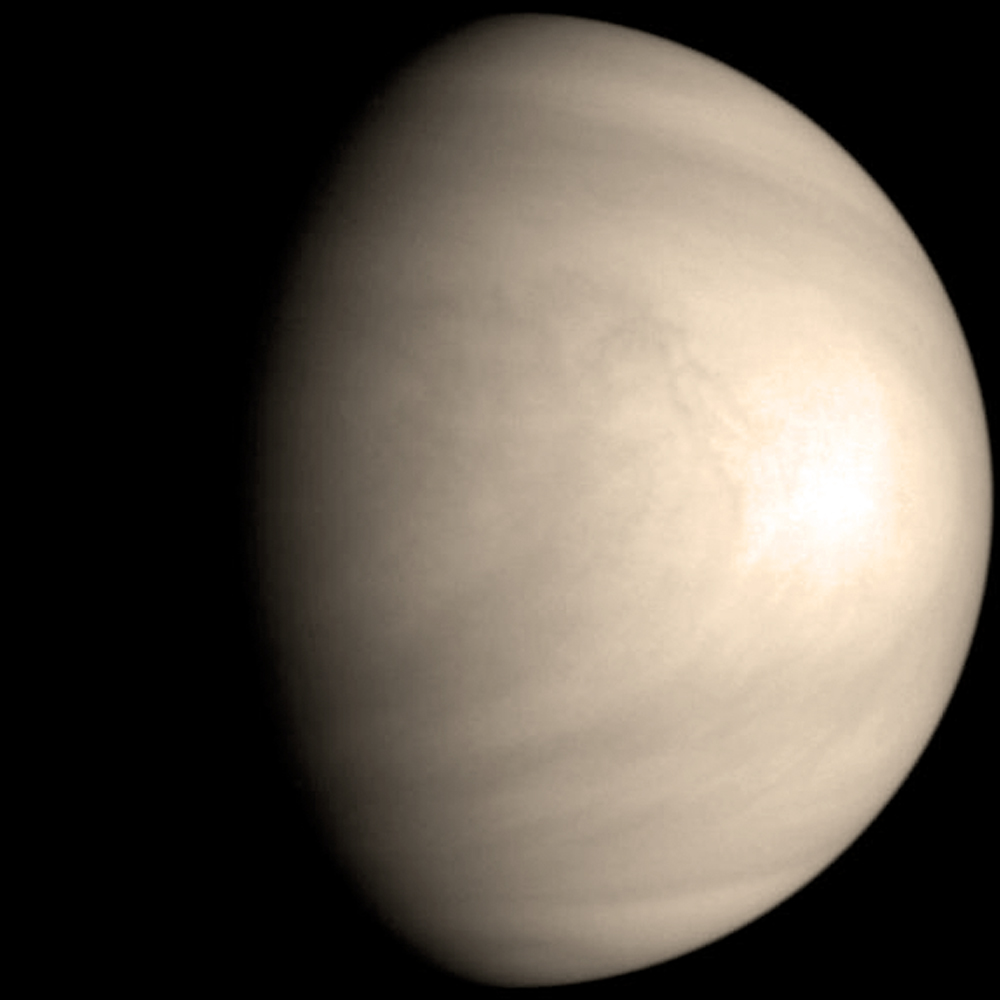
Violet light image of Venus taken in February 1990 by Galileo's solid state imaging (SSI) system

Because Venus was much closer to the Sun than the spacecraft had been designed to operate, great care was taken to avoid thermal damage. In particular, the X-band high gain antenna (HGA) was not deployed, but was kept folded up like an umbrella and pointed away from the Sun to keep it shaded and cool. This meant that the two small S-band low-gain antennae (LGAs) had to be used instead. They had a maximum bandwidth of 1,200 bits per second (bit/s) compared to the 134,000 bit/s expected from the HGA. As the spacecraft moved further from Earth, reception necessitated the use of the DSN's 70-meter dishes, to the detriment of other users, who had lower priority than Galileo. Even so, the downlink telemetry rate fell to 40 bit/s within a few days of the Venus flyby, and by March it was down to just 10 bit/s.

Venus had been the focus of many automated flybys, probes, balloons and landers, most recently the 1989 Magellan spacecraft, and Galileo had not been designed with Venus in mind. Nonetheless, there were useful observations that it could make, as it carried some instruments that had never flown on spacecraft to Venus, such as the near-infrared mapping spectrometer (NIMS). Telescopic observations of Venus had revealed that there were certain parts of the infrared spectrum that the greenhouse gases in the Venusian atmosphere did not block, making them transparent on these wavelengths. This permitted the NIMS to both view the clouds and obtain maps of the equatorial- and mid-latitudes of the night side of Venus with three to six times the resolution of Earth-based telescopes. The ultraviolet spectrometer (UVS) was also deployed to observe the Venusian clouds and their motions.

Another set of observations was conducted using Galileo's energetic-particles detector (EPD) when Galileo moved through the bow shock caused by Venus's interaction with the solar wind. Earth's magnetic field causes the bow shock to occur at around 65,000 kilometers (40,000 mi) from its center, but Venus's weak magnetic field causes it to occur nearly on the surface, so the solar wind interacts with the atmosphere. A search for lightning on Venus was conducted using the plasma-wave detector, which noted nine bursts likely to have been caused by lightning, but efforts to capture an image of lightning with the solid-state imaging system (SSI) were unsuccessful.

== Earth encounters ==
=== Flybys ===
Galileo made two course corrections on April 9 to 12 and May 11 to 12, 1990, to alter its velocity by 35 meters per second (110 ft/s). The spacecraft flew by Earth twice; the first time at a range of 960 km (600 mi) at 20:34:34 UTC on December 8, 1990. This was 8 km (5 mi) higher than predicted, and the time of the closest approach was within a second of the prediction. It was the first time that a deep space probe had returned to Earth from interplanetary space. A second flyby of Earth was at 304 km (189 mi) at 15:09:25 UTC on December 8, 1992. This time the spacecraft passed within a kilometer of its aiming point over the South Atlantic. This was so accurate that a scheduled course correction was cancelled, thereby saving 5 kilograms (11 lb) of propellant.

=== Earth's bow shock and the solar wind ===
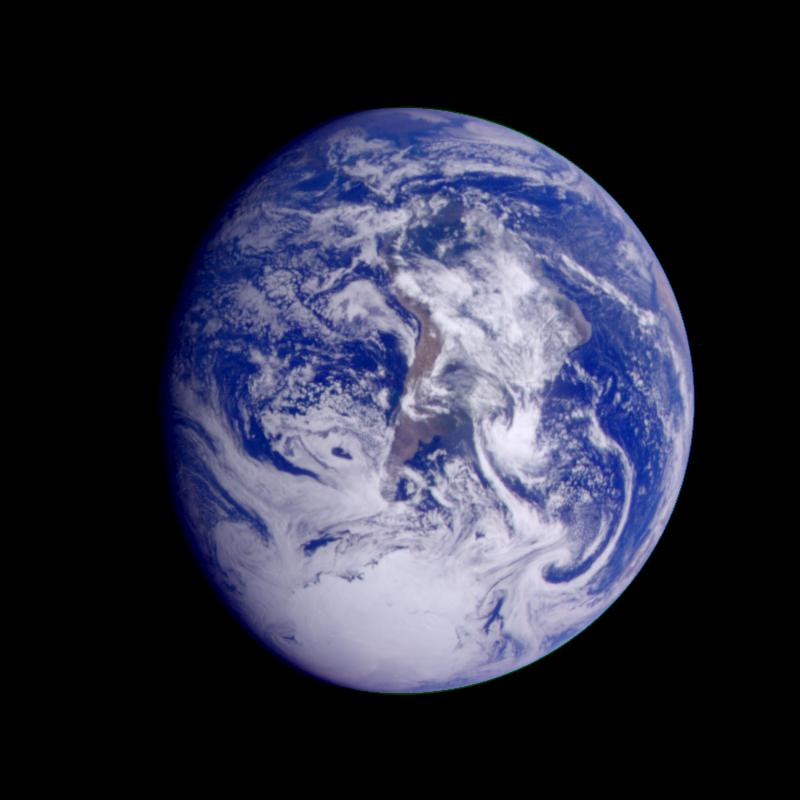
Galileo image of Earth, taken in December 1990

The Earth encounters provided an opportunity for a series of experiments. A study of Earth's bow shock was conducted as Galileo passed by Earth's day side. The solar wind travels at 200 to 800 kilometers per second (120 to 500 mi/s) and is deflected by Earth's magnetic field, creating a magnetic tail on Earth's dark side over a thousand times the radius of the planet. Observations were made by Galileo when it passed through the magnetic tail on Earth's dark side at a distance of 56,000 kilometers (35,000 mi) from the planet. The magnetosphere was quite active at the time, and Galileo detected magnetic storms and whistlers caused by lightning strikes.

The NIMS was employed to look for mesospheric clouds, which were thought to be caused by methane released by industrial processes. The water vapor in the clouds breaks down the ozone in the upper atmosphere. Normally the clouds are only seen in September or October, but Galileo was able to detect them in December, an indication of possible damage to Earth's ozone layer.

=== Remote detection of life on Earth ===
Carl Sagan, pondering the question of whether life on Earth could be easily detected from space, devised a set of experiments in the late 1980s using Galileo's remote sensing instruments during the mission's first Earth flyby in December 1990. After data acquisition and processing, Sagan published a paper in Nature in 1993 detailing the results of the experiment. Galileo had indeed found what are now referred to as the "Sagan criteria for life". These included strong absorption of light at the red end of the visible spectrum (especially over continents) by chlorophyll in photosynthesizing plants; absorption bands of molecular oxygen as a result of plant activity; infrared bands caused by the approximately 1 micromole per mole of methane (a gas which must be replenished by volcanic or biological activity) in the atmosphere; and modulated narrowband radio wave transmissions uncharacteristic of any known natural source. Galileo's experiments were thus the first scientific controls in the newborn science of astrobiological remote sensing.

=== Lunar observations ===
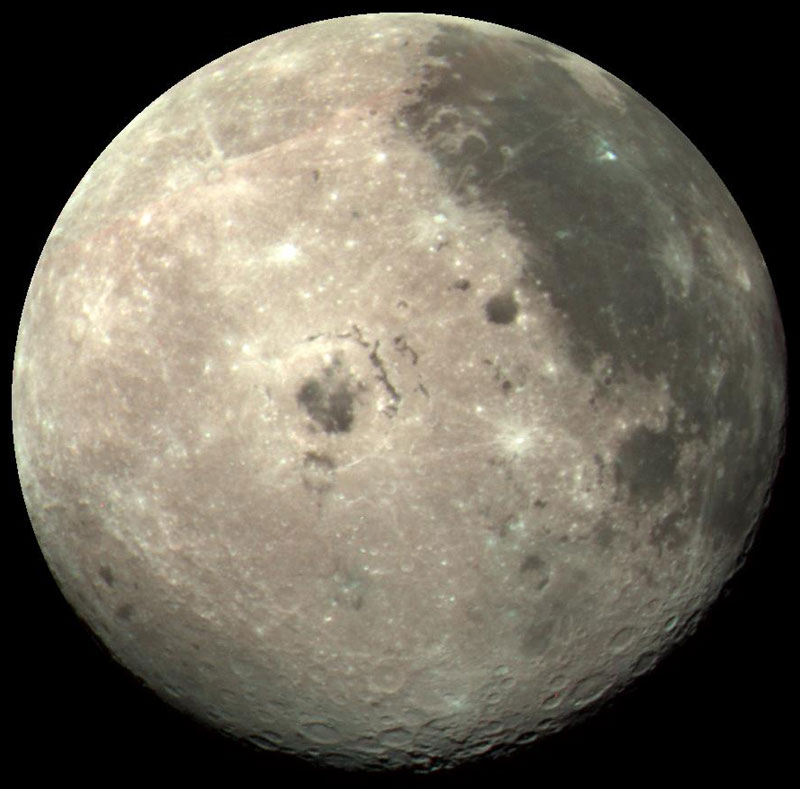
Mare Orientale on the Moon

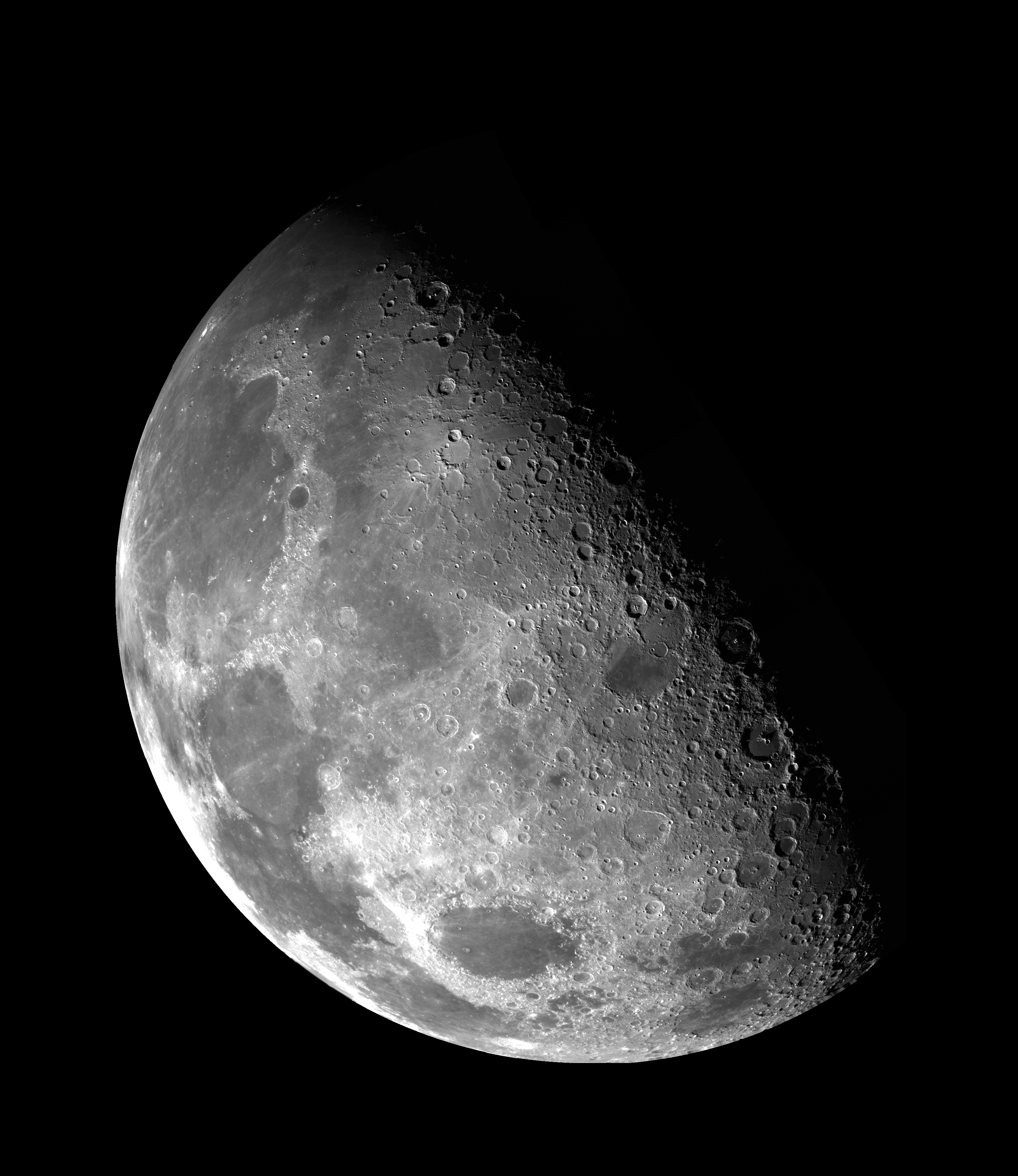
Galileo shot of the lunar north pole

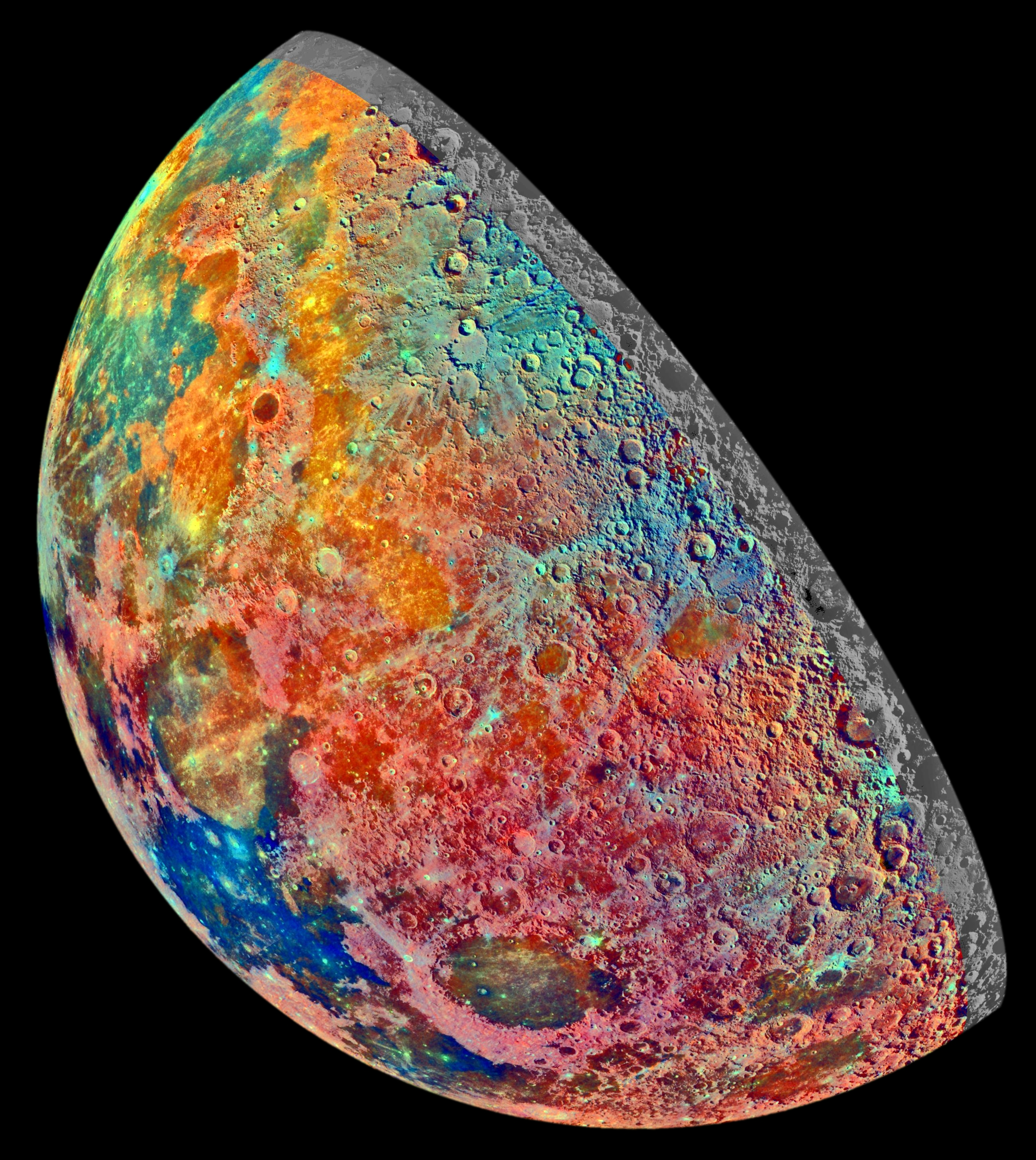
False-color mosaic by Galileo showing compositional variations of the Moon's surface

En route to Galileo's second gravity-assist flyby of Earth, the spacecraft flew over the lunar north pole on December 8, 1992, at an altitude of 110,000 kilometers (68,000 mi). The north pole had been photographed before, by Mariner 10 in 1973, but Galileo's cameras, with their 1.1 kilometers (0.68 mi) per pixel imagery, provided new information about a region that still held some scientific mysteries. The infrared spectromer surveyed the surface minerals and revealed that the region was more minerallogically diverse than expected. There was evidence that the Moon had been volcanically active earlier than originally thought, and the spectrometer clearly distinguished different lava flows on the Mare Serenitatis. Areas where titanium-rich material had been blasted from vents, like the one sampled by Apollo 17, showed up clearly.

=== Galileo Optical Experiment ===
During the second Earth flyby, another experiment was performed. Optical communications in space were assessed by detecting light pulses from powerful lasers with Galileo's CCD. The experiment, dubbed Galileo Optical Experiment or GOPEX, used two separate sites to beam laser pulses to the spacecraft, one at Table Mountain Observatory in California and the other at the Starfire Optical Range in New Mexico. The Table Mountain site used a Nd:YAG laser operating at a frequency-doubled wavelength of 532 nm, with a repetition rate of 15 to 30 Hertz and a pulse power full width at half maximum (FWHM) in the tens of megawatts range, which was coupled to a 0.6 m (2.0 ft) Cassegrain reflector telescope for transmission to Galileo. The Starfire range site used a similar setup with a larger 1.5 m (4.9 ft) transmitting telescope. Long-exposure (~0.1 to 0.8 s) images using Galileo's 560 nm centered green filter produced images of Earth clearly showing the laser pulses even at distances of up to 6 million km (3.7 million mi).

Adverse weather conditions, restrictions placed on laser transmissions by the U.S. Space Defense Operations Center (SPADOC) and a pointing error caused by the scan platform on the spacecraft not being able to change direction and speed as quickly as expected (which prevented laser detection on all frames with less than 400 ms exposure times) contributed to a reduction in the number of successful detections of the laser transmission to 48 of the total 159 frames taken. Nonetheless, the experiment was considered a resounding success and the data acquired were used to design laser downlinks to send large volumes of data very quickly from spacecraft to Earth. The scheme was studied in 2004 for a data link to a future Mars-orbiting spacecraft. On December 5, 2023, NASA's Deep Space Optical Communications experiment on the Psyche spacecraft used infrared lasers for two-way communication between Earth and the spacecraft.

== High-gain antenna problem ==
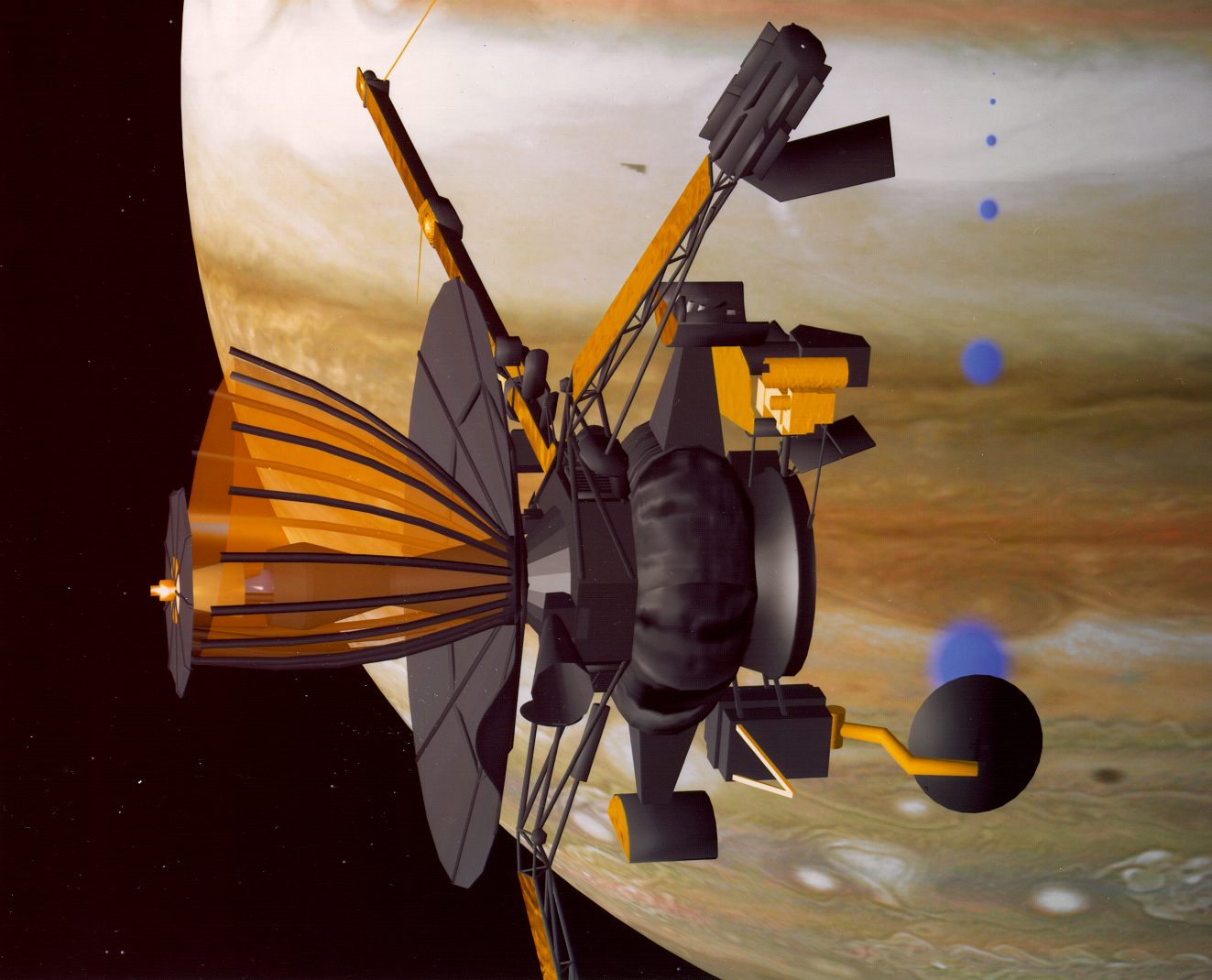
Illustration of Galileo with antenna not fully deployed

After the Venus flyby and Galileo passing beyond Earth’s orbit, it was no longer risky to employ the HGA, so on April 11, 1991, Galileo was ordered to unfurl it. This was done using two small dual drive actuator (DDA) motors to drive a worm gear, and was expected to take 165 seconds, or 330 seconds if one actuator failed. The antenna had 18 graphite-epoxy ribs; when the driver motor started and put pressure on the ribs, they were supposed to pop out of the cup their tips were held in, and the antenna would unfold like an umbrella. When it reached the fully deployed configuration, redundant microswitches would shut down the motors. Otherwise they would run for eight minutes before being automatically shut down to prevent them from overheating.

Through telemetry from Galileo, investigators determined that the electric motors had stalled at 56 seconds. The spacecraft's spin rate had decreased due to an increase in its moment of inertia and its wobble increased, indicative of an asymmetric unfolding. Only 15 ribs had popped out, leaving the antenna looking like a lop-sided, half-open umbrella. It was not possible to re-fold the antenna and try the opening sequence again; although the motors were capable of running in reverse, the antenna was not designed for this, and human assistance was required when it was done on Earth to ensure that the wire mesh did not snag.

The first thing the Galileo team tried was to rotate the spacecraft away from the Sun and back again on the assumption that the problem was with friction holding the pins in their sockets. If so, then heating and cooling the ribs might cause them to pop out of their sockets. This was done seven times, but with no result. They then tried swinging LGA-2 (which faced in the opposite direction to the HGA and LGA-1) 145 degrees to a hard stop, thereby shaking the spacecraft. This was done six times with no effect. Finally, they tried shaking the antenna by pulsing the DDA motors at 1.25 and 1.875 Hertz. This increased the torque by up to 40 percent. The motors were pulsed 13,000 times over a three-week period in December 1992 and January 1993, but only managed to move the ballscrew by one and a half revolutions beyond the stall point.

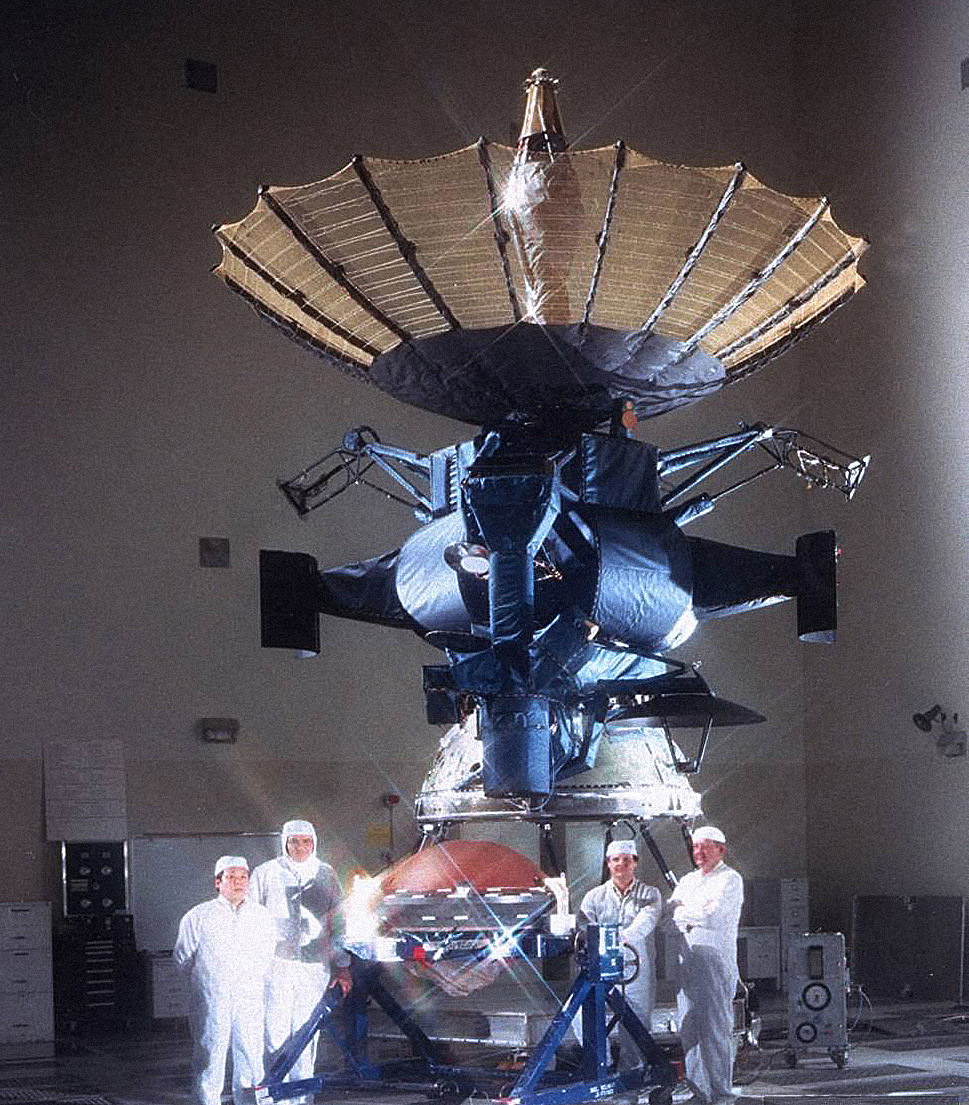
Galileo with its high gain antenna open in the VPF on Earth

Investigators concluded that during the 4.5 years that Galileo spent in storage after the Challenger disaster, the lubricants between the tips of the ribs and the cup were eroded. They were then worn down by vibration during the three cross-country journeys by truck between California and Florida for the spacecraft. The failed ribs were those closest to the flat-bed trailers carrying Galileo on these trips. The use of land transport was partly to save costs—air transport would have cost an additional $65,000 (equivalent to $147,000 in 2025) or so per trip—but also to reduce the amount of handling required in loading and unloading the aircraft, which was considered a major risk of damage. The spacecraft was also subjected to severe vibration in a vacuum environment by the IUS. Experiments on Earth with the test HGA showed that having a set of stuck ribs all on one side reduced the DDA torque produced by up to 40 percent.

The antenna lubricants were applied only once, nearly a decade before launch. Furthermore, the HGA was not subjected to the usual rigorous testing, because there was no backup unit that could be installed in Galileo in case of damage. The flight-ready HGA was never given a thermal evaluation test, and was unfurled only a half dozen or so times before the mission. Testing might not have revealed the problem in any case; the Lewis Research Center was never able to replicate the problem on Earth, and it was assumed to be the combination of loss of lubricant during transportation, vibration during launch by the IUS, and a prolonged period of time in the vacuum of space where bare metal touching could undergo cold welding. Whatever the cause, the HGA was rendered useless.

The two LGAs were capable of transmitting information back to Earth, but since it transmitted its signal over a cone with a 120-degree half-angle, allowing it to communicate even when not pointed at Earth, its bandwidth was significantly less than that of the HGA would have been, as the HGA transmitted over a half-angle of one-sixth of a degree. The HGA was to have transmitted at 134 kilobits per second, whereas LGA-1 was only intended to transmit at about 8 to 16 bits per second. LGA-1 transmitted with a power of about 15 to 20 watts, which by the time it reached Earth and had been collected by one of the large aperture 70-meter DSN antennas, had a total power of about 10^{‑20} watts. The change to mission plan required a series of software changes to be uploaded.

Image data collected was buffered and collected in Galileo's Command and Data Subsystem (CDS) memory. This represented 192 kilobytes of the 384 kilobyte CDS storage, and had been added late, out of concern that the 6504 Complementary metal–oxide–semiconductor (CMOS) memory devices might not be reliable during a VEEGA mission. As it happened, they gave no trouble, but the CDS memory could store up to 31 minutes of data from the Radio Relay Hardware (RRH) channels. To conserve bandwidth, data-compression software was implemented. Image compression used an integer approximation of the discrete cosine transform, while other data were compressed with variant of the Lempel–Ziv–Welch algorithm. Using compression, the arraying of several Deep Space Network antennas, and sensitivity upgrades to the receivers used to listen to Galileo's signal, data throughput was increased to a maximum of 160 bits per second. By further using data compression, the effective bandwidth could be raised to 1,000 bits per second.

The data collected on Jupiter and its moons were stored in the spacecraft's onboard tape recorder, and transmitted back to Earth during the long apoapsis portion of the probe's orbit using the low-gain antenna. At the same time, measurements were made of Jupiter's magnetosphere and transmitted back to Earth. The reduction in available bandwidth reduced the total amount of data transmitted throughout the mission, but William J. O'Neil, Galileo's project manager from 1992 to 1997, expressed confidence that 70 percent of Galileo's science goals could still be met. The decision to use magnetic tape for storage was a conservative one, taken in the late 1970s when the use of tape was common. Conservatism was not restricted to engineers; a 1980 suggestion that the results of Galileo could be distributed electronically instead of on paper was regarded as ridiculous by geologists, on the grounds that storage would be prohibitively expensive; some of them thought that taking measurements on a computer involved putting a wooden ruler up to the screen.

== Asteroid encounters ==
=== 951 Gaspra ===
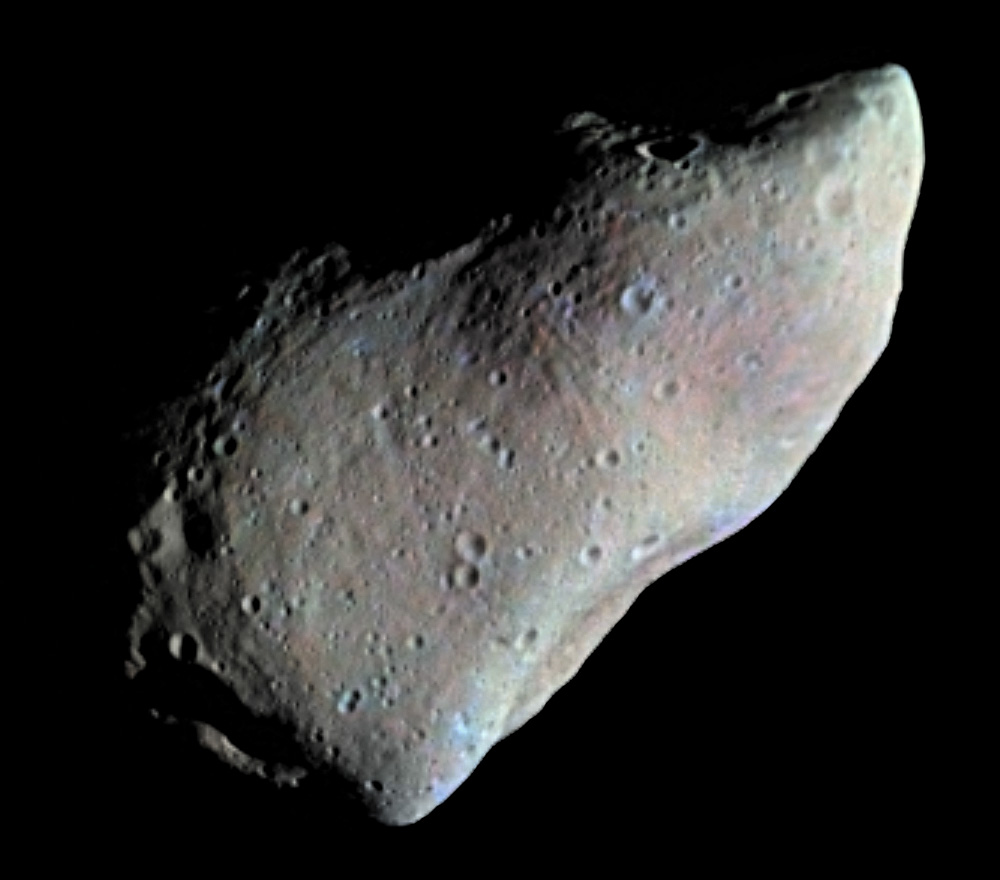
951 Gaspra (enhanced colorization)

Two months after entering the asteroid belt, Galileo performed the first asteroid encounter by a spacecraft. Galileo passed 951 Gaspra, an S-type asteroid, at a distance of 1,604 km (997 mi) at 22:37 UTC on October 29, 1991, at a relative speed of about 8 kilometers per second (5.0 mi/s). Fifty-seven images of Gaspra were taken with the SSI, covering about 80 percent of the asteroid. Without the HGA, the bit rate was only about 40 bit/s, so an image took up to 60 hours to transmit back to Earth. The Galileo project was able to secure 80 hours of Canberra's 70-meter dish time between 7 and 14 November 1991, but most of images taken, including low-resolution images of more of the surface, were not transmitted to Earth until November 1992.

The imagery revealed a cratered and irregular body, measuring about 19 by 12 by 11 kilometers (11.8 by 7.5 by 6.8 mi). Its shape was not remarkable for an asteroid of its size. Measurements were taken using the NIMS to indicate the asteroid's composition and physical properties. While Gaspra has plenty of small craters—over 600 of them ranging in size from 100 to 500 meters (330 to 1,640 ft)—it lacks large ones, hinting at a relatively recent origin, although it is possible that some of the depressions were eroded craters. Several relatively flat planar areas were found, suggesting that Gaspra was formed from another body by a collision. Measurements of the solar wind in the vicinity of the asteroid showed it changing direction a few hundred kilometers from Gaspra, which hinted that Gaspra might have a magnetic field, but this was not certain.

=== 243 Ida and Dactyl ===
Following the second Earth encounter, Galileo performed close observations of another asteroid, 243 Ida. A slight trajectory correction was made to enable this on August 26, 1993. With four hours to go before the encounter with Ida, Galileo spontaneously abandoned the observation configuration and resumed its cruise configuration. Engineers were able to correct the problem and have the instruments ready by 16:52:04 UTC on August 28, 1993, when Galileo flew past Ida at a range of 2,410 km (1,500 mi). High-resolution images were taken to create a color mosaic of one side of the asteroid, with the highest resolution image taken at a range of 10,500 mi (16,900 km). Measurements were taken using SSI and NIMS.

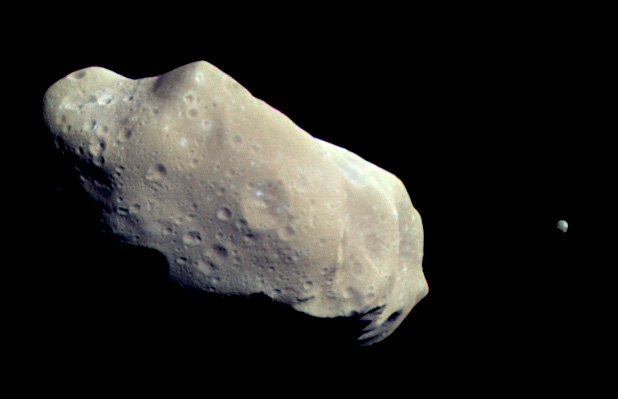
243 Ida, with its moon Dactyl to the right

Transmission was still limited to the 40 bit/s data rate available during the Gaspra flyby. At that rate, it took thirty hours to send each of the five frames. In September, the line of sight between Galileo and Earth was close to the Sun, so there was only time to send one mosaic before it was blocked by the Sun on September 29, 1993; the rest of the mosaics were transmitted in February and March, after Earth had come around the Sun. Galileo's tape recorder was used to store the images, but tape space was also required for the primary Jupiter mission. A technique was developed whereby only image fragments of two or three lines out of every 330 were initially sent. A determination could then be made as to whether the image was of 243 Ida or of empty space. Ultimately, only about 16 percent of the SSI data recorded could be sent back to Earth.

When astronomer Ann Harch examined the images on February 17, 1994, she found that Ida had a small moon measuring around 1.6 kilometers (1 mi) in diameter, which appeared in 47 images. A competition was held among Galileo project members to select a name for the moon, which was ultimately dubbed Dactyl after the legendary Dactyls, mythical beings which lived on Mount Ida, the geographical feature on Crete the asteroid was named for. Craters on Dactyl were named after individual dactyloi. Regions on 243 Ida were named after cities where Johann Palisa, the discover of 243 Ida, made his observations, while ridges on 243 Ida were named in honor of deceased Galileo team members.

Dactyl was the first asteroid moon to be discovered. Moons of asteroids had been assumed to be rare, but the discovery of Dactyl hinted that they might in fact be quite common. From subsequent analysis of this data, Dactyl appeared to be an S-type asteroid, and spectrally different from 243 Ida, although Ida is also an S-type asteroid. It was hypothesized that both may have been produced by the breakup of a Koronis parent body.

== Voyage to Jupiter ==
=== Comet Shoemaker–Levy 9 ===
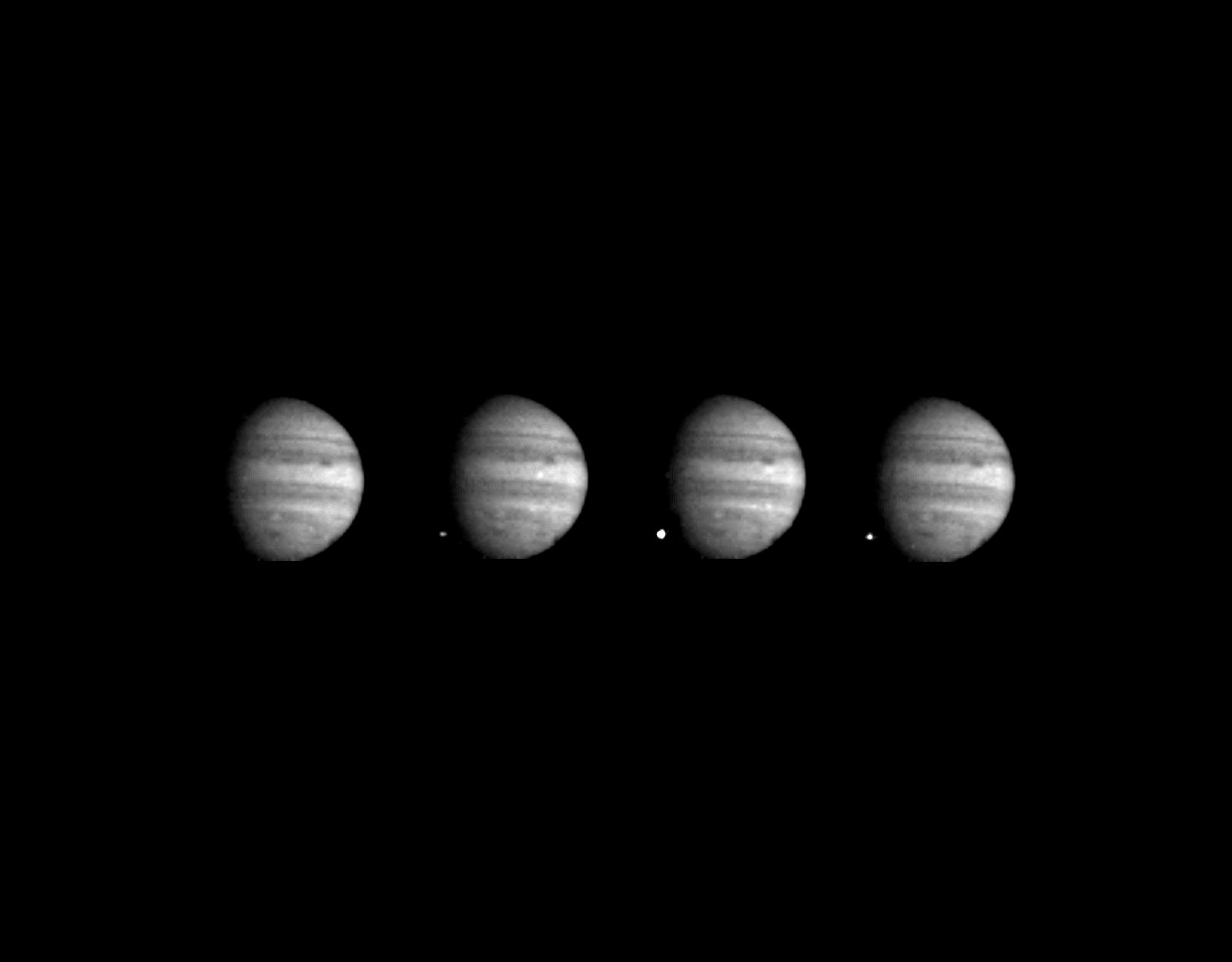
Four images of Jupiter and Comet Shoemaker–Levy 9 in visible light taken by Galileo at 2 1/3-second intervals from a distance of 238 million kilometers (148 million miles)

Galileo's prime mission was a two-year study of the Jovian system, but on March 26, 1993, while it was en route, astronomers Carolyn S. Shoemaker, Eugene M. Shoemaker and David H. Levy discovered fragments of a comet orbiting Jupiter, the remains of a comet that had passed within Jupiter's Roche limit and had been torn apart by tidal forces. It was named Comet Shoemaker–Levy 9. Calculations indicated that it would crash into the planet sometime between July 16 and 24, 1994. Although Galileo was still 238 million kilometers (148 million miles) away, Jupiter was 66 pixels wide in its camera, and it was perfectly positioned to observe this event. Terrestrial telescopes had to wait to see the impact event sites as they rotated into view because it would occur on Jupiter's night side.

Instead of burning up in Jupiter's atmosphere as expected, the first of the 21 comet fragments struck the planet at around 320,000 kilometers per hour (200,000 mph) and exploded with a fireball 3,000 kilometers (1,900 mi) high, easily discernible to Earth-based telescopes even though it was on the night side of the planet. The impact left a series of dark scars on the planet, some two or three times as large as the Earth, that persisted for weeks. When Galileo observed an impact in ultraviolet light, the fireballs lasted for about ten seconds, but in the infrared they persisted for 90 seconds or more. When a fragment hit the planet, it increased Jupiter's overall brightness by about 20 percent. The NIMS observed one fragment create a fireball 7 kilometers (4.3 mi) in diameter that burned with a temperature of 8,000 K (7,700 °C; 14,000 °F), which was hotter than the surface of the Sun.

=== Probe deployment ===
The Galileo probe separated from the orbiter at 03:07 UTC on July 13, 1995, five months before its rendezvous with the planet on December 7. At this point, the spacecraft was 83 million kilometers (52 million miles) from Jupiter, but 664 million kilometers (413×10^{6} mi) from Earth, and telemetry from the spacecraft, transmitted at the speed of light, took 37 minutes to reach JPL. A tiny frequency change in the radio signal indicated that the separation had been accomplished. The Galileo orbiter was still on a collision course with Jupiter. Previously, course corrections had been made using the twelve 10-newton (2.2 lb_{f}) thrusters, but with the probe on its way, the Galileo orbiter could now fire its 400-newton (90 lb_{f}) Messerschmitt-Bölkow-Blohm main engine which had been covered by the probe until then. At 07:38 UTC on July 27, it was fired for the first time to place the Galileo orbiter on course to enter orbit around Jupiter, whence it would act as a communications relay for the Galileo probe. The Galileo probe's project manager, Marcie Smith at the Ames Research Center, was confident that the LGAs could be used as relays. The burn lasted for five minutes and eight seconds, and changed the velocity of the Galileo orbiter by 61.9 meters per second (203 ft/s).

=== Dust storms ===
In August 1995, the Galileo orbiter encountered a severe dust storm 63 million kilometers (39×10^{6} mi) from Jupiter that took several months to traverse. Normally the spacecraft's dust detector picked up a dust particle every three days; now it detected up to 20,000 particles a day. Interplanetary dust storms had previously been encountered by the Ulysses probe, which had passed by Jupiter three years before on its mission to study the Sun's polar regions, but those encountered by Galileo were more intense. The dust particles were 5 to 10 nm in size, about the same as those in cigarette smoke, and had speeds ranging from 140,000 to 720,000 kilometers per hour (90,000 to 450,000 mph) depending on their size. The existence of the dust storms had come as a complete surprise to scientists when Ulysses encountered them. While data from both Ulysses and Galileo hinted that they originated somewhere in the Jovian system, it was a mystery how they had been created and how they had escaped from Jupiter's strong gravitational and electromagnetic fields.

=== Tape recorder anomaly ===
The failure of Galileo's high-gain antenna meant that data storage to the tape recorder for later compression and playback was crucial in order to obtain any substantial information from the flybys of Jupiter and its moons. The four-track, 114-megabyte digital tape recorder was manufactured by Odetics Corporation. On October 11, it was stuck in rewind mode for 15 hours before engineers learned what had happened and were able to send commands to shut it off. Although the recorder itself was still in working order, the malfunction had possibly damaged a length of tape at the end of the reel. This section of tape was declared "off limits" to any future data recording, and was covered with 25 more turns of tape to secure the section and reduce any further stresses, which could tear it. Because it happened only weeks before Galileo entered orbit around Jupiter, the anomaly prompted engineers to sacrifice data acquisition of almost all of the Io and Europa observations during the orbit insertion phase in order to focus on recording data sent from the atmospheric probe during its descent.

== Jupiter ==
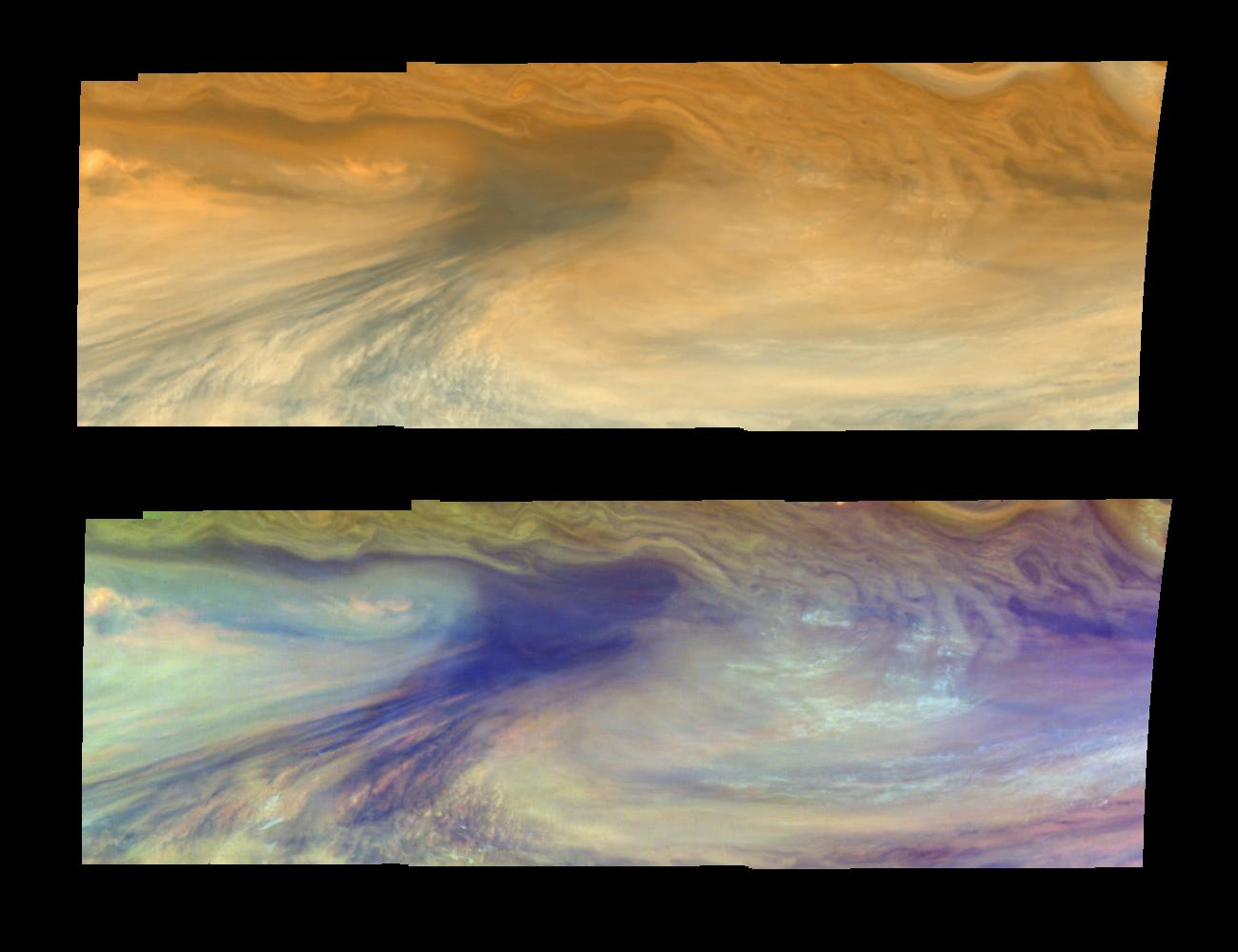
True and false color images of Jupiter's cloud layers

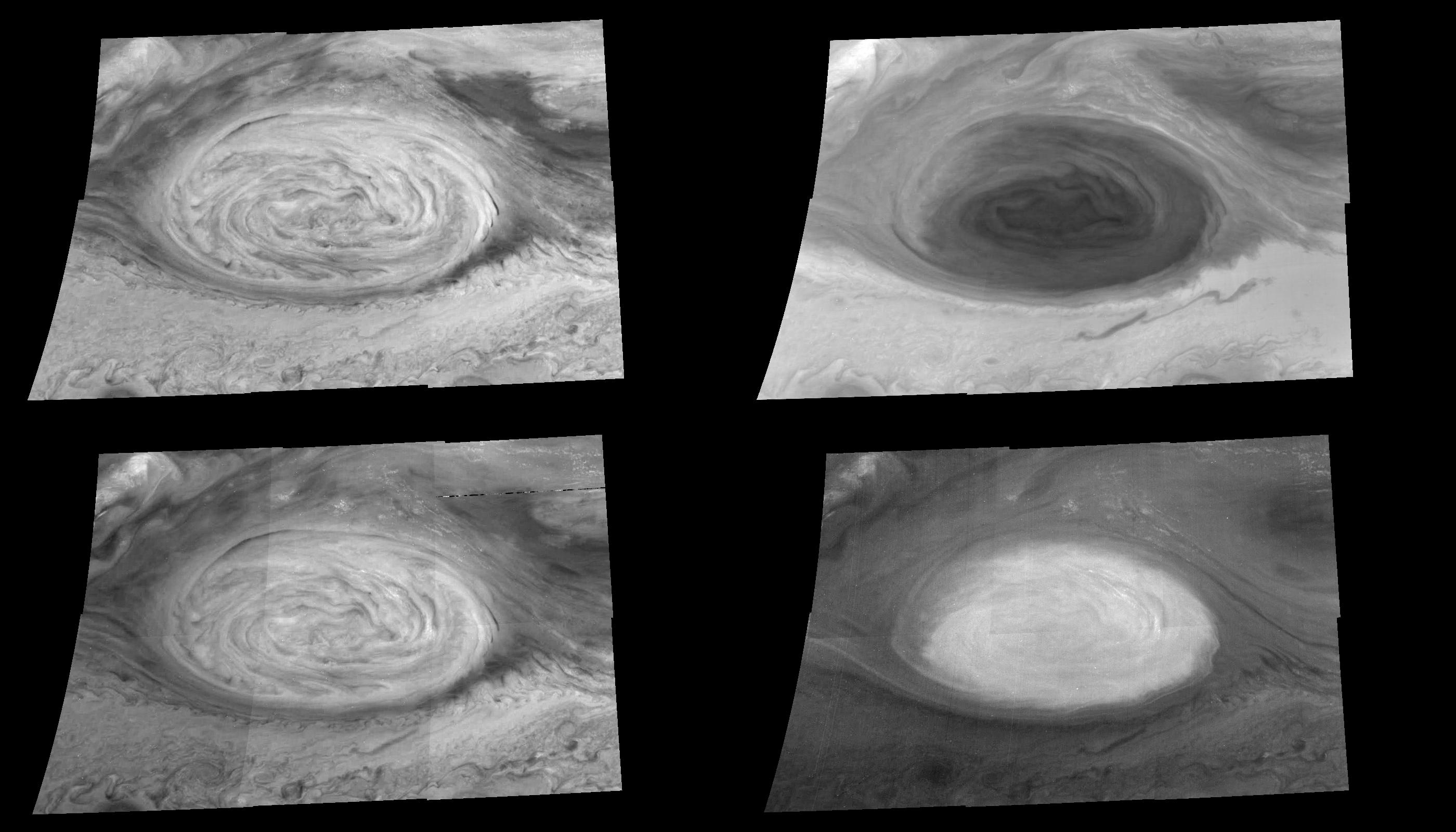
Jupiter's Great Red Spot at 757 nm, 415 nm, 732 nm, and 886 nm

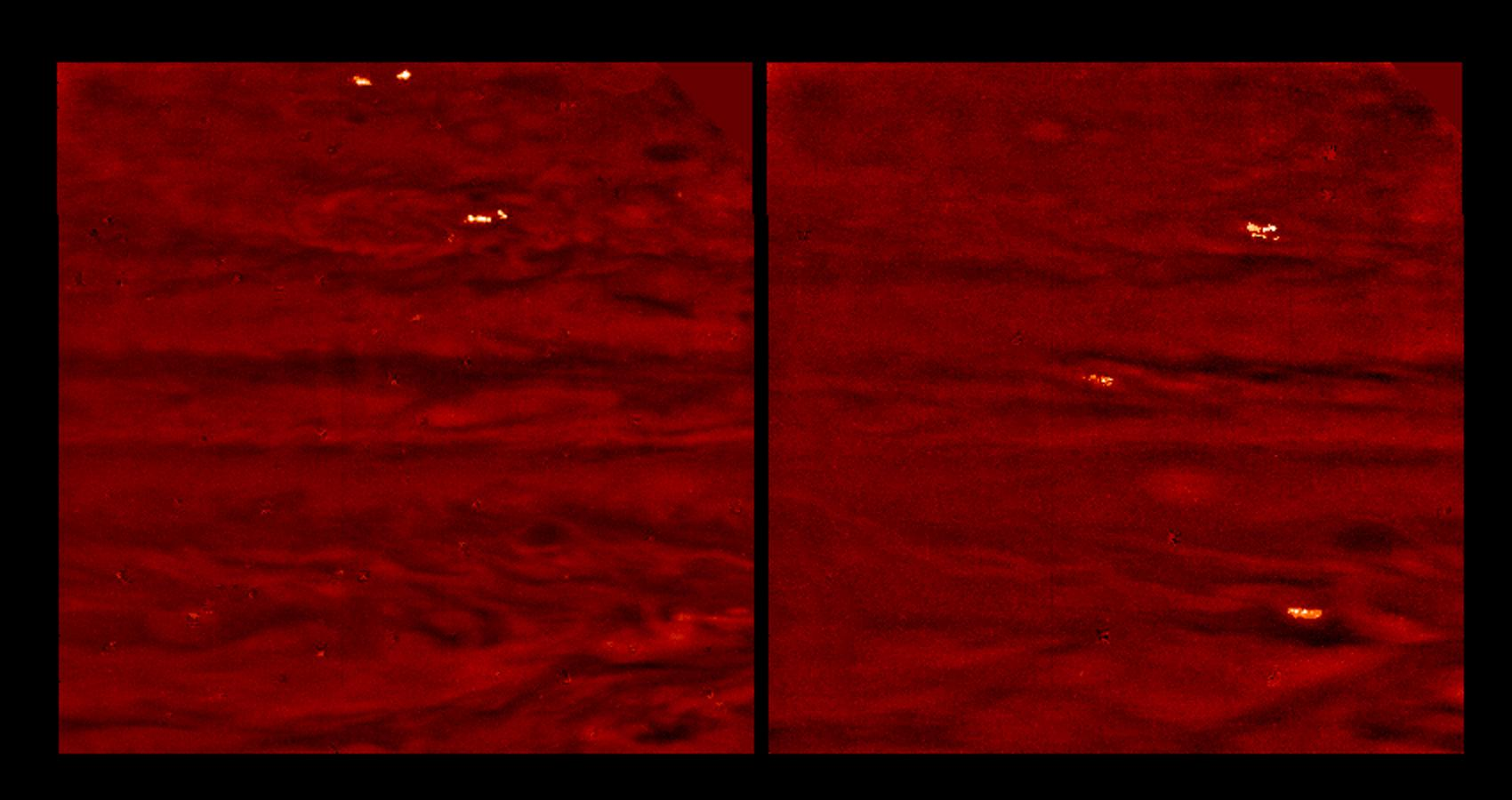
Jovian lightning amidst clouds lit by Io's moonlight

=== Arrival ===
The Galileo orbiter's magnetometers reported that the spacecraft had encountered the bow shock of Jupiter's magnetosphere on November 16, 1995, when it was 15 million kilometers (9.3 million miles) from Jupiter. The bow shock moved to and fro in response to solar wind gusts, and was therefore crossed multiple times between 16 and 26 November, by which time Galileo was 9 million kilometers (5.6 million miles) from Jupiter.

On December 7, 1995, the orbiter arrived in the Jovian system. That day it made a 32,500-kilometer (20,200 mi) flyby of Europa at 11:09 UTC, and then an 890-kilometer (550 mi) flyby of Io at 15:46 UTC, using Io's gravity to reduce its speed, and thereby conserve propellant for use later in the mission. At 19:54 it made its closest approach to Jupiter. The orbiter's electronics had been heavily shielded against radiation, but the radiation surpassed expectations, and nearly exceeded the spacecraft's design limits. One of the navigational systems failed, but the backup took over. Most robotic spacecraft respond to failures by entering safe mode and awaiting further instructions from Earth, but this was not possible for Galileo during the arrival sequence due to the great distance and consequent long turnaround time.

=== Atmospheric probe ===
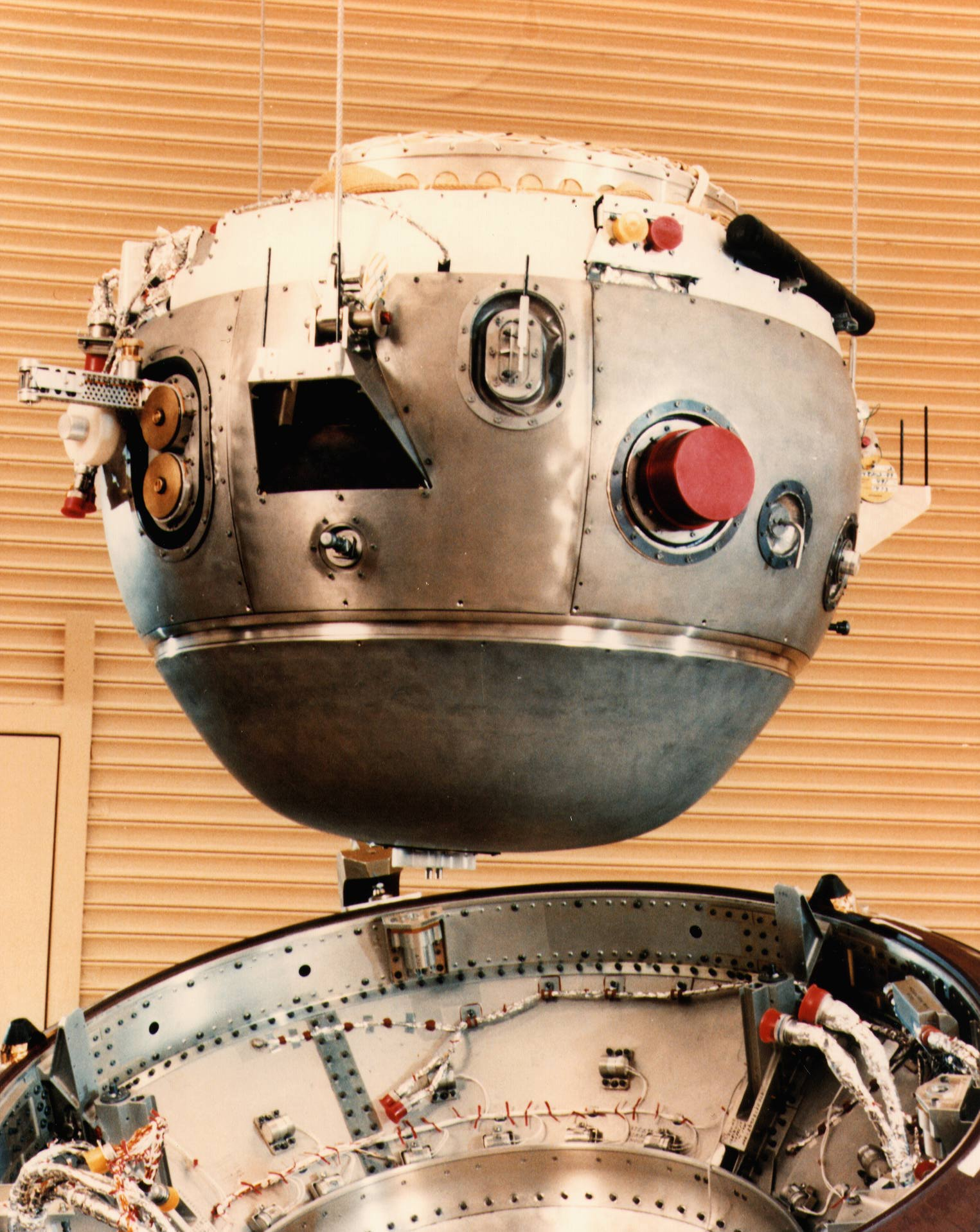
Inner descent module of the Galileo entry probe

The descent probe awoke in response to an alarm at 16:00 UTC and began powering up its instruments. It passed through the rings of Jupiter and encountered a previously undiscovered radiation belt ten times as strong as Earth's Van Allen radiation belt 50,000 kilometers (31,000 mi) above Jupiter's cloud tops. It had been predicted that the probe would pass through three layers of clouds: an upper one consisting of ammonia-ice particles at a pressure of 0.5 to 0.6 bars (7.3 to 8.7 psi); a middle one of ammonium hydrosulfide ice particles at a pressure of 1.5 to 2 bars (22 to 29 psi); and one of water vapor at 4 to 5 bars (58 to 73 psi). The atmosphere through which the probe descended was much denser and hotter than expected. Jupiter was also found to have only half the amount of helium expected and the data did not support the three-layered cloud structure theory: only one significant cloud layer was measured by the probe, at a pressure of around 1.55 bars (22.5 psi) but with many indications of smaller areas of increased particle densities along the whole length of its trajectory.

The descent probe entered Jupiter's atmosphere, defined for the purpose as being 450 kilometers (280 mi) above the 1-bar (15 psi) pressure level, without any braking at 22:04 UTC on December 7, 1995. At this point it was moving at 170,700 kilometers per hour (106,100 mph) relative to Jupiter. This was by far the most difficult atmospheric entry yet attempted by any spacecraft; the probe had to withstand a peak deceleration of 228 g_{0} (2,240 m/s^{2}). The rapid flight through the atmosphere produced a plasma with a temperature of about 14,000 °C (25,200 °F), and the probe's carbon phenolic heat shield lost more than half of its mass, 80 kilograms (180 lb), during the descent. As the probe passed through Jupiter's cloud tops, it started transmitting data to the orbiter, 215,000 kilometers (134,000 mi) above. The data was not immediately relayed to Earth, but a single bit was transmitted from the orbiter as a notification that the signal from the probe was being received and recorded, which would then take days to be transmitted using the LGA.

The atmospheric probe deployed its 2.5-meter (8.2-foot) parachute fifty-three seconds later than anticipated, resulting in a small loss of upper-atmospheric readings. This was attributed to wiring problems with an accelerometer that determined when to begin the parachute deployment sequence. The probe then dropped its heat shield, which fell into Jupiter's interior. The parachute reduced the probe's speed to 430 kilometers per hour (270 mph). The signal from the probe was no longer detected by the orbiter after 61.4 minutes, at an elevation of 180 kilometers (112 miles) below the cloud tops and a pressure of 23.0 bars (334 psi; 22.7 atm). It was believed that the probe continued to fall at terminal velocity, as the temperature increased to 1,700 °C (3,090 °F) and the pressure to 5,100 bars (73,000 psi; 5,000 atm), destroying it.

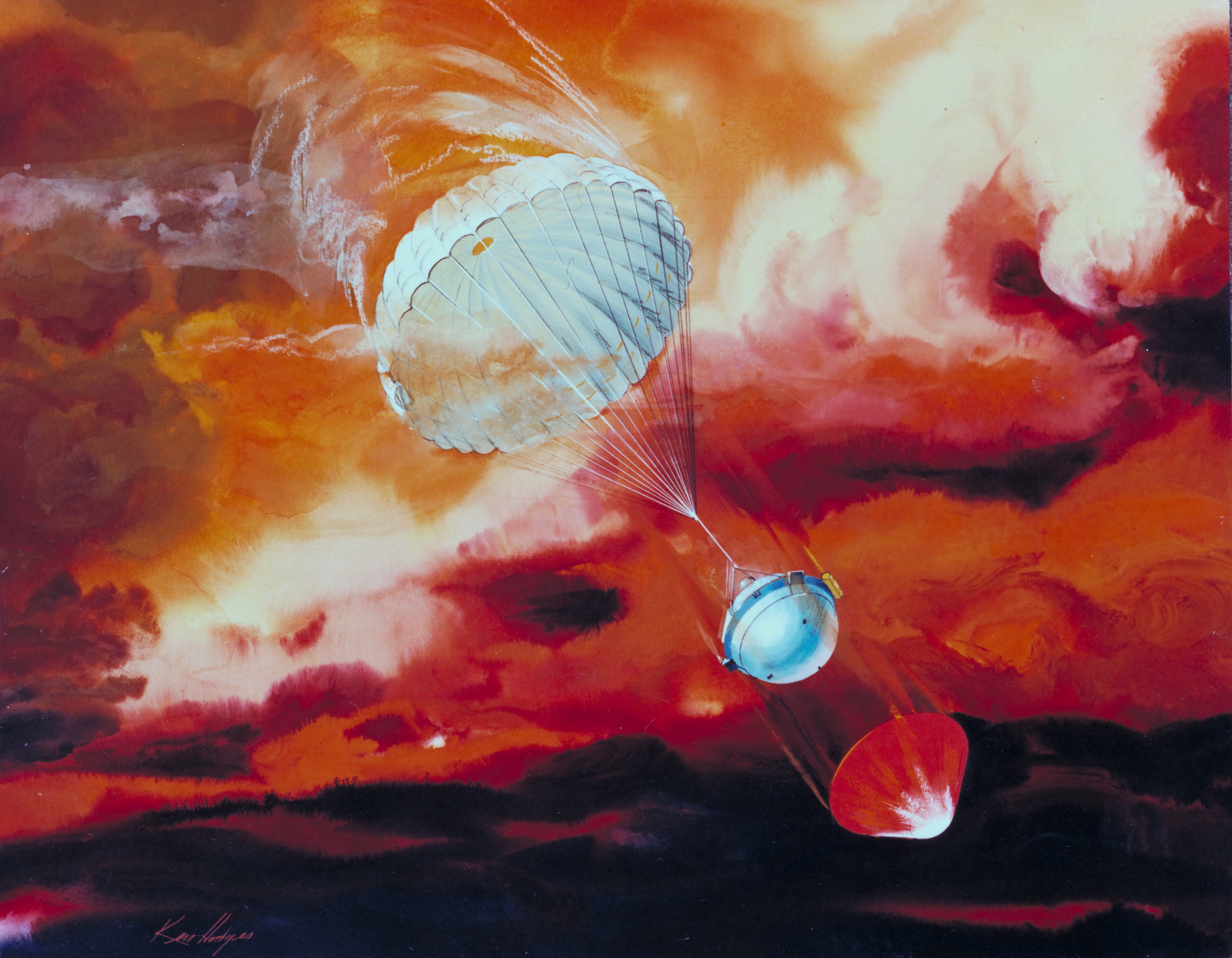
Artist's impression of the probe's entry into Jupiter's atmosphere

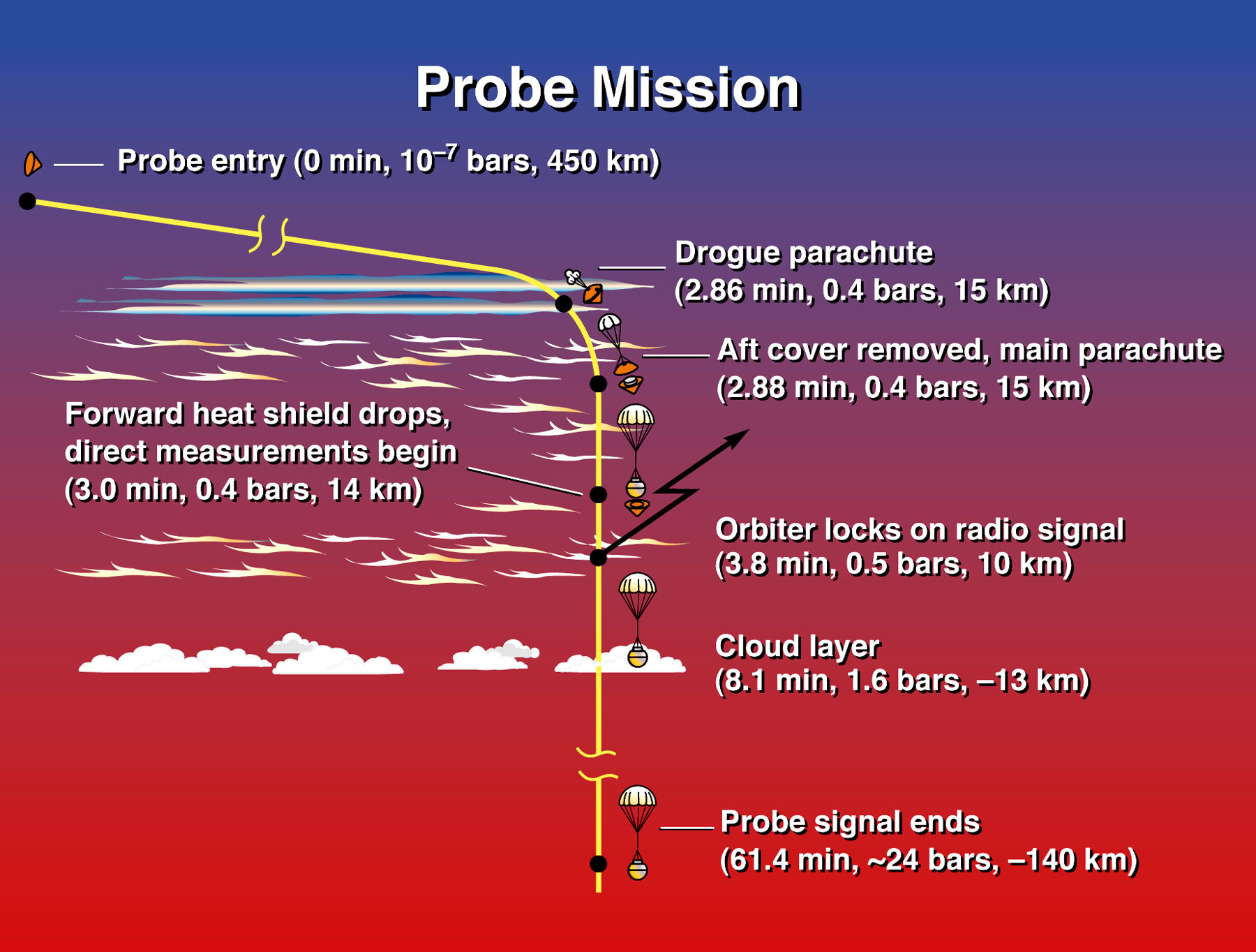
Timeline of the probe's atmospheric entry

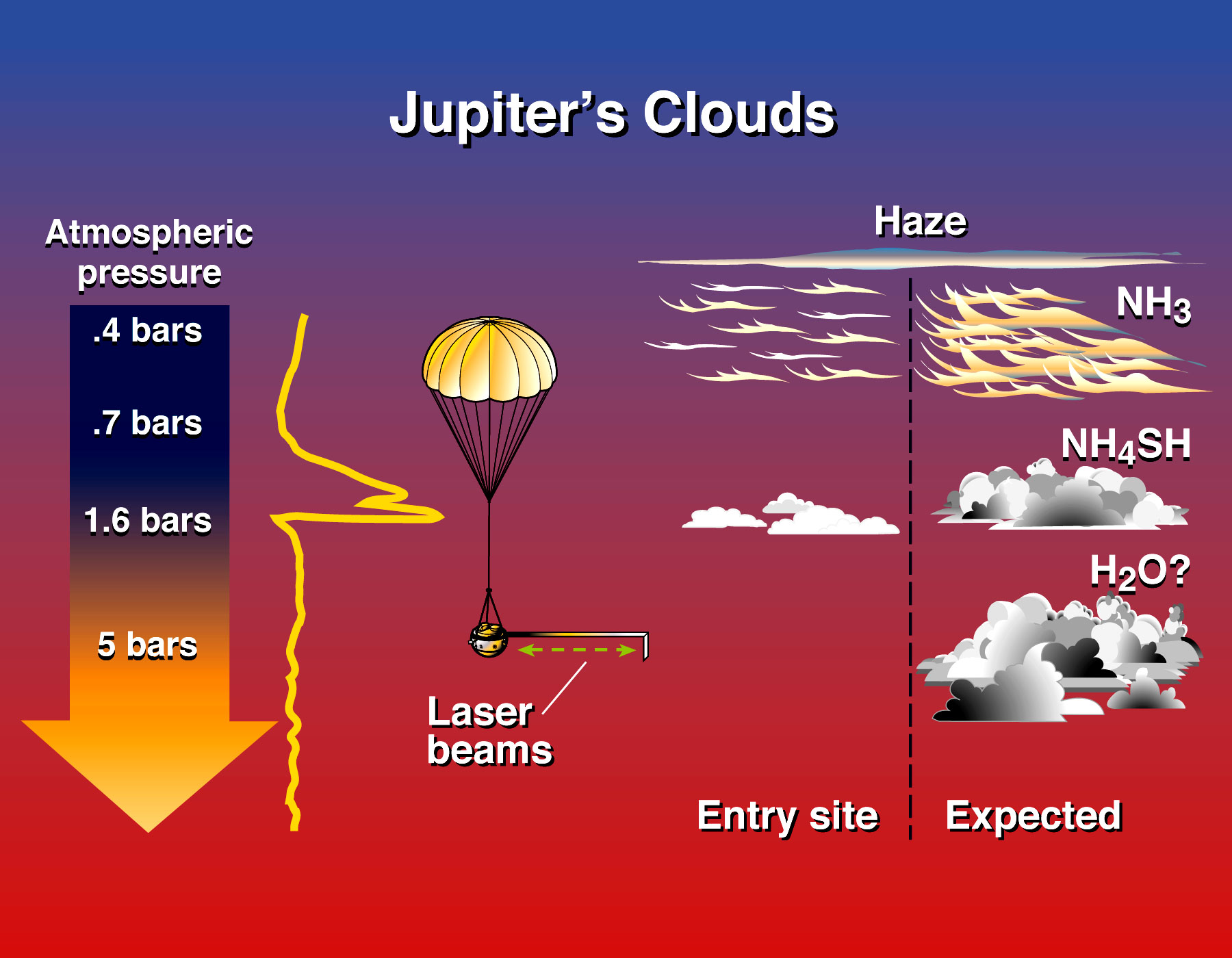
Jupiter's clouds – expected and actual results of Galileo's atmospheric probe mission

The probe detected less lightning, less water, but stronger winds than expected. Scientists had expected to find wind speeds of up to 350 kilometers per hour (220 mph), but winds of up to 530 kilometers per hour (330 mph) were detected. The implication was that the winds are not produced by heat generated by sunlight (as Jupiter gets less sunlight than Earth) or the condensation of water vapor (the main causes on Earth), but are due to an internal heat source. It was already well known that the atmosphere of Jupiter was mainly composed of hydrogen, but the clouds of ammonia and ammonium sulfide were much thinner than expected, and clouds of water vapor were not detected. This was the first observation of ammonia clouds in another planet's atmosphere. The atmosphere creates ammonia-ice particles from material coming up from lower depths.

The atmosphere was more turbulent than expected. Wind speeds in the outermost layers were 290 to 360 kilometers per hour (180 to 220 mph), in agreement with previous measurements from afar, but those wind speeds increased dramatically at pressure levels of 1 to 4 bars (15 to 58 psi), then remaining consistently high at around 610 kilometers per hour (170 m/s). The abundance of nitrogen, carbon and sulfur was three times that of the Sun, raising the possibility that they had been acquired from other bodies in the Solar system, but the low abundance of water cast doubt on theories that Earth's water had been acquired from comets.

There was far less lightning activity than expected, only about a tenth of the level of activity on Earth, but this was consistent with the lack of water vapor. More surprising was the high abundance of noble gases (argon, krypton and xenon), with abundances up to three times that found in the Sun. For Jupiter to trap these gases, it would have had to be much colder than today, around −240 °C (−400 °F), which suggested that either Jupiter had once been much further from the Sun, or that the interstellar debris that the Solar system had formed from was much colder than had been thought.

=== Orbiter ===
Animation of Galileo's trajectory around Jupiter from August 1, 1995, to September 30, 2003 Galileo · Jupiter · Io · Europa · Ganymede · Callisto

With the probe data collected, the Galileo orbiter's next task was to slow down in order to avoid heading off into the outer solar system. A burn sequence commencing at 00:27 UTC on December 8 and lasting 49 minutes reduced the spacecraft's speed by 600 meters per second (2,000 ft/s) and it entered a parking orbit with an orbital period of 198 days. The Galileo orbiter thus became the first artificial satellite of Jupiter. Most of its initial orbit was occupied transmitting the data from the probe back to Earth. When the orbiter reached its apojove on March 26, 1996, the main engine was fired again to increase the orbit from four times the radius of Jupiter to ten times. By this time the orbiter had received half the radiation allowed for in the mission plan, and the higher orbit was to conserve the instruments for as long as possible by limiting the radiation exposure.

The spacecraft traveled around Jupiter in elongated ellipses, each orbit lasting about two months. The differing distances from Jupiter afforded by these orbits allowed Galileo to sample different parts of the planet's extensive magnetosphere. The orbits were designed for close-up flybys of Jupiter's largest moons. A naming scheme was devised for the orbits: a code with the first letter of the moon being encountered on that orbit (or "J" if none was encountered) plus the orbit number.

=== Mission extension ===
After the primary mission concluded on December 7, 1997, most of the mission staff departed, including O'Neil, but about a fifth of them remained. The Galileo orbiter commenced an extended mission known as the Galileo Europa Mission (GEM), which ran until December 31, 1999. This was a low-cost mission, with a budget of $30 million (equivalent to $56 million in 2025). The reason for calling it as the "Europa" mission rather than the "Extended" mission was political; although it was wasteful to scrap a spacecraft that was still functional and capable of performing a continuing mission, Congress took a dim view of requests for more money for projects that had already been fully funded. This was avoided through rebranding.

The smaller GEM team did not have the resources to deal with problems, but when they arose it was able to temporarily recall former team members for intensive efforts to solve them. The spacecraft performed several flybys of Europa, Callisto and Io. On each one the spacecraft collected only two days' worth of data instead of the seven it had collected during the prime mission. The radiation environment near Io, which Galileo approached to within 201 kilometers (125 mi) on November 26, 1999, on orbit I25, was very unhealthy for Galileo's systems, and so these flybys were saved for the extended mission when loss of the spacecraft would be more acceptable.

By the time GEM ended, most of the spacecraft was operating well beyond its original design specifications, having absorbed more than 600 kilorads in between 1995 and 2002, three times the radiation exposure that it had been built to withstand. Many of the instruments were no longer operating at peak performance, but were still functional, so a second extension, the Galileo Millennium Mission (GMM) was authorized. This was intended to run until March 2001, but it was subsequently extended until January 2003. GMM included return visits to Europa, Io, Ganymede and Callisto, and for the first time to Amalthea. The total cost of the original Galileo mission was about US$1.39 billion (equivalent to $2 billion in 2025). Of this, US$892 million (equivalent to $1494 million in 2025) was spent on spacecraft development. Another $110 million (equivalent to $184 million in 2025) was contributed by international agencies.

=== Io ===
The innermost of the four Galilean moons, Io is roughly the same size as Earth's moon, with a mean radius of 1,821.3 kilometers (1,131.7 mi). It is in orbital resonance with Ganymede and Europa, and tidally locked with Jupiter, so just as the Earth's Moon always has the same side facing Earth, Io always has the same side facing Jupiter. It has a faster orbit though, with a rotation period of 1.769 days. As a result, the rotational and tidal forces on Io are 220 times as great as those on Earth's moon. These frictional forces are sufficient to melt rock, creating volcanoes and lava flows. Although only a third of the size of Earth, Io generates twice as much heat. While geological events occur on Earth over periods of thousands or even millions of years, cataclysmic events are common on Io. Visible changes occurred between orbits of Galileo. The colorful surface is a mixture of red, white and yellow sulfur compounds.

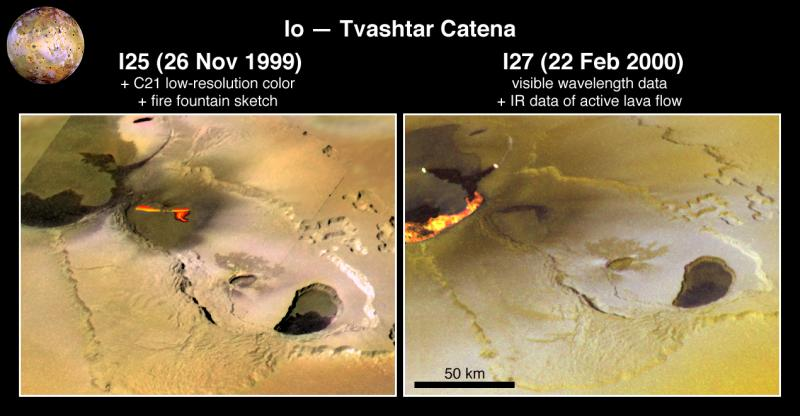
Tvashtar Catena on Io, showing changes in hot spots between 1999 and 2000. Infrared imaging shows a hot lava flow more than 60 kilometres (37 mi) long.

Galileo flew past Io, but in the interest of protecting the tape recorder, O'Neil decided to forego collecting images. To use the SSI camera meant operating the tape recorder at high speed, with sudden stops and starts, whereas the fields and particles instruments only required the tape recorder to run continuously at slow speeds, and it was believed that it could handle this. This was a crushing blow to scientists, some of whom had waited years for the opportunity. No other Io encounters were scheduled during the prime mission because it was feared that the high radiation levels close to Jupiter would damage the spacecraft. However, valuable information was still obtained; Doppler data used to measure Io's gravitational field revealed that Io had a core of molten iron and iron sulfide.

Another opportunity to observe Io arose during the Galileo Europa Mission (GEM), when Galileo flew past Io on orbits I24 and I25, and it would revisit Io during the Galileo Millennium Mission (GMM) on orbits I27, I31, I32 and I33. As Galileo approached Io on I24 at 11:09 UTC on October 11, 1999, it entered safe mode. Apparently, high-energy electrons had altered a bit on a memory chip. When it entered safe mode, the spacecraft turned off all non-essential functions. Normally it took seven to ten days to diagnose and recover from a safe mode incident; this time the Galileo Project team at JPL had nineteen hours before the encounter with Io. After a frantic effort, they managed to diagnose a problem that had never been seen before, and restore the spacecraft systems with just two hours to spare. Not all of the planned activities could be carried out, but Galileo obtained a series of high-resolution color images of the Pillan Patera, and Zamama, Prometheus, and Pele volcanic eruption centers.

When Galileo next approached Io on I25 at 03:40 UTC on November 26, 1999, JPL were eating their Thanksgiving dinner at the Galileo Mission Control Center when, with the encounter with Io just four hours away, the spacecraft again entered safe mode. This time the problem was traced to a software patch implemented to bring Galileo out of safe mode during I24. Fortunately, the spacecraft had not shut down as much as it had on I24, and the team at JPL were able to bring it back online. During I24 they had done so with two hours to spare; this time, they had just three minutes. Nonetheless, the flyby was successful, with Galileo's NIMS and SSI camera capturing an erupting volcano that generated a 32-kilometer (20 mi) long plume of lava that was sufficiently large and hot to have also been detected by the NASA Infrared Telescope Facility atop Mauna Kea in Hawaii. While such events were more common and spectacular on Io than on Earth, it was extremely fortuitous to have captured it; planetary scientist Alfred McEwen estimated the odds at 1 in 500.

Io in sped-up motion; a rotation actually takes 1.769 days

The safe-mode incidents on I24 and I25 left some gaps in the data, which I27 targeted. This time Galileo passed 198 kilometers (123 mi) over the surface of Io. At this time, the spacecraft was nearly at the maximum distance from Earth, and there was a solar conjunction, a period when the Sun blocked the line of sight between Earth and Jupiter. As a consequence, three quarters of the observations had to be taken over a period of three hours. NIMS images revealed fourteen active volcanoes in a region thought to contain just four. Images of Loki Patera showed that in the four and half months between I24 and I27, some 10,000 square kilometers (3,900 sq mi) had been covered in fresh lava. A series of observations of extreme ultraviolet (EUV) had to be cancelled due to yet another safe-mode event. Radiation exposure caused a transient bus reset, a computer hardware error resulting in a safe mode event. A software patch implemented after the Europa encounter on orbit E19 guarded against this when the spacecraft was within 15 Jupiter radii of the planet, but this time it occurred at 29 Jupiter radii. The safe mode event also caused a loss of tape playback time, but the project managers decided to carry over some Io data into orbit G28, and play it back then. This limited the amount of tape space available for that Ganymede encounter, but the Io data was considered to be more valuable.

The discovery of Io's iron core raised the possibility that it had a magnetic field. The I24, I25 and I27 encounters had involved passes over Io's equator, which made it difficult to determine whether Io had its own magnetic field or one induced by Jupiter. Accordingly, on orbit I31, Galileo passed within 200 kilometers (120 mi) of the surface of the north pole of Io, and on orbit I32 it flew 181 kilometers (112 mi) over the south pole. After examining the magnetometer results, planetary scientist Margaret G. Kivelson, announced that Io had no intrinsic magnetic field, which meant that its molten iron core did not have the same convective properties as that of Earth.

On I31 Galileo sped through an area that had been in the plume of the Tvashtar Paterae volcano, and it was hoped that the plume could be sampled. This time, Tvashtar was quiet, but the spacecraft flew through the plume of another, previously unknown, volcano 600 kilometers (370 mi) away. What had been assumed to be hot ash from the volcanic eruption turned out to be sulfur dioxide snowflakes, each consisting of 15 to 20 molecules clustered together. Galileo's final return to Io on orbit I33 was marred by another safe mode incident, and much of the hoped-for data was lost.

=== Europa ===
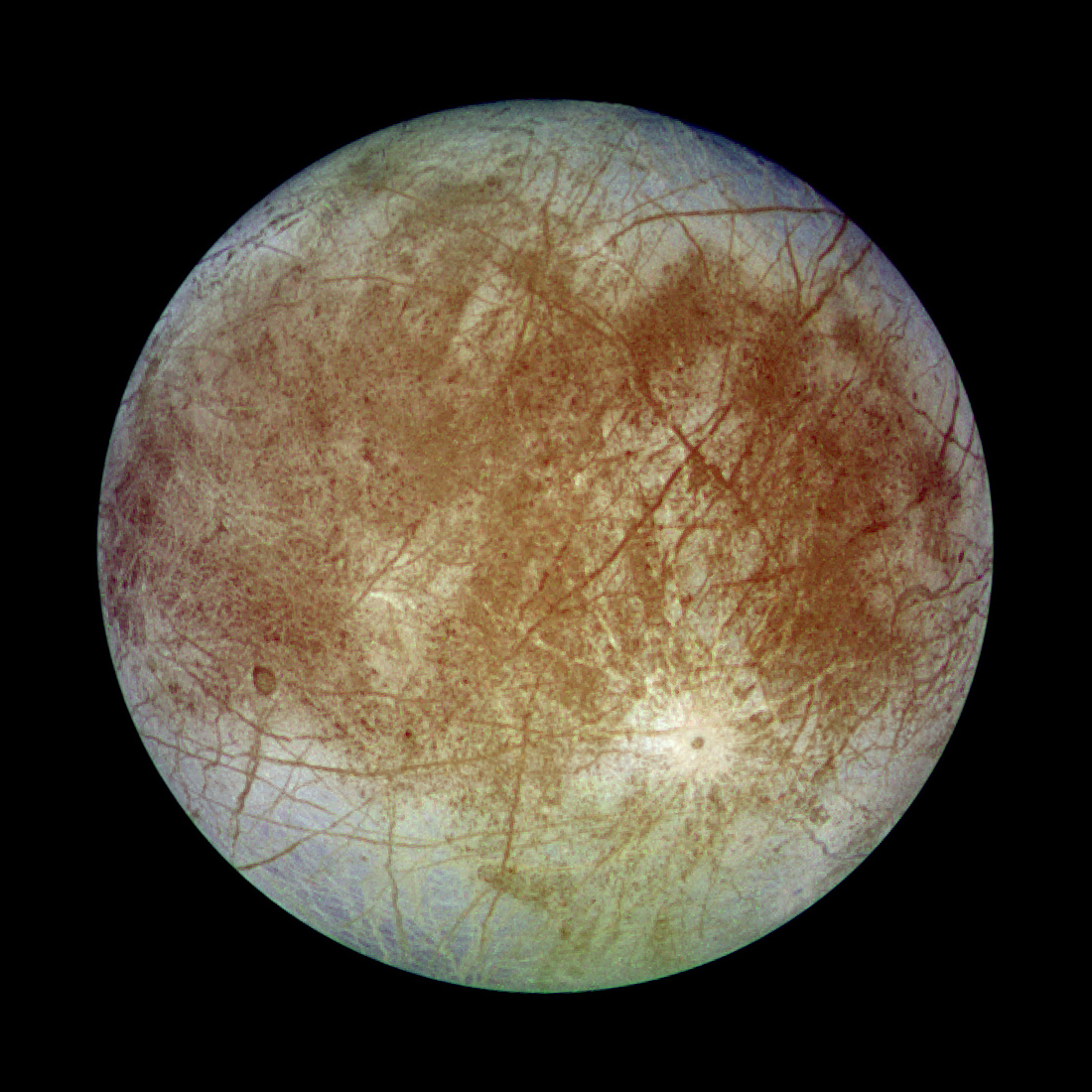
Europa photographed by Galileo

Although the smallest of the four Galilean moons, with a radius of 1,565 kilometers (972 mi), Europa is the sixth-largest moon in the solar system. Observations from Earth indicated that it was covered in ice. Like Io, Europa is tidally locked with Jupiter. It is in orbital resonance with Io and Ganymede, with its 85-hour orbit being twice that of Io, but half that of Ganymede. Conjunctions with Io always occur on the opposite side of Jupiter to those with Ganymede. Europa is therefore subject to tidal effects. There is no evidence of volcanism like on Io, but Galileo revealed that the surface ice was covered in cracks.

Some observations of Europa were made during orbits G1 and G2. On C3, Galileo conducted a 34,800-kilometer (21,600 mi) "nontargeted" encounter of Europa—meaning a secondary flyby at a distance of up to 100,000 kilometers (62,000 mi)—on November 6, 1996. During E4 from December 15 to 22, 1996, Galileo flew within 692 kilometers (430 mi) of Europa, but data transmission was hindered by a Solar occultation that blocked transmission for ten days.

Galileo returned to Europa on E6 in January 1997, this time at a height of 586 kilometers (364 mi), to analyze oval-shaped features in the infrared and ultraviolet spectra. Occultations by Europa, Io and Jupiter provided data on the atmospheric profiles of them, and measurements were made of Europa's gravitational field. On E11 from November 2 to 9, 1997, data was collected on the magnetosphere. Due to the problems with the HGA, only about two percent of the anticipated number of images of Europa were obtained by the primary mission. On the GEM, the first eight orbits (E12 through E19) were all dedicated to Europa, and Galileo paid it a final visit on E26 during the GMM.

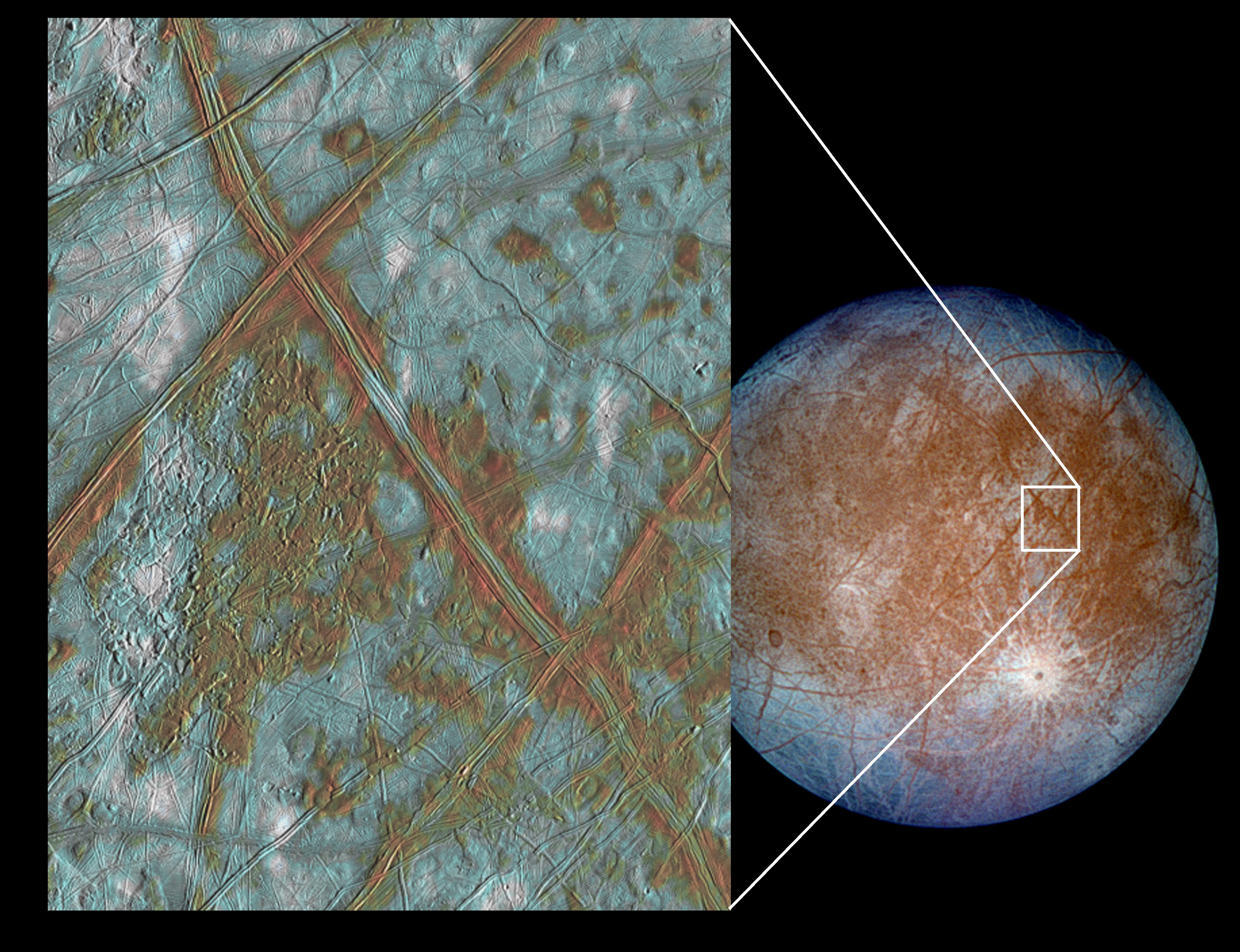
This false color image on the left shows a region of Europa's crust made up of blocks which are thought to have broken apart and "rafted" into new positions.

Images of Europa also showed few impact craters. It seemed unlikely that it had escaped the meteor and comet impacts that scarred Ganymede and Callisto, so this indicated Europa has an active geology that renews the surface and obliterates craters. Astronomer Clark Chapman argued that, assuming a 20-kilometer (12 mi) crater occurs in Europa once every million years, and given only about twenty have been spotted on Europa, the implication is that the surface must only be about 10 million years old. With more data on hand, in 2003 a team led by Kevin Zahle at NASA's Ames Research Center arrived at a figure of 30 to 70 million years. Tidal flexing of up to 100 meters (330 ft) per day was the most likely culprit. But not all scientists were convinced; Michael Carr, a planetologist from the US Geological Survey, argued that, on the contrary, Europa's surface age was closer to a billion years. He compared the craters on Ganymede with those on Earth's moon, and concluded that the satellites of Jupiter were not subject to the same amount of cratering.

Evidence of surface renewal hinted at the possibility of a viscous layer below the surface of warm ice or liquid water. NIMS observations by Galileo indicated that the surface of Europa appeared to contain magnesium- and sodium-based salts. A likely source was brine below the ice crust. Further evidence was provided by the magnetometer, which reported that the magnetic field was induced by Jupiter. This could be explained by the existence of a spherical shell of conductive material like salt water. Since the surface temperature on Europa was −162 °C (−260 °F), any water breaching the surface ice would instantly freeze over. Heat required to keep water in a liquid state could not come from the Sun, which at that distance had only 4 percent of the intensity it had on Earth, but ice is a good insulator, and the heat could be provided by the tidal flexing. Galileo also yielded evidence that the crust of Europa had slipped over time, moving south on the hemisphere facing Jupiter, and north on the far side.

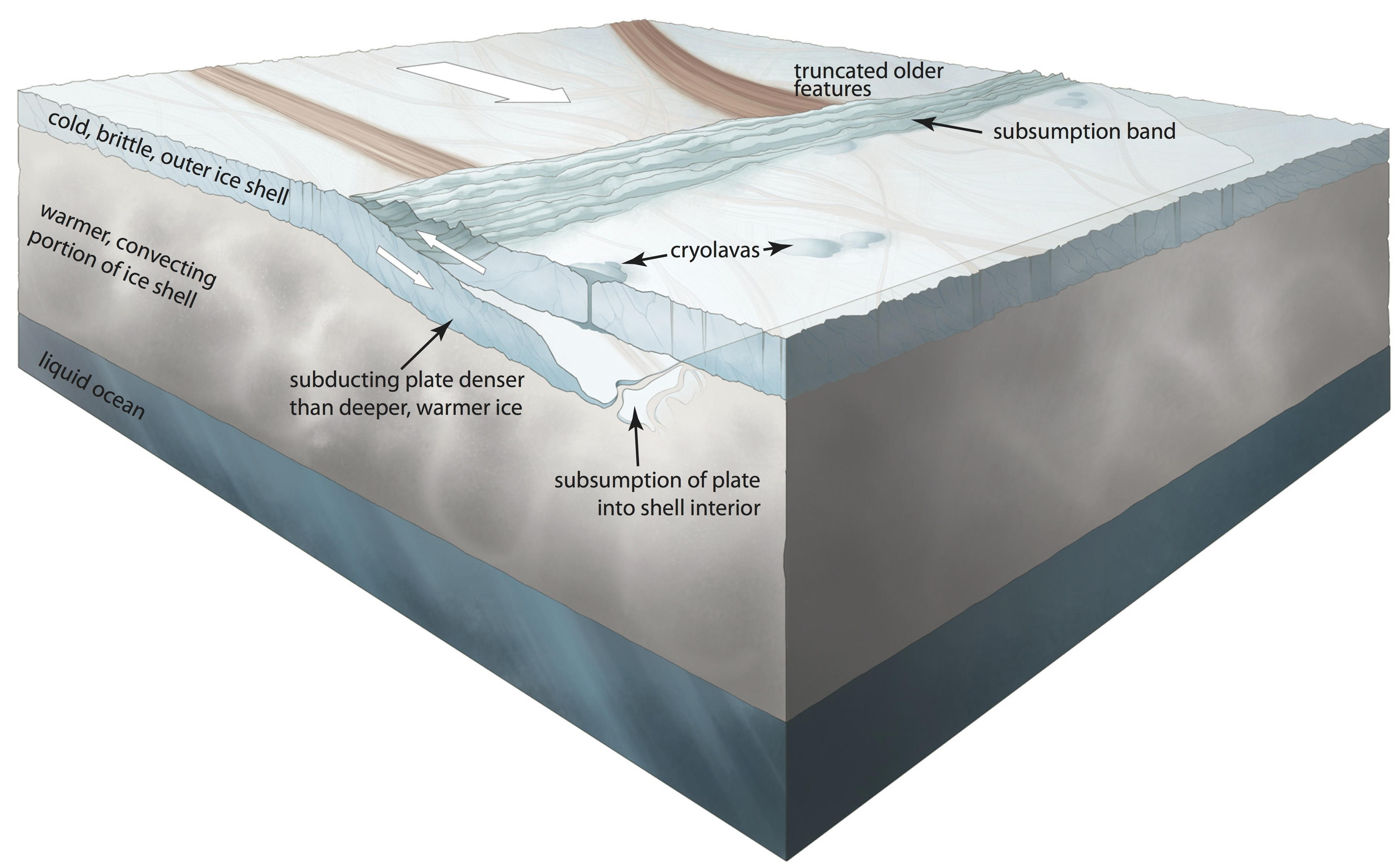
Plate tectonics on Europa

There was acrimonious debate among scientists over the thickness of the ice crust, and those who presented results indicating that it might be thinner than the 20 to 30 kilometers (12 to 19 mi) proposed by the accredited scientists on the Galileo Imaging Team faced intimidation, scorn, and reduced career opportunities. The Galileo Imaging Team was led by Michael J. Belton from the Kitt Peak National Observatory. Scientists who planned imaging sequences had the exclusive right to the initial interpretation of the Galileo data, most which was performed by their research students. The scientific community did not want a repetition of the 1979 Morabito incident, when Linda A. Morabito, an engineer at JPL working on Voyager 1, discovered the first active extraterrestrial volcano on Io. The Imaging Team controlled the manner in which discoveries were presented to the scientific community and the public through press conferences, conference papers and publications.

Observations by the Hubble Space Telescope in 1995 reported that Europa had a thin oxygen atmosphere. This was confirmed by Galileo in six experiments on orbits E4 and E6 during occultations when Europa was between Galileo and the Earth. This allowed Canberra and Goldstone to investigate the ionosphere of Europa by measuring the degree to which the radio beam was diffracted by charged particles. This indicated the presence of water ions, which were most likely water molecules that had been dislodged from the surface ice and then ionized by the Sun or the Jovian magnetosphere. The presence of an ionosphere was sufficient to deduce the existence of a thin atmosphere on Europa.

On December 11, 2013, NASA reported, based on results from the Galileo mission, the detection of "clay-like minerals" (specifically, phyllosilicates), often associated with organic materials, on the icy crust of Europa. The presence of the minerals may have been the result of a collision with an asteroid or comet.

=== Ganymede ===
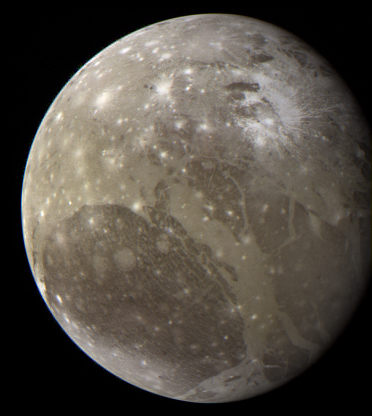
Ganymede, photographed on June 26, 1996

The largest of the Galilean moons with a radius of 2,620 kilometers (1,630 mi), Ganymede is larger than Earth's moon, the dwarf planet Pluto and the planet Mercury. It is the largest of the moons in the Solar system that are characterized by large amounts of water ice, which also includes Saturn's moon Titan, and Neptune's moon Triton. Ganymede has three times as much water for its mass as Earth has.

When Galileo entered Jovian orbit, it did so at an orbital inclination to the Jovian equator, and therefore in the orbital plane of the four Galilean moons. To transfer orbit while conserving propellant, two slingshot maneuvers were performed. On G1, the gravity of Ganymede was used to speed up the spacecraft's orbital period from 210 to 72 days to allow for more encounters and to take Galileo out of the more intense regions of radiation. On G2, the gravity assist was employed to put it into a coplanar orbit to permit subsequent encounters with Io, Europa and Callisto.

Although the primary purpose of G1 and G2 was navigational, the opportunity to make some observations was not missed. The plasma-wave experiment and the magnetometer detected a magnetic field with a strength of about 750 nanoteslas, more than strong enough to create a separate magnetosphere within that of Jupiter. (Note: Earth's magnetic field varies from 22,000 to 67,000 nanoteslas.) This was the first time that a magnetic field had ever been detected on a moon contained within the magnetosphere of its host planet. This discovery led naturally to questions about its origin. The evidence pointed to an iron or iron sulfide core and mantle 400 to 1,300 kilometers (250 to 810 mi) below the surface, encased in ice. Margaret Kivelson, the scientist in charge of the magnetometer experiment, contended that the induced magnetic field required an iron core, and speculated that an electrically conductive layer was required, possibly a brine ocean 200 kilometers (120 mi) below the surface.

The internal structure of Ganymede

Galileo returned to Ganymede on orbits G7 and G9 in April and May 1997, and on G28 and G29 in May and December 2000 on the GMM. Images of the surface revealed two types of terrain: highly cratered dark regions and grooved terrain sulcus. Images of the Arbela Sulcus taken on G28 made Ganymede look more like Europa, but tidal flexing could not provide sufficient heat to keep water in liquid form on Ganymede, although it may have made a contribution. One possibility was radioactivity, which might provide sufficient heat for liquid water to exist 50 to 200 kilometers (31 to 124 mi) below the surface. Another possibility was volcanism. Slushy water or ice reaching the surface would quickly freeze over, creating areas of a relatively smooth surface.

=== Callisto ===
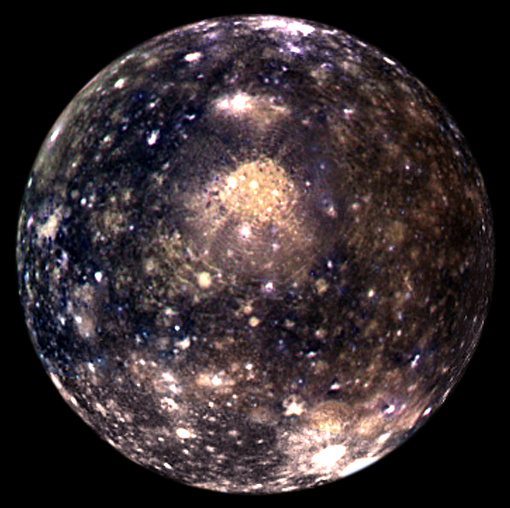
Callisto, photographed by Galileo

Callisto is the outermost of the Galilean moons, and the most pockmarked, indeed the most of any body in the Solar system. So many craters must have taken billions of years to accumulate, which gave scientists the idea that its surface was as much as four billion years old, and provided a record of meteor activity in the Solar system. Galileo visited Callisto on orbits C3, C9 and C10 during the prime mission, and then on C20, C21, C22 and C23 during the GEM. When the cameras observed Callisto close up, there was a puzzling absence of small craters. The surface features appeared to have been eroded, indicating that they had been subject to active geological processes.

Galileo's flyby of Callisto on C3 marked the first time that the Deep Space Network operated a link between its antennae in Canberra and Goldstone that allowed them to operate as a gigantic array, thereby enabling a higher bit rate. With the assistance of the antenna at Parkes, this raised the effective bandwidth to as much as 1,000 bits per second.

Data accumulated on C3 indicated that Callisto had a homogeneous composition, with heavy and light elements intermixed. This was estimated to be composed of 60 percent silicate, iron and iron sulfide rock and 40 percent water ice. This was overturned by further radio Doppler observations on C9 and C10, which indicated that rock had settled towards the core, and therefore that Callisto indeed has a differentiated internal structure, although not as much so as the other Galilean moons.

The internal structure of Callisto

Observations made with Galileo's magnetometer indicated that Callisto had no magnetic field of its own, and therefore lacked an iron core like Ganymede's, but that it did have an induced field from Jupiter's magnetosphere. Because ice is too poor a conductor to generate this effect, it pointed to the possibility that Callisto, like Europa and Ganymede, might have a subsurface ocean of brine. Galileo made its closest encounter with Callisto on C30, when it made a 138-kilometer (86 mi) pass over the surface, during which it photographed the Asgard, Valhalla and Bran craters. This was used for slingshot maneuvers to set up the final encounters with Io on I31 and I32.

=== Amalthea ===
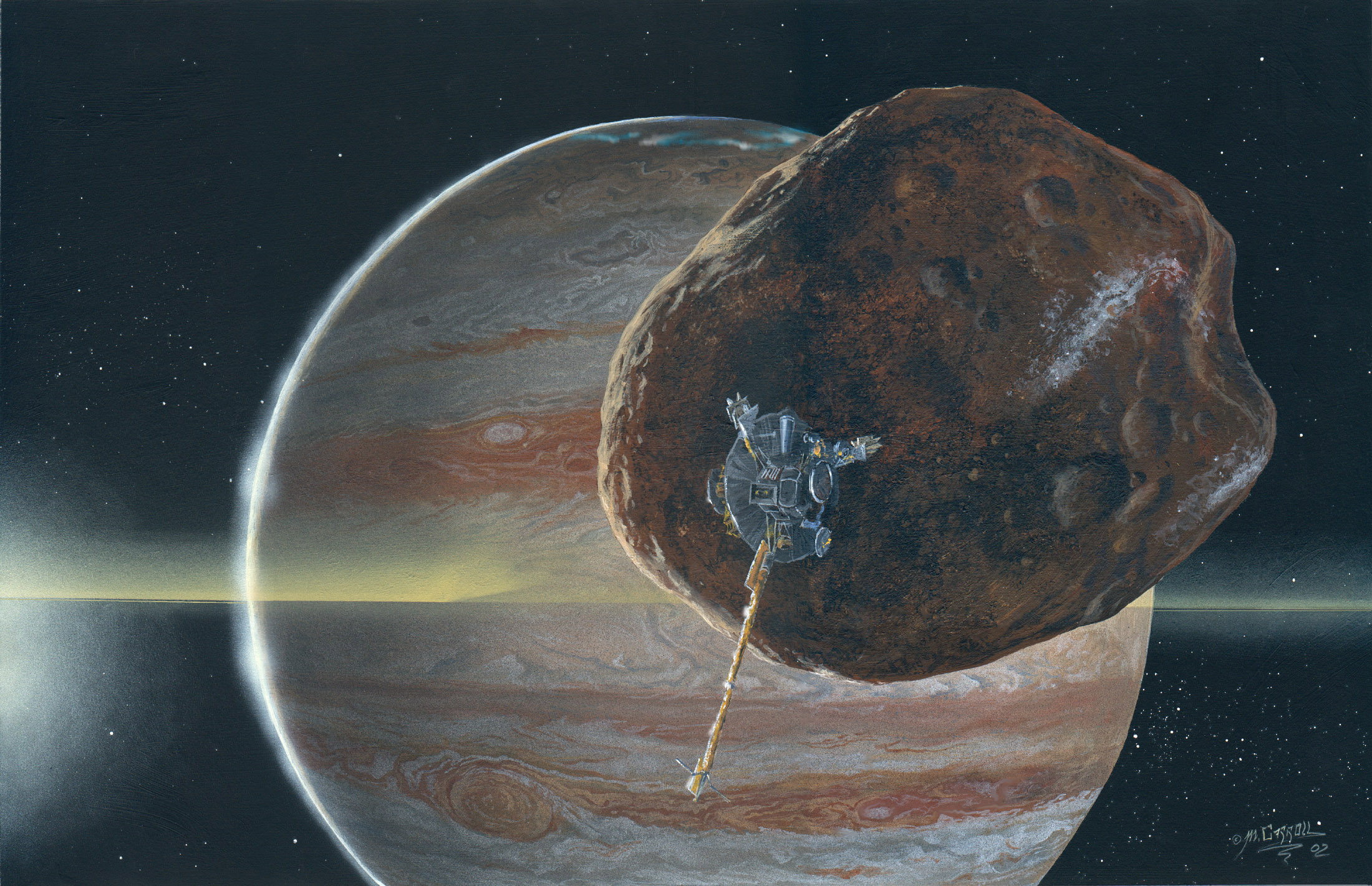
Artist's concept of Galileo passing near Jupiter's small inner moon Amalthea

Although Galileo's main mission was to explore the Galilean moons, it also captured images of four of the inner moons, Thebe, Adrastea, Amalthea, and Metis. Such images were only possible from a spacecraft; to Earth-based telescopes they were merely specks of light. Two years of Jupiter's intense radiation took its toll on the spacecraft's systems, and its fuel supply was running low in the early 2000s. Galileo's cameras were deactivated on January 17, 2002, after they had sustained irreparable radiation damage.

NASA engineers were able to recover the damaged tape-recorder electronics, and Galileo continued to return scientific data until it was deorbited in 2003, performing one last scientific experiment: a measurement of Amalthea's mass as the spacecraft swung by it. This was tricky to arrange; to be useful, Galileo had to fly within 300 kilometers (190 mi) of Amalthea, but not so close as to crash into it. This was complicated by its irregular 146-by-262-kilometer (91 by 163 mi) potato-like shape. It was tidally locked, pointing its long axis towards Jupiter. A successful flyby meant knowing which direction the asteroid was pointed in relation to Galileo at all times.

Galileo flew by Amalthea on November 5, 2002, during its 34th orbit, allowing a measurement of the moon's mass as it passed within 160 km (99 mi) of its surface. The results startled the scientific team; they revealed that Amalthea had a mass of 2.08×10^{18} kilograms (4.59×10^{18} lb), and with a volume of 2.43×10^{6} cubic kilometers (5.8×10^{5} cu mi), it therefore had a density of 857 ± 99 kilograms per cubic meter, less than that of water.

A final discovery occurred during the last two orbits of the mission. When the spacecraft passed the orbit of Amalthea, the star scanner detected unexpected flashes of light that were reflections from seven to nine moonlets. None of the individual moonlets was reliably sighted twice, so no orbits were determined. It is believed that they were most likely debris ejected from Amalthea that formed a tenuous, and perhaps temporary, ring around Jupiter.

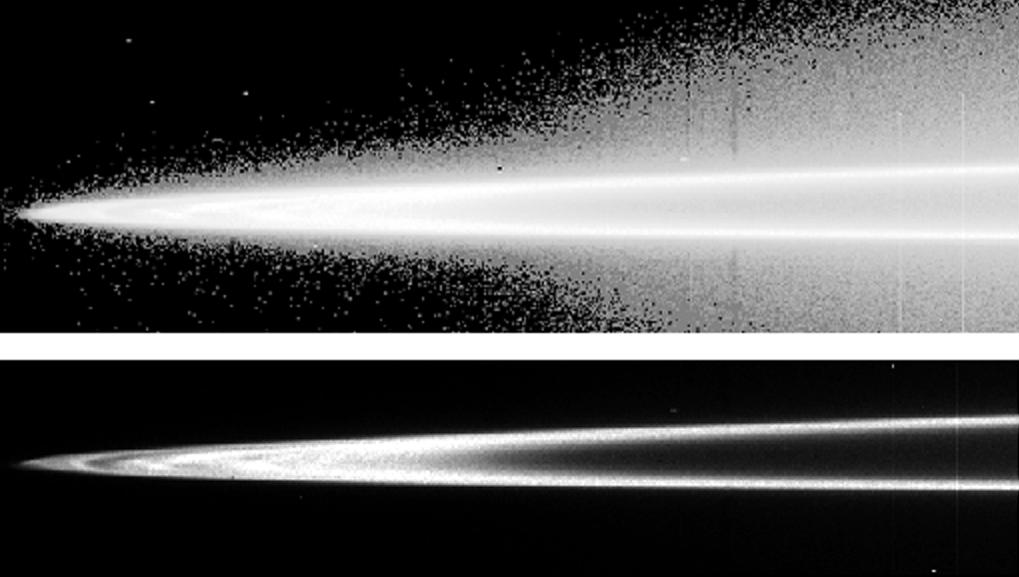
Jupiter's rings. Enhanced top image shows the halo of ring particles suspended by Jupiter's powerful electromagnetic field.

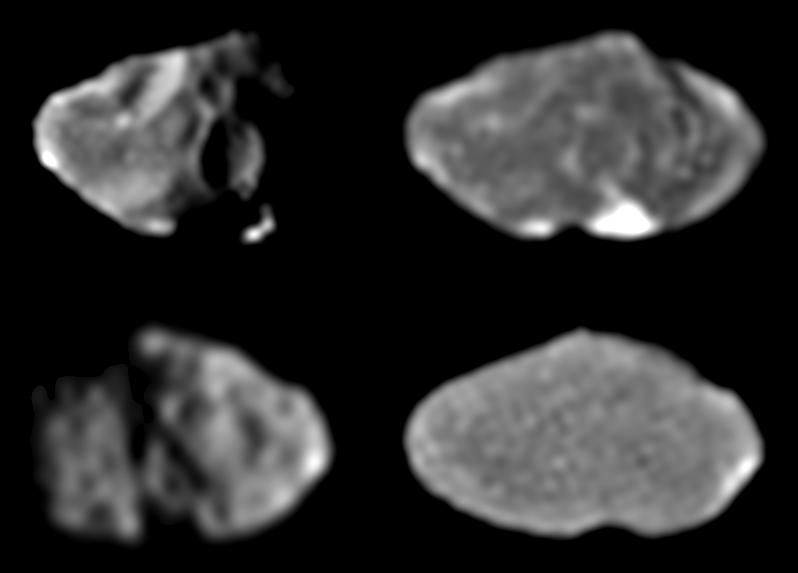
Inner moon Amalthea

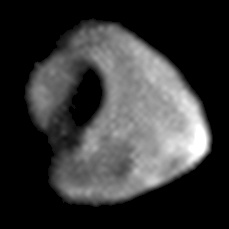
Inner moon Thebe

=== Star scanner ===
Galileo's star scanner was a small optical telescope that provided an absolute attitude reference, but it made several scientific discoveries serendipitously. In the prime mission, it was found that the star scanner was able to detect high-energy particles as a noise signal. This data was eventually calibrated to show the particles were predominantly >2 MeV (0.32 pJ) electrons that were trapped in the Jovian magnetic belts, and released to the Planetary Data System.

A second discovery occurred in 2000. The star scanner was observing a set of stars that included the second magnitude star Delta Velorum. At one point, this star dimmed for 8 hours below the star scanner's detection threshold. Subsequent analysis of Galileo data and work by amateur and professional astronomers showed that Delta Velorum is the brightest known eclipsing binary, brighter at maximum than Algol. It has a primary period of 45 days and the dimming is just visible with the naked eye.

=== Radiation-related anomalies ===
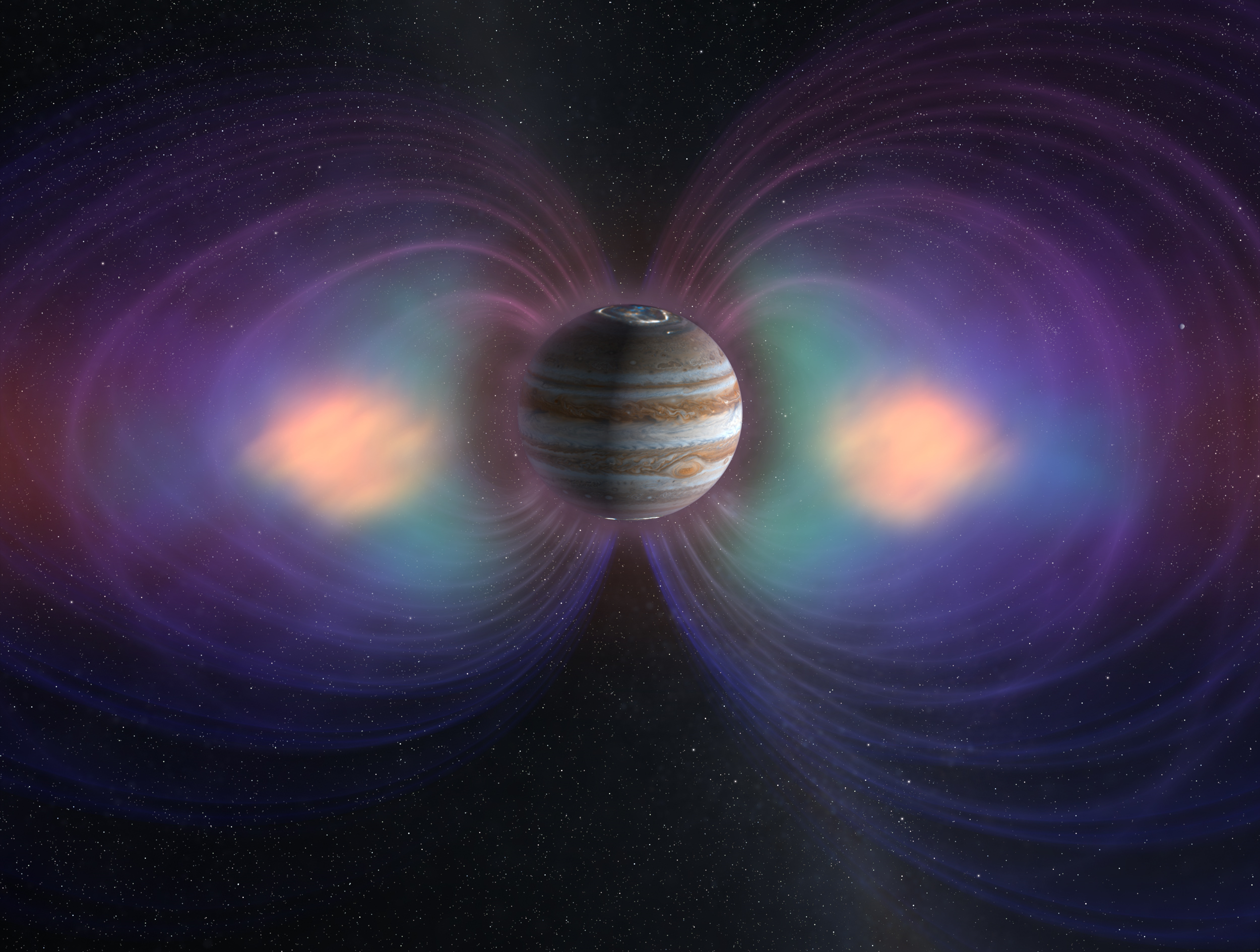
Artist's view of Jupiter's inner magnetosphere and radiation belts

Jupiter's uniquely harsh radiation environment caused over 20 anomalies over the course of Galileo's mission, in addition to the incidents expanded upon below. Despite having exceeded its radiation design limit by at least a factor of three, the spacecraft survived all these anomalies. Work-arounds were found eventually for all of these problems, and Galileo was never rendered entirely non-functional by Jupiter's radiation. The radiation limits for Galileo's computers were based on data returned from Pioneer 10 and Pioneer 11, since much of the design work was underway before the two Voyagers arrived at Jupiter in 1979.

A typical effect of the radiation was that several of the science instruments suffered increased noise while within about 700,000 km (430,000 mi) of Jupiter. The SSI camera began producing totally white images when the spacecraft was hit by the exceptional Bastille Day coronal mass ejection in 2000, and did so again on subsequent close approaches to Jupiter. The quartz crystal used as the frequency reference for the radio suffered permanent frequency shifts with each Jupiter approach. A spin detector failed, and the spacecraft gyro output was biased by the radiation environment.

The most severe effects of the radiation were current leakages somewhere in the spacecraft's power bus, most likely across brushes at a spin bearing connecting rotor and stator sections of the orbiter. These current leakages triggered a reset of the onboard computer and caused it to go into safe mode. The resets occurred when the spacecraft was either close to Jupiter or in the region of space magnetically downstream of Jupiter. A change to the software was made in April 1999 that allowed the onboard computer to detect these resets and autonomously recover, so as to avoid safe mode.

=== Tape recorder problems ===
Routine maintenance of the tape recorder involved winding the tape halfway down its length and back again to prevent it sticking. In November 2002, after the completion of the mission's only encounter with Jupiter's moon Amalthea, problems with playback of the tape recorder again plagued Galileo. About 10 minutes after the closest approach of the Amalthea flyby, Galileo stopped collecting data, shut down all of its instruments, and went into safe mode, apparently as a result of exposure to Jupiter's intense radiation environment. Though most of the Amalthea data was already written to tape, it was found that the recorder refused to respond to commands telling it to play back data.

After weeks of troubleshooting of an identical flight spare of the recorder on the ground, it was determined that the cause of the malfunction was a reduction of light output in three infrared Optek OP133 light-emitting diodes (LEDs) located in the drive electronics of the recorder's motor encoder wheel. The gallium arsenide LEDs had been particularly sensitive to proton-irradiation-induced atomic lattice displacement defects, which greatly decreased their effective light output and caused the drive motor's electronics to falsely believe the motor encoder wheel was incorrectly positioned.

Galileo's flight team then began a series of "annealing" sessions, where current was passed through the LEDs for hours at a time to heat them to a point where some of the crystalline lattice defects would be shifted back into place, thus increasing the LED's light output. After about 100 hours of annealing and playback cycles, the recorder was able to operate for up to an hour at a time. After many subsequent playback and cooling cycles, the complete transmission back to Earth of all recorded Amalthea flyby data was successful.

=== End of mission and deorbit ===
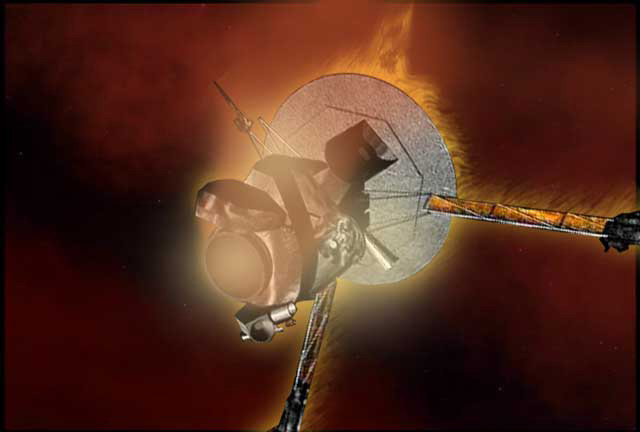
Illustration of Galileo entering Jupiter's atmosphere

When the exploration of Mars was being considered in the early 1960s, Carl Sagan and Sidney Coleman produced a paper concerning contamination of the red planet. In order that scientists could determine whether native life forms existed before the planet became contaminated by micro-organisms from Earth, they proposed that space missions should aim at a 99.9 percent chance that contamination should not occur. This figure was adopted by the Committee on Space Research (COSPAR) of the International Council of Scientific Unions in 1964, and was subsequently applied to all planetary probes.

The danger was highlighted in 1969 when the Apollo 12 astronauts returned components of the Surveyor 3 spacecraft that had landed on the Moon three years before, and it was found that microbes were still viable even after three years in that harsh climate. An alternative was the Prime Directive, a philosophy of non-interference with alien life forms enunciated by the original Star Trek television series that prioritized the interests of the life forms over those of scientists. Given the (admittedly slim) prospect of life on Europa, scientists Richard Greenberg and Randall Tufts proposed that a new standard be set of no greater chance of contamination than that which might occur naturally by meteorites.

Galileo had not been sterilized prior to launch and could conceivably have carried bacteria from Earth. Therefore, a plan was formulated to send the probe directly into Jupiter, in an intentional crash to eliminate the possibility of an impact with Jupiter's moons, particularly Europa, and prevent a forward contamination. On April 14, 2003, the Galileo orbiter reached its greatest orbital distance from Jupiter for the entire mission since orbital insertion, 26 million km (16 million mi), before plunging back towards the gas giant for its final impact. At the completion of J35, its final orbit around the Jovian system, Galileo struck Jupiter in darkness just south of the equator on September 21, 2003, at 18:57 UTC. Its impact speed was approximately 48 km/s (30 mi/s).

=== Major findings ===
1. The composition of Jupiter differs from that of the Sun, indicating that Jupiter has evolved since the formation of the Solar System.
2. Galileo made the first observation of ammonia clouds in another planet's atmosphere. The atmosphere creates ammonia ice particles from material coming up from lower depths.
3. Io was confirmed to have extensive volcanic activity that is 100 times greater than that found on Earth. The heat and frequency of eruptions are reminiscent of early Earth.
4. Complex plasma interactions in Io's atmosphere create immense electrical currents which couple to Jupiter's atmosphere.
5. Several lines of evidence from Galileo support the theory that liquid oceans exist under Europa's icy surface.
6. Ganymede possesses its own, substantial magnetic field – the first satellite known to have one.
7. Galileo magnetic data provided evidence that Europa, Ganymede and Callisto have a liquid salt water layer under the visible surface.
8. Evidence exists that Europa, Ganymede, and Callisto all have a thin atmospheric layer known as a "surface-bound exosphere".
9. Jupiter's ring system is formed by dust kicked up as interplanetary meteoroids smash into the planet's four small inner moons. The outermost ring is actually two rings, one embedded with the other. There is probably a separate ring along Amalthea's orbit as well.
10. The Galileo spacecraft identified the global structure and dynamics of a giant planet's magnetosphere.

== Follow-on missions ==
There was a spare Galileo spacecraft that was considered by the NASA–ESA Outer Planets Study Team in 1983 for a mission to Saturn, but it was passed over in favor of a newer design, which became Cassini–Huygens. While Galileo was operating, Ulysses passed by Jupiter in 1992 on its mission to study the Sun's polar regions, and Cassini–Huygens coasted by the planet in 2000 and 2001 en route to Saturn. New Horizons passed close by Jupiter in 2007 for a gravity assist en route to Pluto, and it too collected data on the planet.

=== Juno ===
The next mission to orbit Jupiter was NASA's Juno spacecraft, which was launched on August 5, 2011, and entered Jovian orbit on July 4, 2016. Although intended for a two-year mission, it is still active in 2024 and expected to continue until September 2025. Juno provided the first views of Jupiter's north pole and new insights into Jupiter's aurorae, magnetic field, and atmosphere. Information gathered about Jovian lightning prompted revision of earlier theories, and analysis of the frequency of interplanetary dust impacts (primarily on the backs of the solar panels), as Juno passed between Earth and the asteroid belt, indicated that this dust comes from Mars, rather than from comets or asteroids, as was previously thought.

=== Jupiter Icy Moons Explorer ===
The European Space Agency is planning to return to the Jovian system with the Jupiter Icy Moons Explorer (JUICE). This was launched from Europe's Spaceport in French Guiana on April 14, 2023, and is expected to reach Jupiter in July 2031.

=== Europa Clipper ===
Even before Galileo concluded, NASA considered the Europa Orbiter, but it was canceled in 2002. A lower-cost version was then studied, which led to Europa Clipper being approved in 2015. This mission launched from Kennedy Space Center on October 14, 2024 and is expected to reach Jupiter in April 2030.

=== Europa Lander ===
A lander, simply called Europa Lander was assessed by the Jet Propulsion Laboratory. As of 2024, this mission remains a concept, although some funds were released for instrument development and maturation.
