= List of quadrangles on Io =

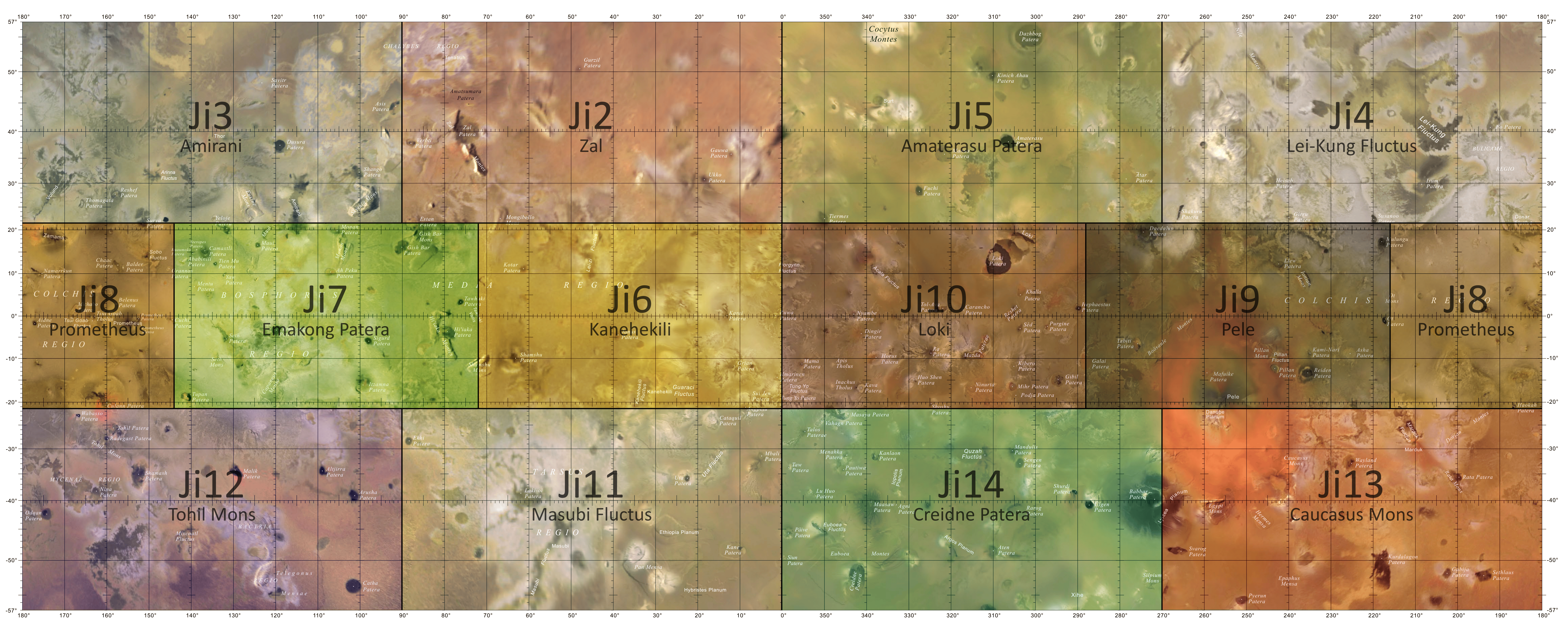
A Mercator projection of the arrangement of the quadrangles on Io, except at the poles

Io has been divided into 15 quadrangles.

Name	Number	Latitude range	Longitude range	Features	Ref
Chors Patera	Ji1	65.5°–90° N	0°-360° W		
Zal	Ji2	21.5°–65.5° N	0°–90° W		
Amirani	Ji3	21.5°–65.5° N	90°–180° W	Thomagata Patera	
Lei-Kung Fluctus	Ji4	21.5°–65.5° N	180°–270° W		
Amaterasu Patera	Ji5	21.5°–65.5° N	270°–360° W	Fuchi Patera, Kinich Ahau Patera, Manua Patera, Dazhbog Patera, Surt	
Kanehekili	Ji6	21.5° N – 21.5° S	0°–72° W		
Emakong Patera	Ji7	21.5° N – 21.5° S	72°–144° W	Chaac-Camaxtli region, Monan Patera, Tawhaki Vallis, Ah Peku Patera, Gish Bar Patera, Maui Patera, Tawhaki Patera, Tupan Patera	
Prometheus	Ji8	21.5° N – 21.5° S	144°–216° W	Chaac-Camaxtli region,	
Pele	Ji9	21.5°N – 21.5° S	216°–288° W	Asha Patera, Kami-Nari Patera, Reiden Patera, Pillan Patera	
Loki	Ji10	21.5° N – 21.5° S	288°–360° W	Ra Patera	
Masubi Fluctus	Ji11	21.5°–65.5° S	0°–90° W		
Tohil Mons	Ji12	21.5°–65.5° S	90°–180° W		
Caucasus Mons	Ji13	21.5°–65.5° S	180–270° W	Mithra Patera, Pyerun Patera, Svarog Patera, Egypt Mons, Danube Planum	
Creidne Patera	Ji14	21.5°–65.5° S	270–360° W	Babbar Patera, Viracocha Patera, Euboea Montes, Silpium Mons, Kanlaon Patera	
Haemus Montes	Ji15	65.5°–90° S	0°-360° W		
