= List of geological features on Io =

This is a list of named geological features on Io, a moon of Jupiter. See also the list of mountains on Io and the list of paterae on Io.

== Eruptive Centers ==
Eruptive centers on Io, locations typically where major volcanic activity was observed and characterized before the volcanic landform was, are named after the gods of volcanoes, lightning, and/or blacksmiths in various mythologies.

| Volcano | Named after |
|---|---|
| Amirani | Amirani (Georgian) |
| Kanehekili | Kanehekili (Hawaiian) |
| Loki | Loki (Norse) |
| Marduk | Marduk (Babylonian) |
| Masubi | Ho-Masubi (Japanese) |
| Maui | Māui (Hawaiian) |
| Pele | Pele (Hawaiian) |
| Prometheus | Prometheus (Greek) |
| Surt | Surtur (Icelandic) |
| Thor | Thor (Norse) |
| Volund | Volund (Norse) |
| Zamama | Zamama (Babylonian) |

== Catenae ==
On Io, catenae /kəˈtiːnə/ (crater chains, sg. catena) are named after sun gods in various mythologies. In 2006, the use of the term catena was discontinued in favor of the patera /ˈpætərə/ (plural paterae /ˈpætəriː/). Below is a list of features that previously used the descriptor term catena.

| Catena | Named after |
|---|---|
| Mazda Paterae | Ahura Mazda (Zoroastrian) |
| Reshet Patera | Reshet (Aramaic) |
| Tvashtar Paterae | Tvashtri (Hindu) |

== Fluctūs ==
Ionian fluctus /ˈflʌktəs/ (areas of lava flow) are named after fire and thunder gods in various mythologies, or after locations in Greek mythology associated with Io.

| Fluctus | Named after |
|---|---|
| Acala Fluctus | Acala (Buddhism) |
| Arinna Fluctus | Arinna (Hittite) |
| Donar Fluctus | Donar (Germanic) |
| Euboea Fluctūs | Euboea (Greek) |
| Fjorgynn Fluctus | Fjorgyn (Norse) |
| Kanehekili Fluctus | Kanehekili (Hawaiian) |
| Lei-Kung Fluctus | Lei Gong (Chinese) |
| Lei-zi Fluctus | Lei Zi (Chinese) |
| Marduk Fluctus | Marduk (Sumerian) |
| Masubi Fluctus | Ho-Masubi (Japanese) |
| Sobo Fluctus | Sobo (Vodou) |
| Tsui Fluctus | Tsui (Khoikhoi) |
| Tung Yo Fluctus | Tung Yo (Chinese) |
| Uta Fluctus | Uta (Sumerian) |

== Mensae ==
Ionian mensae /ˈmɛnsiː/ (mesas, sg. mensa) are named after mythological figures associated with fire or with the nymph Io.

| Mensa | Named after |
|---|---|
| Capaneus Mensa | Capaneus (The Divine Comedy) |
| Echo Mensa | Echo (Greek) |
| Epaphus Mensa | Epaphus (Greek) |
| Hermes Mensa | Hermes (Greek) |
| Iynx Mensa | Iynx (Greek) |
| Pan Mensa | Pan (Greek) |
| Prometheus Mensa | Prometheus (Greek) |
| Telegonus Mensae | Telegonus, husband of Io (Greek) |
| Tvashtar Mensae | Tvashtar (Hindu) |

== Montes ==
Ionian montes /ˈmɒntiːz/ (mountains and volcanos, sg. mons /ˈmɒnz/) are named after people and places associated with the nymph Io, and sun and fire gods in various other mythologies.

== Paterae ==
Ionian paterae /ˈpætəriː/ (shallow craters and crater chains) are named after sun gods and fire gods in various mythologies.

== Plana ==
Ionian plana /ˈpleɪnə/ (plateaus, sg. planum /ˈpleɪnəm/) are named after locations in Greek mythology associated with the nymph Io.

| Planum | Named after |
|---|---|
| Argos Planum | Argos |
| Danube Planum | Danube River |
| Dodona Planum | Dodona |
| Ethiopia Planum | Ethiopia |
| Hybristes Planum | Hybristes |
| Iopolis Planum | Iopolis |
| Lyrcea Planum | Lyrcea |
| Nemea Planum | Nemea |

== Regiones ==
Ionian regiones /rɛdʒiˈoʊniːz/ (regions, sg. regio /ˈriːdʒioʊ/) are mostly named after locations in Greek mythology associated with the nymph Io.

| Regio | Named after |
|---|---|
| Bactria Regio | Bactria |
| Bosphorus Regio | Bosphorus |
| Bulicame Regio | Bulicame (The Divine Comedy) |
| Chalybes Regio | Chalybes |
| Colchis Regio | Colchis |
| Illyrikon Regio | Illyria |
| Lerna Regio | Lerna |
| Media Regio | Media |
| Mycenae Regio | Mycenae |
| Tarsus Regio | Tarsus |

== Tholi ==
Ionian tholi /ˈθoʊlaɪ/ (hills, sg. tholus /ˈθoʊləs/) are named after mythological figures associated with fire or with the nymph Io.

| Tholus | Named after | Coordinates |
|---|---|---|
| Apis Tholus | Apis (Greek) | 10.9°S 347.88°W |
| Inachus Tholus | Inachus (Greek) | 16.18°S 347.76°W |
| Tsui Goab Tholus | Tsui (Khoikhoi) | 0.1°S 163.0°W |
