= Thomagata Patera =

Patera on Io

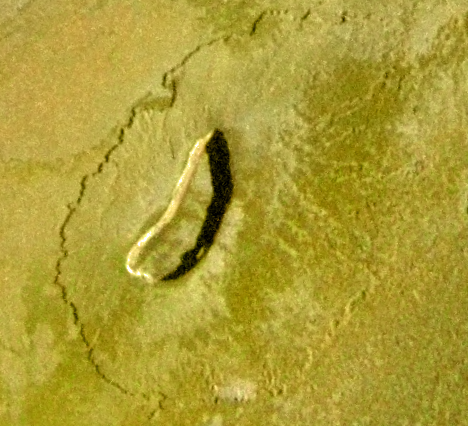
Highest resolution image of Thomagata Patera, taken by the Galileo spacecraft in October 2001 with color from July 1999

Thomagata Patera is a volcano on Jupiter's moon Io. It is located on Io's anti-Jupiter hemisphere at 25.67°N 165.94°W, to the east of the nearby active volcanoes Volund and Zamama. Thomagata is a kidney-shaped Ionian patera, a type of volcanic crater similar to a caldera, 56 kilometers (35 mi) long, 26 km (16 mi) wide, and 1.2–1.6 km (0.7–1.0 mi) deep. The volcano is currently inactive as a thermal hotspot has never been observed at Thomagata and the bright floor of the patera suggests that it is cold enough for sulfur dioxide and sulfur to condense. Thomagata is located near the center of a low, 100 km (62 mi) wide mesa. The edge of the mesa rises 200 meters (660 ft) above the surrounding plains, however the slope up to the edge of Thomagata Patera is unknown. If the floor of the patera is at the same level as the surrounding plains, the western slope of the mesa would have a grade of 2°. The morphology of this mesa and the pattern of faded lava flows along its slopes radiating away from Thomagata (at least on its eastern side) suggest that Thomagata Patera and the mesa that surrounds it may be a shield volcano, also called a tholus on Io. The irregular margin of the mesa and the lack of debris at the base of its basal scarp suggest that it was modified by sulfur dioxide sapping.

== Etymology ==
Following detailed observations of the volcano by the Galileo spacecraft in October 2001, Thomagata Patera was named in 2006 by the International Astronomical Union (IAU) after the mythical cacique of the Muisca, Thomagata. According to the IAU, the mythical Thomagata was "a terrifying fire spirit who flew through the air changing men into animals."
