= Kanlaon Patera =

Volcanic depression on Jupiter's moon Io

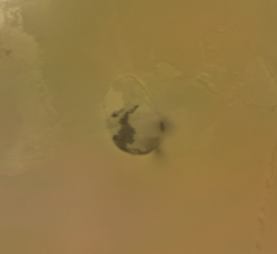
- A Mercator projection image of Kanlaon Patera.
- Feature type: Patera, Volcanic Caldera
- Coordinates: 31°04′S 337°58′W
- Diameter: 94 kilometres (58 mi)
- Eponym: Kan-Laon

Kanlaon Patera is an active volcano on Io, the most volcanically active body in the Solar System, and the third largest moon of the planet Jupiter. Kanlaon Patera is approximately 94 km (58 mi) in diameter. It is a ground-level volcano and does not possess a cone — unlike most volcanoes on Earth, which usually have distinctive cones or shields.

== Naming ==
Kanlaon Patera is named after the goddess Kan-Laon (also known as Laon or Lalahon), the supreme deity of creation, agriculture, the sky and divine justice from the pre-colonial, animistic Visayan mythology from the Philippines.

The International Astronomical Union (IAU), the organization responsible for formally naming celestial objects and their surface features, selected the name in accordance with the theme that volcanoes on Io should be named after gods and goddesses who are associated with fire, volcanoes, the Sun, lightning and blacksmithing. During pre-colonial times, the Visayan people believed that the goddess Kan-Laon resided on the top of the volcano Mount Kanlaon on the island of Negros in the Philippines.

The name for Kanlaon Patera was approved by the IAU in April 2023.

== Location ==
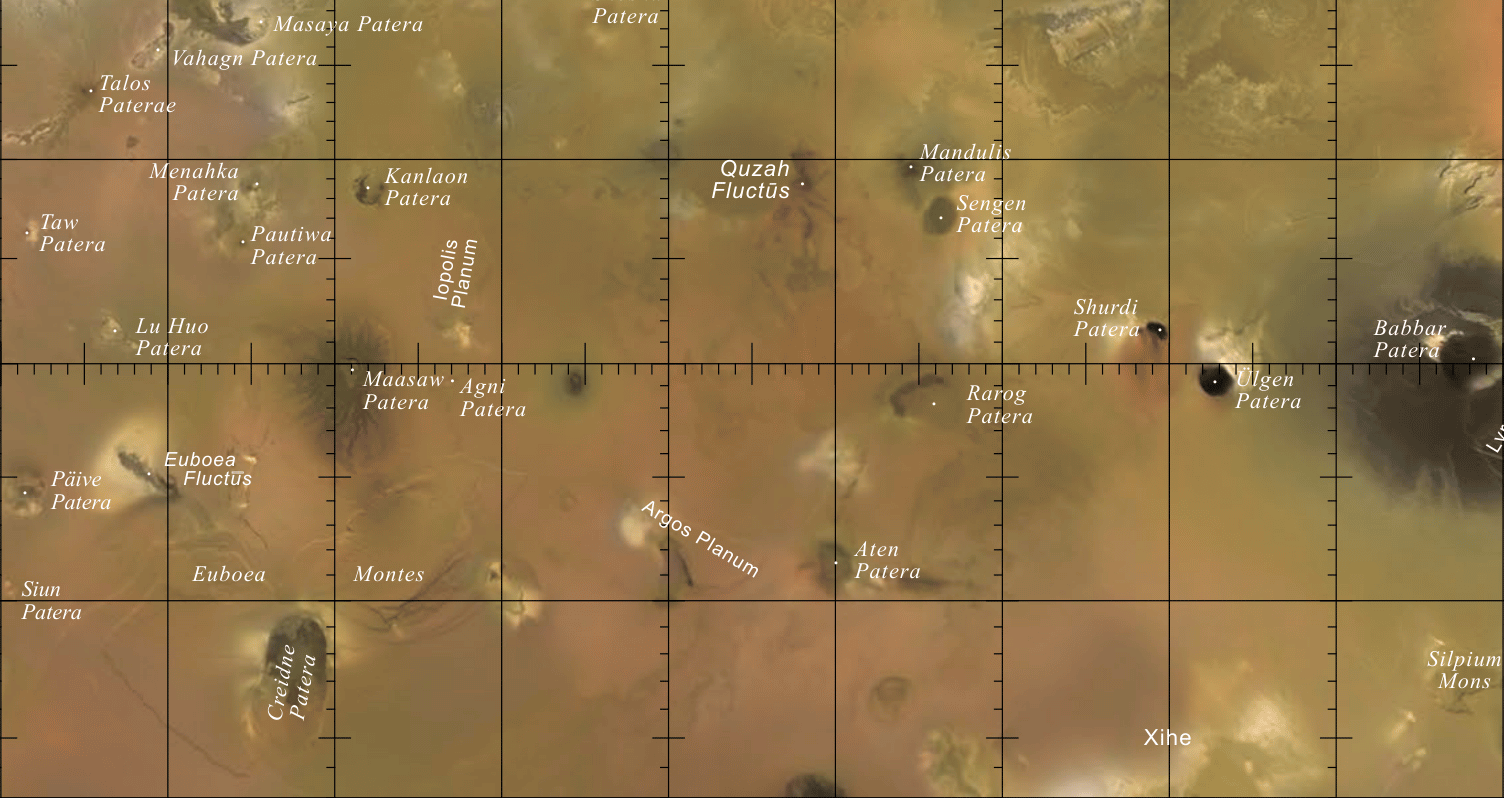
A map of the Creidne Patera quadrangle. Kanlaon Patera is situated in the upper-left corner of the map

Kanlaon Patera is located in the southern hemisphere of Io, within the Creidne Patera quadrangle (designated Ji14) of Io.

It is surrounded by a multitude of other volcanoes and other paterae like itself. To Kanlaon Patera's west lie a pair of paterae, Menahka Patera and Pautiwa Patera, while to the north is Masaya Patera. To the southeast, a volcanic plain called Iopolis Planum is located.

Because Io rotates around Jupiter while simultaneously rotating on its own axis, one hemisphere of the moon always faces its primary planet, while the opposite side never does. Kanlaon Patera is located on the side of Io that always faces Jupiter. Therefore, an observer standing at Kanlaon Patera would always see Jupiter in the sky. (Note: For moons in synchronous rotation, such as Io, 0° longitude corresponds to the part of the surface that always faces Jupiter. Regions between 90° W to 0° to 270° W longitude always face the moon’s parent planet.)

== Geology ==
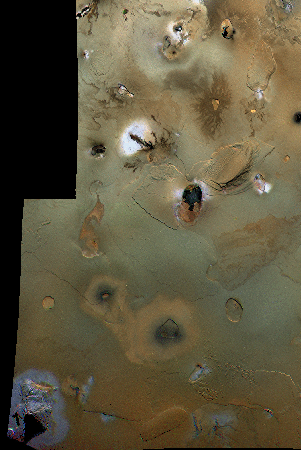
A mosaic image of the region around Creidne Patera. Kanalon Patera is the small horseshoe-shaped black mark on the uppermost part of the image, slightly to the right.

Kanlaon Patera is an active volcano on Io. It is a horseshoe-shaped caldera and it is a ground level volcano, similar to Taal Volcano on Earth. Like many other paterae on Io, when Kanlaon Patera is not erupting, its surface is covered with dark material from solidified lava, which makes it appear dark when viewed from space.

The western part of Kanlaon Patera is dark, but its central and eastern parts are not covered by dark material. Because volcanoes on Io erupt frequently, the appearance of Kanlaon Patera is expected to change within just a few years.

== Exploration ==
Kanlaon Patera was visited and photographed by two spacecraft: Voyager 1 and Galileo.

Voyager 1 was the first spacecraft to capture clear images of Io during its brief flyby of Jupiter and its moons in March 1979. It was also the first spacecraft to discover clear evidence that Io is a world with active volcanism, and it photographed the Creidne Patera quadrangle.

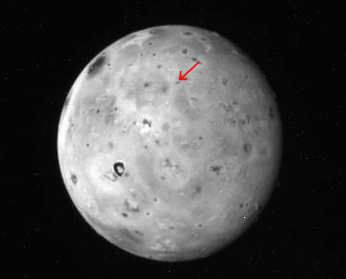
An image of Io, showing Kanlaon Patera with a red arrow. This image was taken by Galileo in August 1999.

As of 2026, Galileo was the most recent spacecraft to capture images of Kanlaon Patera. During its orbit around Jupiter from December 1995 to September 2003, it obtained both distant, low-resolution images and medium-resolution images of Kanlaon Patera during several of its flybys.

== See also ==
- Volcanism on Io
- List of volcanic features on Io
