= Crater chain =

Line of craters along the surface of an astronomical body

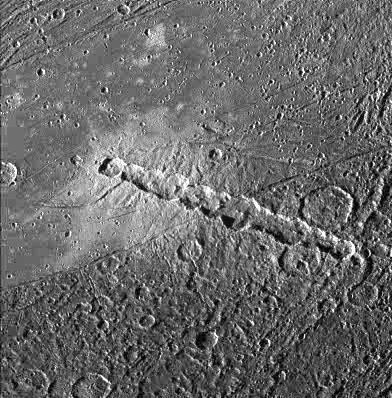
Enki Catena is a chain of impact craters on Ganymede, caused by a fragmented space body (probably a comet). The picture covers an area about 193 kilometers (120 mi) wide.

A crater chain is a line of craters along the surface of an astronomical body. The descriptor term for crater chains is catena /kəˈtiːnə/, plural catenae /kəˈtiːniː/ (Latin for "chain"), as specified by the International Astronomical Union's rules on planetary nomenclature.

Many examples of such chains are thought to have been formed by the impact of a body that was broken up by tidal forces into a string of smaller objects following roughly the same orbit. An example of such a tidally disrupted body that was observed prior to its impact on Jupiter is Comet Shoemaker-Levy 9. During the Voyager observations of the Jupiter system, planetary scientists identified 13 crater chains on Callisto and three on Ganymede (except those formed by secondary craters). Later some of these chains turned out to be secondary or tectonic features, but some other chains were discovered. As of 1996, eight primary chains on Callisto and three on Ganymede were confirmed.

However, other crater chains, such as many of those on Mars, represent chains of collapse pits associated with grabens (see, for example, the Tithoniae Catenae near Tithonium Chasma). Crater chains may also be formed by a sequence of explosive cryovolcanic eruptions, such as Set Catena on Neptune's moon Triton.

Crater chains seen on the Moon often radiate from larger craters, and in such cases are thought to be either caused by secondary impacts of the larger crater's ejecta or by volcanic venting activity along a rift.

== See also ==
- Moon
  - List of catenae on the Moon
- Mars
  - List of catenae on Mars
- Ceres
  - List of catenae on Ceres
- Jupiter
  - List of catenae on Callisto
  - List of catenae on Ganymede
  - List of catenae on Io
- Saturn
  - List of catenae on Rhea
  - List of catenae on Dione
- Neptune
  - List of catenae on Triton
