= Kanehekili Fluctus =

Lava flow on Io

Kanehekili
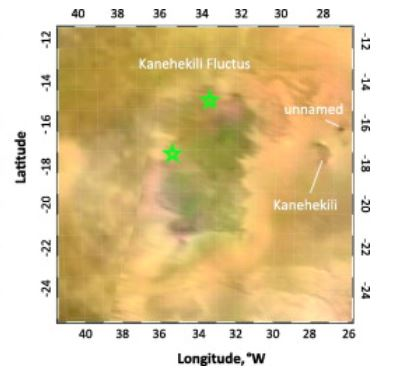
- This image is clipped from the USGS Io Global Mosaic (Becker and Geissler, 2005). Green stars denote the position of hot spots (> 700 K) detected by Galileo SSI.

Highest point
- Coordinates: 17.68°S 33.56°W

Geology
- Mountain type: Fluctus

Kanehekili Fluctus is a lava flow field on Jupiter's moon, Io. This fluctus (terrain covered by outflow of liquid, used on Venus, Io and Titan) is located in the sub-Jovian hemisphere at 17.68°S 33.56°W as shown in the picture on the right. Also in the picture is the Kanehekili volcanic center located at 18.21°S 33.6°W. This lava field covers roughly 34,500 square kilometres (13,300 mi^{2}). The hotspot was detected by the Galileo Solid State Imaging experiment (SSI) on orbits by Galileo.

The Kanehekili and Janus Patera region are of interest because there are indications that it contains an active, overturning lava lake. Based on thermal emission data, this area is almost identical to the Pele region which is believed to be the site of an active, overturning lava lake. These two regions are the only sites where thermal emissions are identical to terrestrial active, overturning lava lakes, and this feature makes it a high priority target for a future space craft mission.

Ionian flucti are areas of lava flow. They are named after fire and thunder gods of various mythologies or after locations in Greek mythology associated with Io. Kanehekili Fluctus is possibly a silicate lava flow. The darkest and youngest area of the fluctus is about 16,500 square kilometres (6,400 mi^{2}). Observation of thermal emission leads to the inference that Kanehekili Fluctus is subject to episodic volcanism that has periods of explosive activity followed by less active periods of time. It is possible that detection of the cooled flows may become more difficult as time goes on.

== See also ==
- Volcanism on Io
- List of volcanic features on Io
- Lava flows in the Mylitta Fluctus region
