= Danube Planum =

Plateau on Io

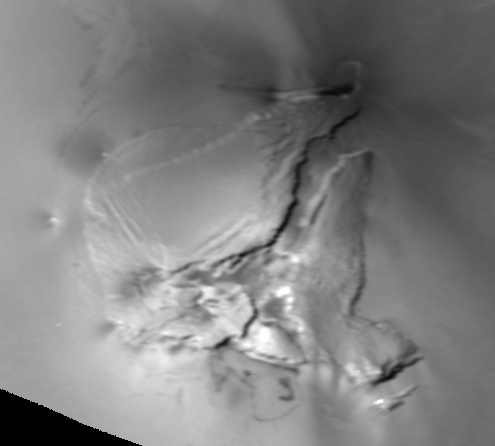
Danube Planum as seen by Voyager 1 in March 1979

Danube Planum is a rifted mesa on the surface of Jupiter's moon Io. It is located on Io's trailing hemisphere at 22.73°S 257.44°W. Danube Planum is 244.22 kilometers across and 5.5 km tall. The mountain is bisected by a 15-to-25-kilometer-wide, northeast–southwest-trending canyon, splitting the mountain into two main east and west mountains, with several additional blocks at the southern end of the fracture. The outer margin of the plateau is marked by 2.6-to-3.4-km-tall scarps. Mass wasting in the form of landslide deposits are visible along the base of the western half of Danube Planum. Two volcanic depressions, known as paterae, lie at northern and southern ends of mountain. The volcano at the northern end, Pele, is one of the most active volcanoes on Io. One of the faults that helped form Danube Planum may also act as a conduit for magma to rise to the surface at Pele.

In 1985, the International Astronomical Union officially named the mountain after the Danube River, one of a number of places the mythological Io passed during her wanderings.
