= Volcanism on Io =

Volcanism of Io, a moon of Jupiter

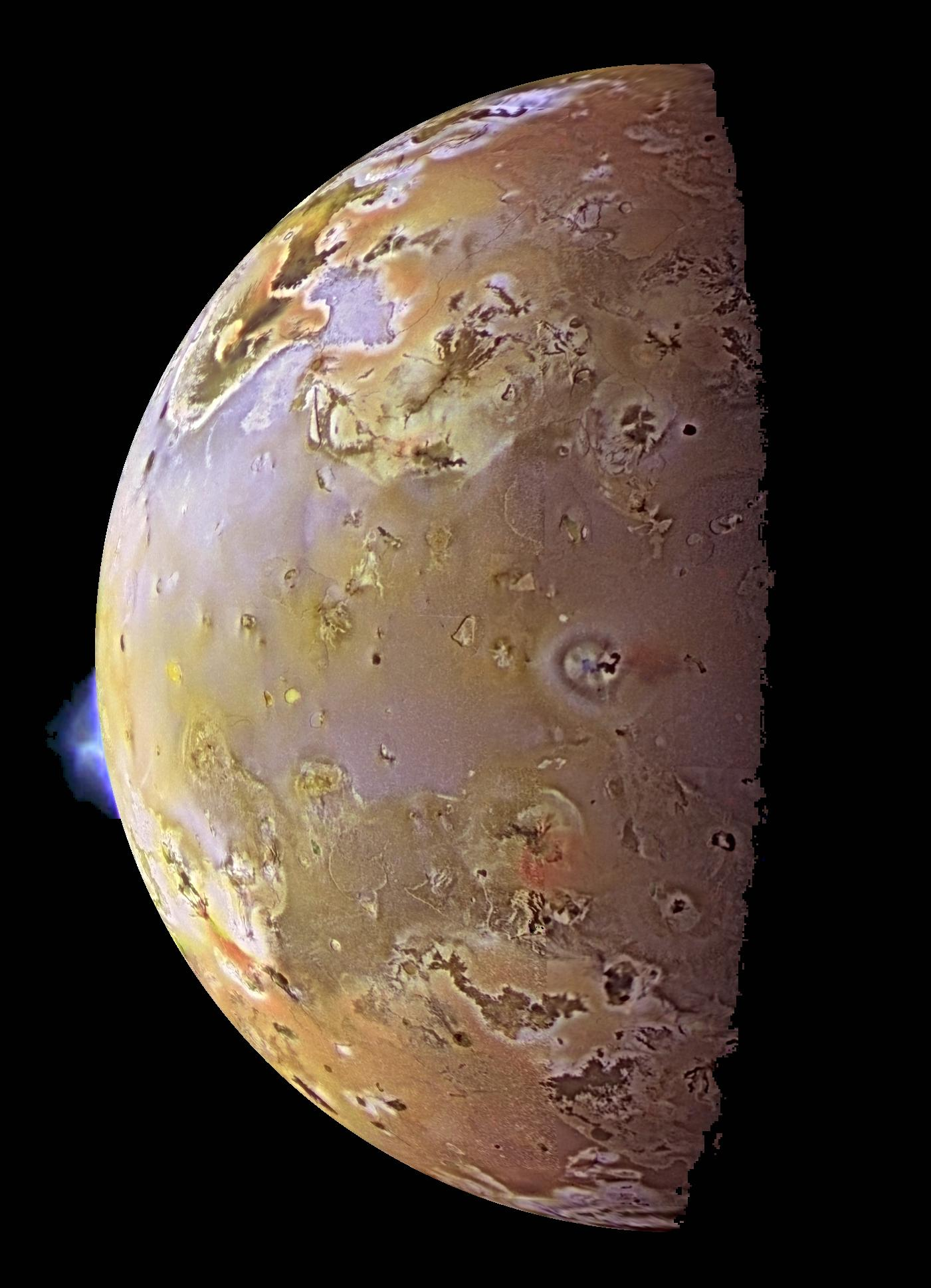
Io, with two plumes erupting from its surface, Galileo image, June 1997

Io, a moon of Jupiter, has a substantial presence of volcanoes, volcanic pits and lava flows on its surface. Volcanic activity on the moon was first discovered in 1979 by Linda Morabito, an imaging scientist working on Voyager 1. Observations of Io by passing spacecraft and Earth-based astronomers have revealed more than 150 active volcanoes. As of 2024, up to 400 such volcanoes are predicted to exist based on these observations. Io's volcanism makes the satellite one of only five worlds in the Solar System confirmed to be currently volcanically or cryovolcanically active (the others being Earth, Venus, Saturn's moon Enceladus, and Neptune's moon Triton; though there are others suspected to also be active).

First predicted shortly before the Voyager 1 flyby, the heat source for Io's volcanism comes from tidal heating produced by its forced orbital eccentricity. This differs from Earth's internal heating, which is derived primarily from radioactive isotope decay and primordial heat of accretion. Io's eccentric orbit leads to a slight difference in Jupiter's gravitational pull on the satellite between its closest and farthest points on its orbit, causing a varying tidal bulge. This variation in the shape of Io causes frictional heating in its interior. Without this tidal heating, Io might have been similar to the Moon, a world of similar size and mass, geologically dead and covered with numerous impact craters.

Io's volcanism has led to the formation of hundreds of volcanic centres and extensive lava formations, making it the most volcanically active body in the Solar System. Three different types of volcanic eruptions have been identified, differing in duration, intensity, lava effusion rate, and whether the eruption occurs within a volcanic pit (known as a patera). Lava flows on Io, tens or hundreds of kilometres long, have primarily basaltic composition, similar to lavas seen on Earth at shield volcanoes such as Kīlauea in Hawaii. Although most of the lava on Io is made of basalt, a few lava flows consisting of sulfur and sulfur dioxide have been seen. In addition, eruption temperatures as high as 1,600 K (1,300 °C; 2,400 °F) were detected, which can be explained by the eruption of high-temperature ultramafic silicate lavas.

As a result of the presence of significant quantities of sulfurous materials in Io's crust and on its surface, some eruptions propel sulfur, sulfur dioxide gas, and pyroclastic material up to 500 kilometres (310 mi) into space, producing large, umbrella-shaped volcanic plumes. This material paints the surrounding terrain in red, black, and/or white, and provides material for Io's patchy atmosphere and Jupiter's extensive magnetosphere. Spacecraft that have flown by Io since 1979 have observed numerous surface changes as a result of Io's volcanic activity.

Further observations by the Juno orbiter of volcanism and volcanic plumes on Io were made during a 3 February 2024 flyby. Close flybys of Io during Juno orbits 57 and 58 (30 December 2023 and 3 February 2024), at distances of approximately 3,500–4,500 km, allowed the JIRAM infrared instrument to map Loki Patera at pixel scales as small as 400 m. These observations revealed a single counterclockwise resurfacing wave propagating at 2–3 km per day, a time-averaged thermal output of ~10 TW, and at least 20 small islands (~3 km wide) anchored to the lake floor that have remained in fixed positions since Voyager 1's flyby in 1979.

== Discovery ==
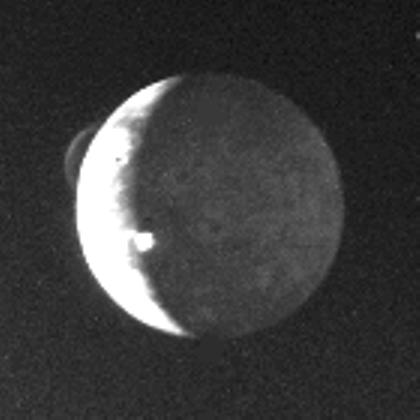
Discovery image of active volcanism on Io. The plumes of Pele and Loki are visible above the limb and at the terminator, respectively.

Before the Voyager 1 encounter with Io on March 5, 1979, Io was thought to be a dead world much like the Moon. The discovery of a cloud of sodium surrounding Io led to theories that the satellite would be covered in evaporites.

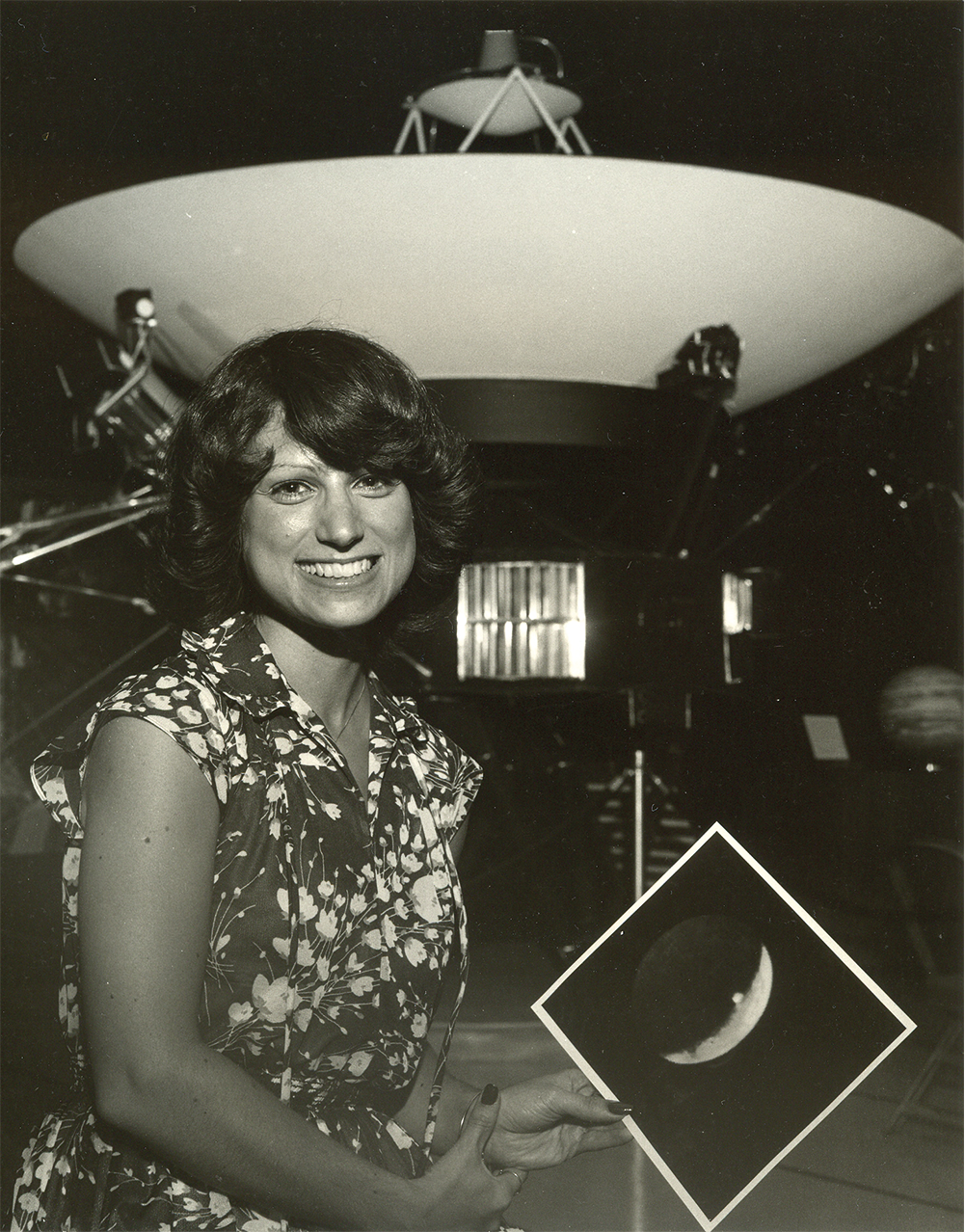
Linda Morabito pictured after her discovery of Io volcanism, in front of a model of the Voyager spacecraft, holding the discovery image

Hints of discoveries to come arose from Earth-based infrared observations taken in the 1970s. An anomalously high thermal flux, compared to the other Galilean satellites, was discovered during measurements taken at an infrared wavelength of 10 μm while Io was in Jupiter's shadow. At the time, this heat flux was attributed to the surface having a much higher thermal inertia than Europa and Ganymede. These results were considerably different from measurements taken at wavelengths of 20 μm, which suggested that Io had similar surface properties to the other Galilean satellites. Robert Nelson and Bruce Hapke attempted to explain these features in Io's spectrum by suggesting fumarolic activity as a mechanism for producing short-chain sulfur allotropes on Io's surface. It has since been determined that the greater flux at shorter wavelengths was due to the combined flux from Io's volcanoes and solar heating, whereas solar heating provides a much greater fraction of the flux at longer wavelengths. A sharp increase in Io's thermal emission at 5 μm was observed on February 20, 1978, by Witteborn, et al. The group considered volcanic activity at the time, in which case the data was fit into a region on Io 8,000 square kilometres (3,100 sq mi) in size at 600 K (300 °C; 600 °F). However, the authors considered that hypothesis unlikely, and instead focused on emission from Io's interaction with Jupiter's magnetosphere.

Shortly before the Voyager 1 encounter, Stan Peale, Patrick Cassen, and R. T. Reynolds published a paper in the journal Science predicting a volcanically modified surface and a differentiated interior, with distinct rock types rather than a homogeneous blend. They based this prediction on models of Io's interior that took into account the massive amount of heat produced by the varying tidal pull of Jupiter on Io caused by its slightly eccentric orbit. Their calculations suggested that the amount of heat generated for an Io with a homogeneous interior would be three times greater than the amount of heat generated by radioactive isotope decay alone. This effect would be even greater with a differentiated Io.

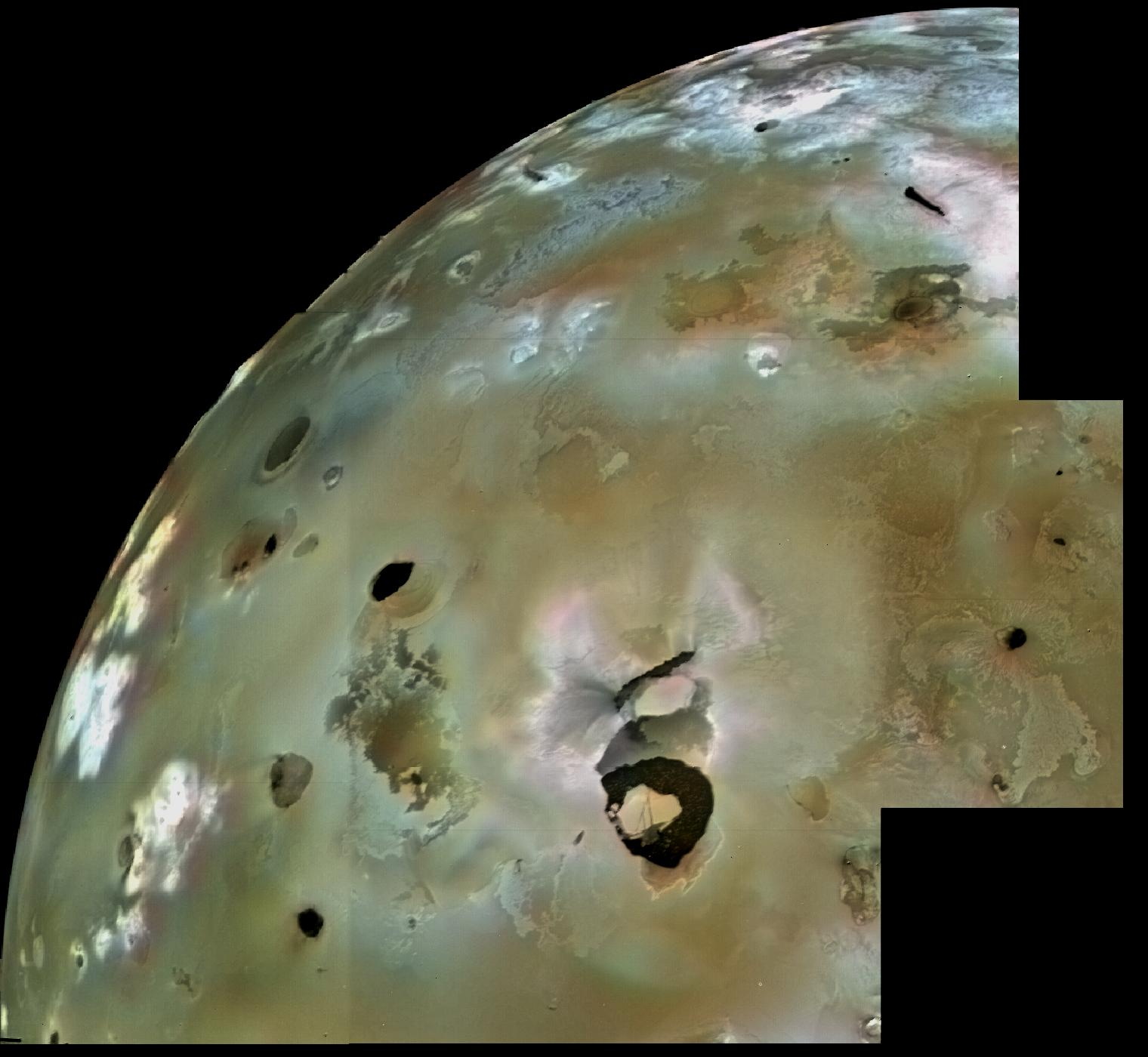
Voyager 1 observation of Loki Patera and nearby lava flows and volcanic pits

Voyager 1's first images of Io revealed a lack of impact craters, suggesting a very young surface. Craters are used by geologists to estimate the age of a planetary surface; the number of impact structures increase with the age of the planetary surface. Instead, Voyager 1 observed a multi-coloured surface, pockmarked with irregular-shaped depressions, which lacked the raised rims characteristic of impact craters. Voyager 1 also observed flow features formed by low-viscosity fluid and tall, isolated mountains that did not resemble terrestrial volcanoes. The surface observed suggested that, just as Peale and colleagues had theorized, Io was heavily modified by volcanism.

On March 8, 1979, three days after passing Jupiter, Voyager 1 took images of Jupiter's moons to help mission controllers determine the spacecraft's exact location, a process called optical navigation. By processing images of Io to enhance the visibility of background stars, navigation engineer Linda Morabito found a 300-kilometre (190 mi) tall cloud along its limb. At first, she suspected the cloud to be a moon behind Io, but no known satellite would have been in that location at that time, and the size of the object seen made it unlikely for it to be a new satellite, since at that size, it would have been seen from Earth before Voyager 1 arrived. The feature was determined to be a plume generated by active volcanism at a dark depression later named Pele. Following this discovery, eight other plumes were located in Voyager images of Io. These plumes were later named after mythological deities associated with fire, volcanoes, or mayhem: Loki (two separate plumes), Prometheus, Volund, Amirani, Maui, Marduk, and Masubi. Thermal emission from multiple sources, indicative of cooling lava, were also found. Surface changes were observed when images that had been acquired by Voyager 2 were compared to those taken four months previously by Voyager 1, including new plume deposits at Aten Patera and Surt.

== Heat source ==
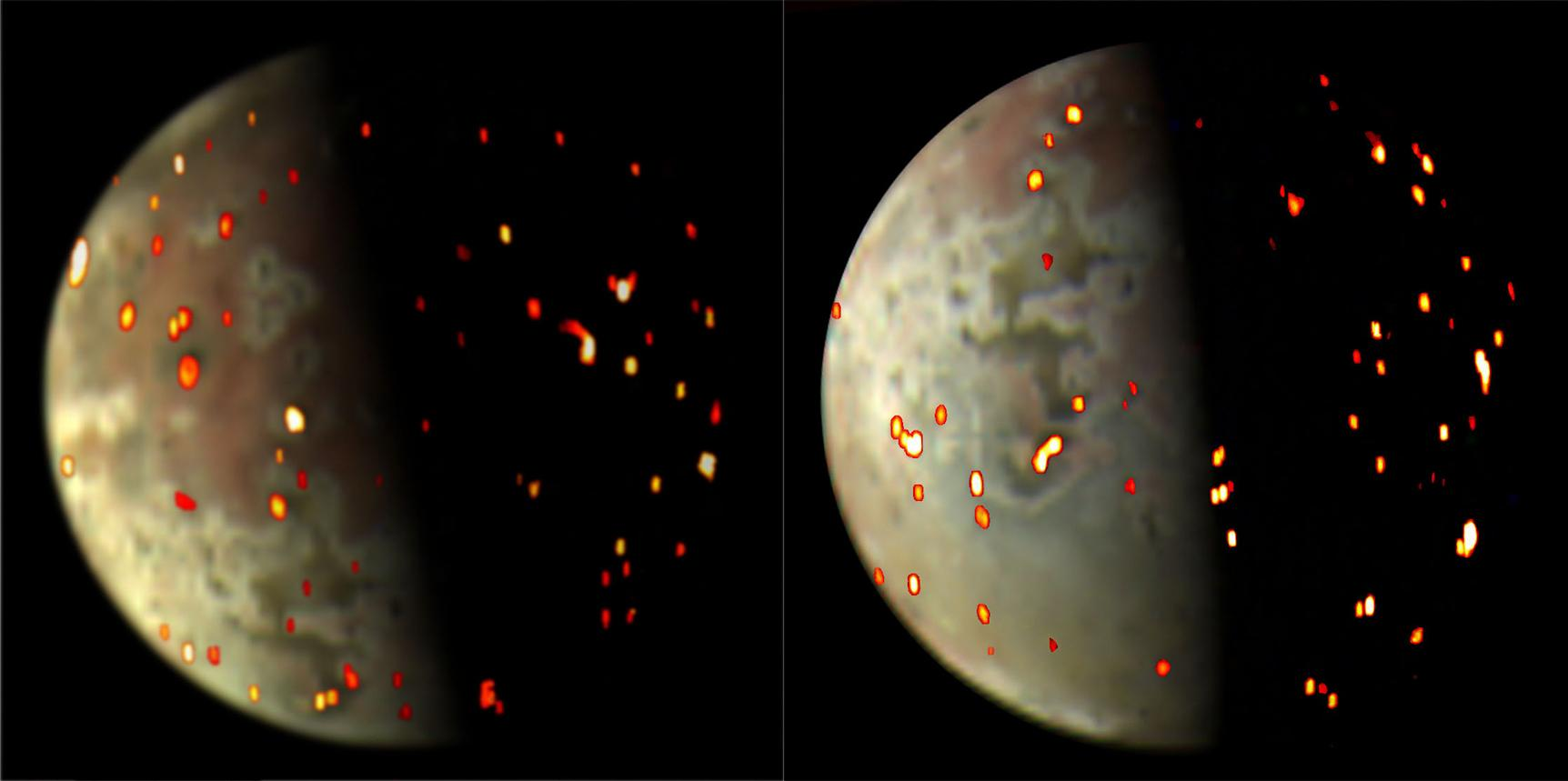
Volcanic activity on Io; Dec. 14, 2022 (left) and March 1, 2023 (right), Juno images

Io's main source of internal heat comes from the tidal forces generated by Jupiter's gravitational pull. This external heating differs from the internal heat source for volcanism on Earth, which is a result of radioactive isotope decay and residual heat from accretion. In the Earth, these internal heat sources drive mantle convection, which in turn causes volcanism through plate tectonics.

The tidal heating of Io is dependent on its distance from Jupiter, its orbital eccentricity, the composition of its interior, and its physical state. Its Laplace orbital resonance with Europa and Ganymede maintains Io's eccentricity and prevents tidal dissipation within Io from circularizing its orbit. The eccentricity leads to vertical differences in Io's tidal bulge of as much as 100 metres (330 ft) as Jupiter's gravitational pull varies between the periapsis and apoapsis points in Io's orbit. This varying tidal pull also produces friction in Io's interior, enough to cause significant tidal heating and melting. Unlike Earth, where most of its internal heat is released by conduction through the crust, on Io internal heat is released via volcanic activity and generates the satellite's high heat flow (global total: 0.6–1.6 × 10^{14} W). Models of its orbit suggest that the amount of tidal heating within Io changes with time, and that the current heat flow is not representative of the long-term average. The observed release of heat from Io's interior is greater than estimates for the amount presently generated from tidal heating, suggesting that Io is cooling after a period of greater flexing.

== Composition ==
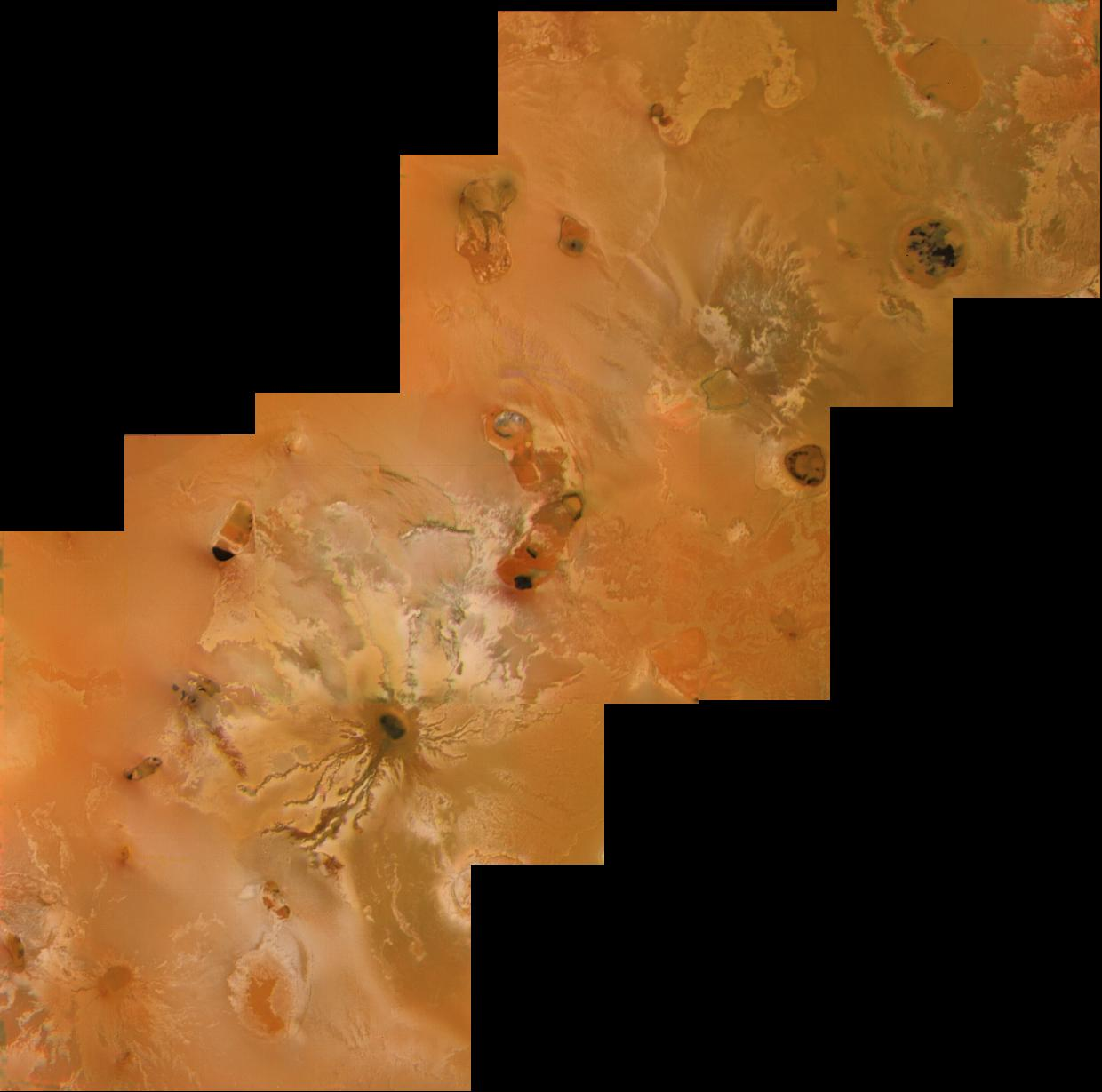
Voyager 1 image of volcanic pits and lava flows near Ra Patera

Analysis of Voyager images led scientists to believe that the lava flows on Io were composed mostly of various forms of molten elemental sulfur. The colouration of the flows was found to be similar to its various allotropes. Differences in the lava colour and brightness are a function of the temperature of polyatomic sulfur and the packing and bonding of its atoms. An analysis of the flows that radiate out from Ra Patera revealed differently colored materials, all associated with liquid sulfur, at different distances from the vent: dark albedo material close to the vent at 525 K (252 °C; 485 °F), red material in the central part of each flow at 450 K (177 °C; 350 °F), and orange material at the farthest ends of each flow at 425 K (152 °C; 305 °F). This colour pattern corresponds to flows radiating out from a central vent, cooling as the lava travels away from it. In addition, temperature measurements of thermal emission at Loki Patera taken by Voyager 1's Infrared Interferometer Spectrometer and Radiometer (IRIS) instrument were consistent with sulfur volcanism. However, the IRIS instrument was not capable of detecting wavelengths that are indicative of higher temperatures. This meant that temperatures consistent with silicate volcanism were not discovered by Voyager. Despite this, Voyager scientists deduced that silicates must play a role in Io's youthful appearance, from its high density and the need for silicates to support the steep slopes along patera walls. The contradiction between the structural evidence and the spectral and temperature data following the Voyager flybys led to a debate in the planetary science community regarding the composition of Io's lava flows, whether they were composed of silicate or sulfurous materials.

Earth-based infrared studies in the 1980s and 1990s shifted the paradigm from one of primarily sulfur volcanism to one where silicate volcanism dominates, and sulfur acts in a secondary role. In 1986, measurements of a bright eruption on Io's leading hemisphere revealed temperatures of at least 900 K (600 °C; 1,200 °F). This is higher than the boiling point of sulfur (715 K or 442 °C or 827 °F), indicating a silicate composition for at least some of Io's lava flows. Similar temperatures were also observed at the Surt eruption in 1979 between the two Voyager encounters, and at the eruption observed by Witteborn and colleagues in 1978. In addition, modeling of silicate lava flows on Io suggested that they cooled rapidly, causing their thermal emission to be dominated by lower temperature components, such as solidified flows, as opposed to the small areas covered by still molten lava near the actual eruption temperature.

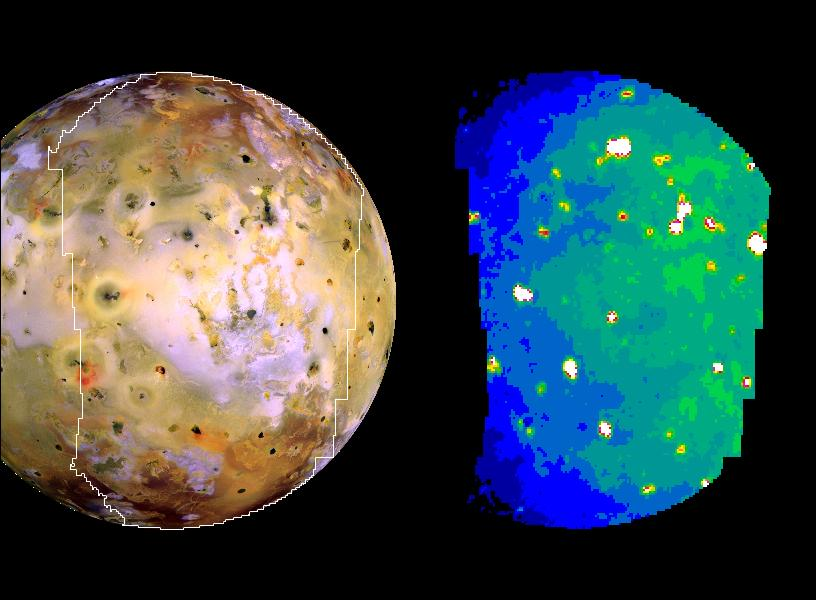
Thermal emission map of Io by Galileo

Silicate volcanism, involving basaltic lava with mafic to ultramafic (magnesium-rich) compositions, was confirmed by the Galileo spacecraft in the 1990s and 2000s from temperature measurements of Io's numerous hot spots, locations where thermal emission is detected, and from spectral measurements of Io's dark material. Temperature measurements from Galileo's Solid-State Imager (SSI) and Near-Infrared Mapping Spectrometer (NIMS) revealed numerous hot spots with high-temperature components ranging from at least 1,200 K (900 °C; 1,700 °F) to a maximum of 1,600 K (1,300 °C; 2,400 °F), like at the Pillan Patera eruption in 1997. Initial estimates during the course of the Galileo mission suggesting eruption temperatures approaching 2,000 K (1,700 °C; 3,100 °F) have since proven to be overestimates because the wrong thermal models were used to calculate the temperatures. Spectral observations of Io's dark material suggested the presence of orthopyroxenes, such as enstatite, which are magnesium-rich silicate minerals common in mafic and ultramafic basalt. This dark material is seen in volcanic pits, fresh lava flows, and pyroclastic deposits surrounding recent, explosive volcanic eruptions. Based on the measured temperature of the lava and the spectral measurements, some of the lava may be analogous to terrestrial komatiites. Compressional superheating, which could increase the temperature of magma during ascent to the surface during an eruption, may also be a factor in some of the higher temperature eruptions.

Although temperature measurements of Io's volcanoes settled the sulfur-versus-silicates debate that persisted between the Voyager and Galileo missions at Jupiter, sulfur and sulfur dioxide still play a significant role in the phenomena observed on Io. Both materials have been detected in the plumes generated at Io's volcanoes, with sulfur being a primary constituent of Pele-type plumes. Bright flows have been identified on Io, at Tsũi Goab Fluctus, Emakong Patera, and Balder Patera for example, that are suggestive of effusive sulfur or sulfur dioxide volcanism.

== Eruption styles ==
Observations of Io by spacecraft and Earth-based astronomers have led to the identification of differences in the types of eruptions seen on the satellite. The three main types identified include intra-patera, flow-dominated, and explosion-dominated eruptions. They differ in terms of duration, energy released, brightness temperature (determined from infrared imaging), type of lava flow, and whether it is confined within volcanic pits.

=== Intra-patera eruptions ===
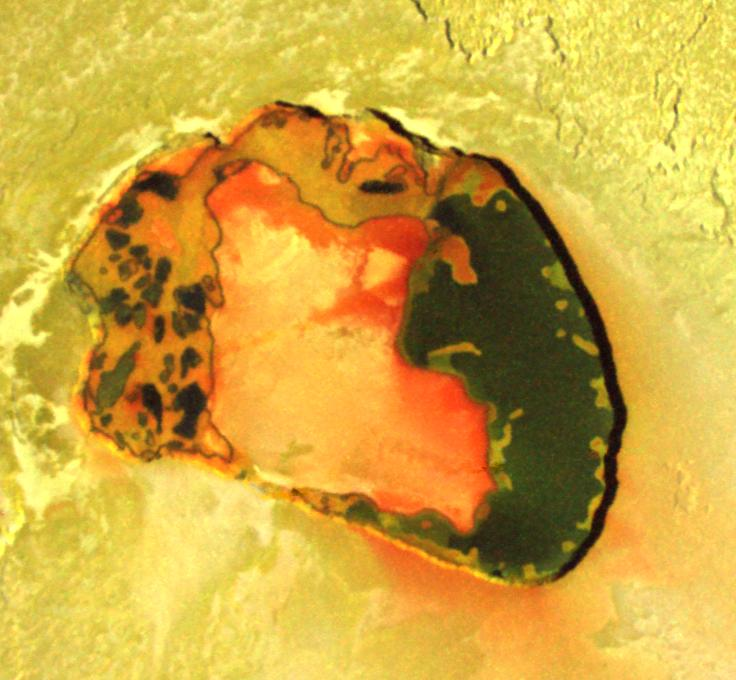
Tupan Patera, an example of a volcanic depression

Intra-patera eruptions occur within volcanic depressions known as paterae, which generally have flat floors bounded by steep walls. Paterae resemble terrestrial calderas, but it is unknown whether they form when an empty magma chamber collapses, like their terrestrial cousins. One hypothesis suggests that they are produced through the exhumation of volcanic sills, with the overlying material either being blasted out or integrated into the sill. Some paterae display evidence for multiple collapses, similar to the calderas atop Olympus Mons on Mars or Kīlauea on Earth, suggesting that they may occasionally form like volcanic calderas. Because the formation mechanism is still uncertain, the general term for these features uses the Latin descriptor term employed by the International Astronomical Union in naming them, paterae. Unlike similar features on Earth and Mars, these depressions generally do not lie at the peak of shield volcanoes and are larger, with an average diameter of 41 kilometres (25 mi). Patera depths have been measured for only a few paterae and typically exceed 1 km. The largest volcanic depression on Io is Loki Patera at 202 kilometres (126 mi) across. Whatever the formation mechanism, the morphology and distribution of many paterae suggest that they are structurally controlled, with at least half bounded by faults or mountains.

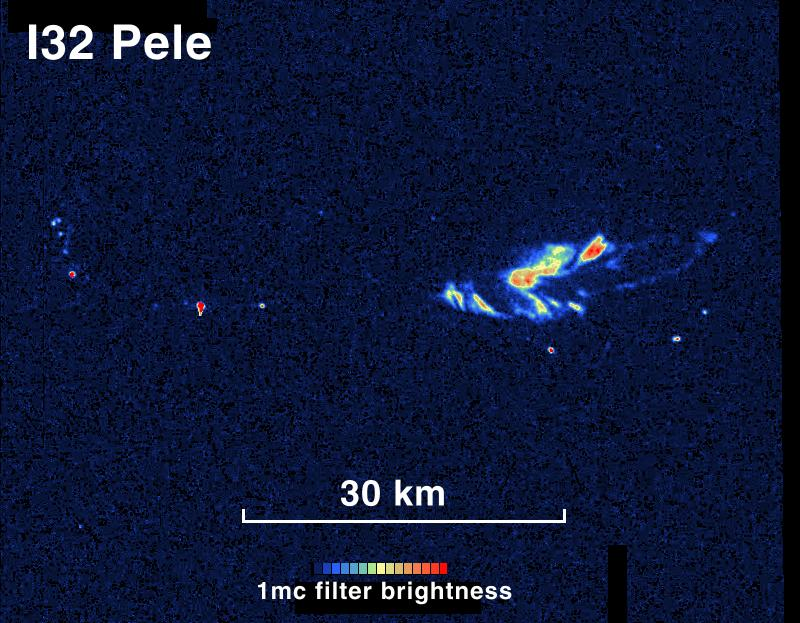
Infrared image showing night-time thermal emission from the lava lake Pele

This eruption style can take the form of either lava flows, spreading across the floor of the paterae, or lava lakes. Except for observations by Galileo during its seven close flybys, it can be difficult to tell the difference between a lava lake and a lava flow eruption on a patera floor, due to inadequate resolution and similar thermal emission characteristics. Intra-patera lava flow eruptions, such as the Gish Bar Patera eruption in 2001, can be just as voluminous as those seen spreading out across the Ionian plains. Flow-like features have also been observed within a number of paterae, like Camaxtli Patera, suggesting that lava flows periodically resurface their floors.

Ionian lava lakes are depressions partially filled with molten lava covered by a thin solidified crust. These lava lakes are directly connected to a magma reservoir lying below. Observations of thermal emission at several Ionian lava lakes reveal glowing molten rock along the patera margin, caused by the lake's crust breaking up along the edge of the patera. Over time, because the solidified lava is denser than the still-molten magma below, this crust can founder, triggering an increase in thermal emission at the volcano. For some lava lakes, like the one at Pele, this occurs continuously, making Pele one of the brightest emitters of heat in the near-infrared spectrum on Io. At other sites, such as at Loki Patera, this can occur episodically. During an overturning episode at these more quiescent lava lakes, a wave of foundering crust spreads out across the patera at the rate of about 1 kilometre (0.6 mi) per day, with new crust forming behind it until the entire lake has been resurfaced. Another eruption would only begin once the new crust has cooled and thickened enough for it to no longer be buoyant over the molten lava. During an overturning episode, Loki can emit up to ten times more heat than when its crust is stable.

=== Flow-dominated eruptions (Promethean Volcanism) ===
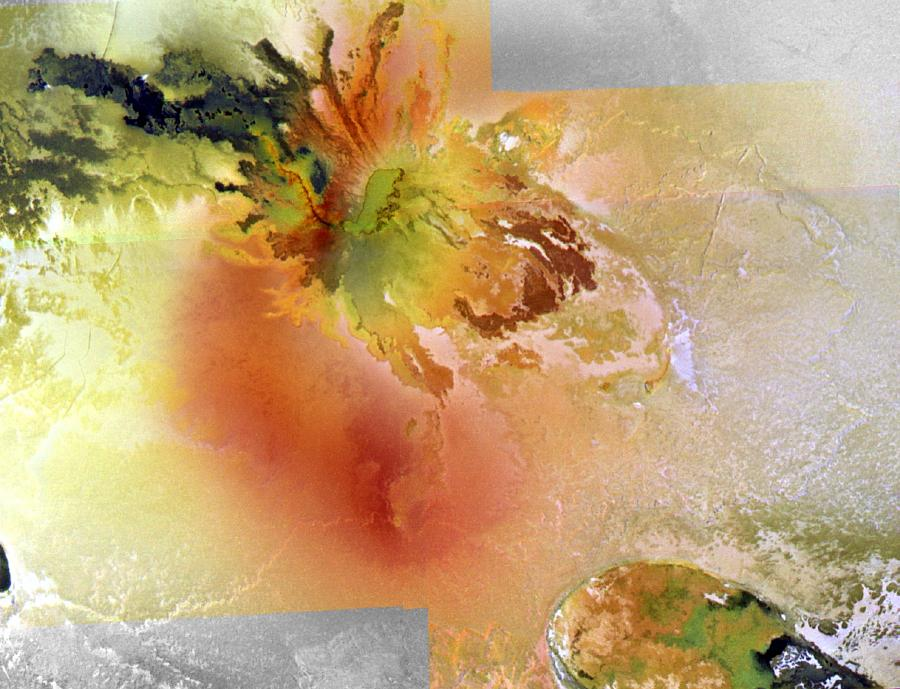
Culann Patera, an example of a flow-dominated eruption

Flow-dominated eruptions are long-lived events that build up extensive, compound lava flows. The extent of these flows makes them a major terrain type on Io. In this style of eruption, magma emerges onto the surface from vents on the floor of paterae, vents surrounding paterae, or from fissures on the plains, producing inflated, compound lava flows similar to those seen at Kīlauea in Hawaii. Images from the Galileo spacecraft revealed that many of Io's major flows, like those at Prometheus and Amirani, are produced by the build-up of small breakouts of lava on top of older flows. Flow-dominated eruptions differ from explosion-dominated eruptions by their longevity and their lower energy output per unit of time. Lava erupts at a generally steady rate, and flow-dominated eruptions can last for years or decades.

Active flow fields more than 300 kilometres (190 mi) long have been observed on Io at Amirani and Masubi. A relatively inactive flow field named Lei-Kung Fluctus covers more than 125,000 square kilometres (48,000 sq mi), an area slightly larger than Nicaragua. The thickness of flow fields was not determined by Galileo, but the individual breakouts on their surface are likely to be 1 m (3 ft) thick. In many cases, active lava breakouts flow out onto the surface at locations tens to hundreds of kilometres from the source vent, with low amounts of thermal emission observed between it and the breakout. This suggests that lava flows through lava tubes from the source vent to the breakout.

Although these eruptions generally have a steady eruption rate, larger outbreaks of lava have been observed at many flow-dominated eruption sites. For example, the leading edge of the Prometheus flow field moved 75 to 95 kilometres (47 to 59 mi) between observations by Voyager in 1979 and Galileo in 1996. Although generally dwarfed by explosion-dominated eruptions, the average flow rate at these compound flow fields is much greater than what is observed at similar contemporary lava flows on Earth. Average surface coverage rates of 35–60 square metres (380–650 sq ft) per second were observed at Prometheus and Amirani during the Galileo mission, compared to 0.6 square metres (6.5 sq ft) per second at Kīlauea.

=== Explosion-dominated eruptions (Pillanian Volcanism) ===
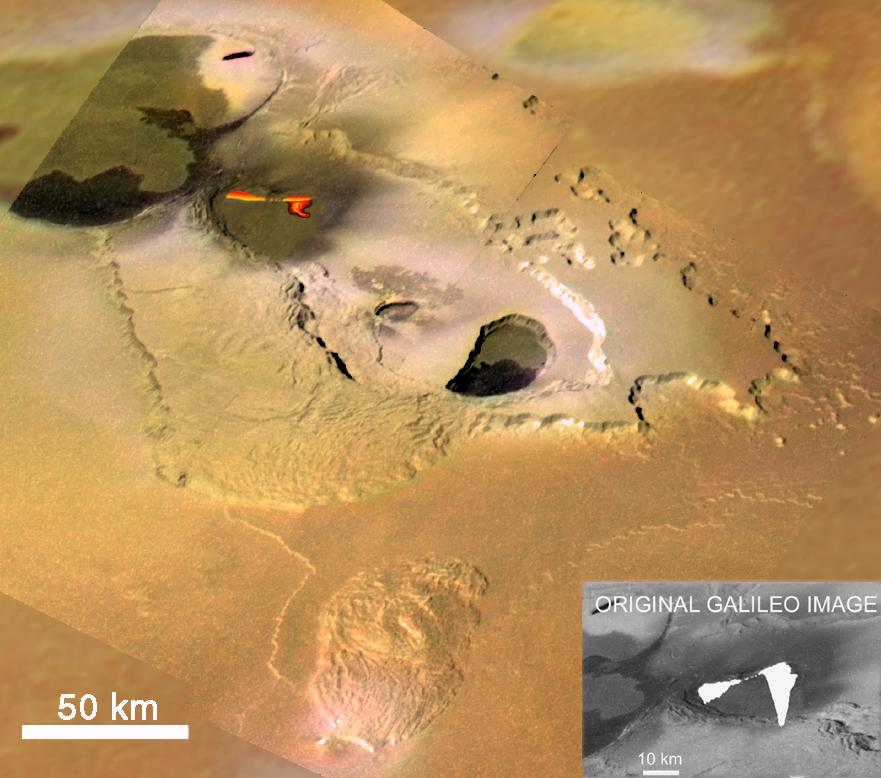
Galileo images of active lava flows and fountains at Tvashtar Paterae in 1999

Explosion-dominated eruptions are the most pronounced of Io's eruption styles. These eruptions, sometimes called "outburst" eruptions from their Earth-based detections, are characterized by their short duration (lasting only weeks or months), rapid onset, large volumetric flow rates, and high thermal emission. They lead to a short-lived, significant increase in Io's overall brightness in the near-infrared. The most powerful volcanic eruption observed on Io before the Juno era was an "outburst" eruption at Surt, observed by Earth-based astronomers on February 22, 2001. More recently, on 27 December 2024, the Jovian InfraRed Auroral Mapper (JIRAM) instrument aboard Juno observed a large volcanic outburst, centred at approximately 73°S, 140°E. The event covered a surface area of approximately 65,000 km², three times the size of Loki Patera, and produced a total power output of 140–260 TW, making it likely the most energetic volcanic event ever recorded on Io and surpassing the previous record set by the Surt eruption of 2001 (~80 TW).

Explosion-dominated eruptions occur when a body of magma (called a dike) from deep within Io's partially molten mantle reaches the surface at a fissure. This results in a spectacular display of lava fountains. During the beginning of the outburst eruption, thermal emission is dominated by strong, 1–3 μm infrared radiation. It is produced by a large amount of exposed, fresh lava within the fountains at the eruption source vent. Outburst eruptions at Tvashtar in November 1999 and February 2007 centred on a 25-kilometre (16 mi) long, 1-kilometre (0.62 mi) tall lava "curtain" produced at a small patera nested within the larger Tvashtar Paterae complex.

The large amount of exposed molten lava at these lava fountains has provided researchers with their best opportunity to measure the actual temperatures of Ionian lavas. Temperatures suggestive of an ultramafic lava composition similar to Pre-Cambrian komatiites (about 1,600 K or 1,300 °C or 2,400 °F) are dominant at such eruptions, though superheating of the magma during ascent to the surface cannot be ruled out as a factor in the high eruption temperatures.

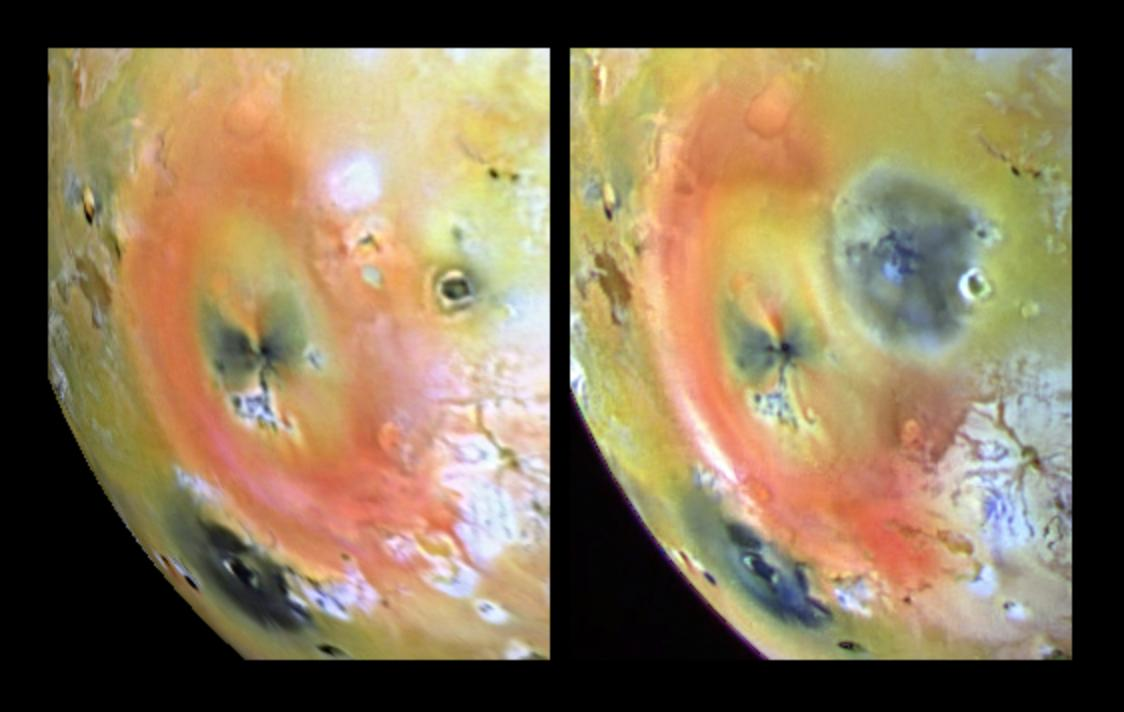
Two Galileo images, taken 168 days apart, showing the effects of an explosion-dominated eruption at Pillan Patera in 1997

Although the more explosive, lava-fountaining stage may last only a few days to a week, explosion-dominated eruptions can continue for weeks to months, producing large, voluminous silicate lava flows. A major eruption in 1997 from a fissure north-west of Pillan Patera produced more than 31 cubic kilometres (7.4 cu mi) of fresh lava over a 2 1/2- to 5 1/2-month period, and later flooded the floor of Pillan Patera. Observations by Galileo suggest lava coverage rates at Pillan between 1,000 and 3,000 square metres (11,000 and 32,000 sq ft) per second during the 1997 eruption. The Pillan flow was found to be 10 m (33 ft) thick, compared to the 1 m (3 ft) thick flows observed at the inflated fields at Prometheus and Amirani. Similar, rapidly emplaced lava flows were observed by Galileo at Thor in 2001. Such flow rates are similar to those seen at Iceland's Laki eruption in 1783 and in terrestrial flood basalt eruptions.

Explosion-dominated eruptions can produce dramatic (but often short-lived) surface changes around the eruption site, such as large pyroclastic and plume deposits produced as gas exsolves from lava fountains. The 1997 Pillan eruption produced a 400 km (250 mi) wide deposit of dark, silicate material and bright sulfur dioxide. The Tvashtar eruptions of 2000 and 2007 generated a 330 km (210 mi) tall plume that deposited a ring of red sulfur and sulfur dioxide 1,200 km (750 mi) wide. Despite the dramatic appearance of these features, without continuous resupply of material, the vent surroundings often revert to their pre-eruption appearance over a period of months (in the case of Grian Patera) or years (as at Pillan Patera).

== Plumes ==
Sequence of five New Horizons images, taken over eight minutes, showing Io's volcano Tvashtar erupting material 330 kilometres (210 mi) above its surface

The discovery of volcanic plumes at Pele and Loki in 1979 provided conclusive evidence that Io was geologically active. Generally, plumes form when volatiles like sulfur and sulfur dioxide are ejected skyward from Io's volcanoes at speeds reaching 1 kilometre per second (0.62 mi/s), creating umbrella-shaped clouds of gas and dust. Additional materials that might be found in the volcanic plumes include sodium, potassium, and chlorine. Although striking in appearance, volcanic plumes are relatively uncommon. Of the 150 or so active volcanoes observed on Io, plumes have only been observed at a couple of dozen of them. The limited area of Io's lava flows suggests that much of the resurfacing needed to erase Io's cratering record must come from plume deposits.

The most common type of volcanic plume on Io are dust plumes, or Prometheus-type plumes, produced when encroaching lava flows vaporize underlying sulfur dioxide frost, sending the material skyward. Examples of Prometheus-type plumes include Prometheus, Amirani, Zamama, and Masubi. These plumes are usually less than 100 kilometres (62 mi) tall with eruption velocities around 0.5 kilometres per second (0.31 mi/s). Prometheus-type plumes are dust-rich, with a dense inner core and upper canopy shock zone, giving them an umbrella-like appearance. These plumes often form bright circular deposits, with a radius ranging between 100 and 250 kilometres (62 and 155 mi) and consisting primarily of sulfur dioxide frost. Prometheus-type plumes are frequently seen at flow-dominated eruptions, helping make this plume type quite long-lived. Four out of the six Prometheus-type plumes observed by Voyager 1 in 1979 were also observed throughout the Galileo mission and by New Horizons in 2007. Although the dust plume can be clearly seen in sunlit visible-light images of Io acquired by passing spacecraft, many Prometheus-type plumes have an outer halo of fainter, more gas-rich material reaching heights approaching that of the larger, Pele-type plumes.

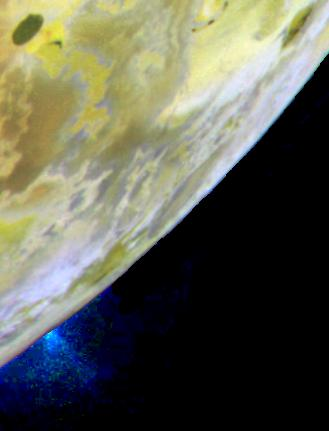
A plume, about 100 km high, erupting from the Masubi region of Io in July 1999

Io's largest plumes, Pele-type plumes, are created when sulfur and sulfur dioxide gas exsolve from erupting magma at volcanic vents or lava lakes, carrying silicate pyroclastic material with them. The few Pele-type plumes that have been observed are usually associated with explosion-dominated eruptions, and are short-lived. The exception to this is Pele, which is associated with a long-lived active lava lake eruption, though the plume is thought to be intermittent. The higher vent temperatures and pressures associated with these plumes generate eruption speeds of up to 1 kilometre per second (0.62 mi/s), allowing them to reach heights of between 300 and 500 kilometres (190 and 310 mi). Pele-type plumes form red (from short-chain sulfur) and black (from silicate pyroclastics) surface deposits, including large 1,000 kilometres (620 mi)-wide red rings, as seen at Pele. The erupted sulfurous components of Pele-type plumes are thought to be the result of an excess amount of sulfur in Io's crust and a decrease in sulfur solubility at greater depths in Io's lithosphere. They are generally fainter than Prometheus-type plumes as a result of the low dust content, causing some to be called stealth plumes. These plumes are sometimes only seen in images acquired while Io is in the shadow of Jupiter or those taken in ultraviolet. The little dust that is visible in sunlit images is generated when sulfur and sulfur dioxide condense as the gases reach the top of their ballistic trajectories. That is why these plumes lack the dense central column seen in Prometheus-type plumes, in which dust is generated at the plume source. Examples of Pele-type plumes have been observed at Pele, Tvashtar, and Grian.

== See also ==
- List of extraterrestrial volcanoes
- Volcanism on Venus
- Volcanism on Mars
- Supervolcano
