= Surt (volcano) =

Active volcano on the Jovian moon Io

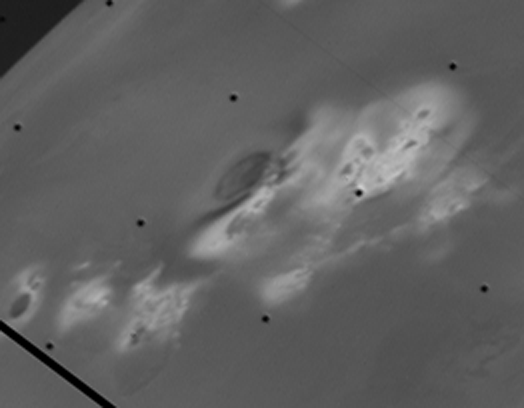
Highest Resolution image of Surt, acquired by Voyager 1 on March 5, 1979

Surt is an active volcano on Jupiter's moon Io. It is located on Io's Jupiter-facing hemisphere at . Surt consists of an oblong volcanic pit (known as a patera), 75 by 40 kilometres (47 by 25 mi) in diameter, surrounded by reddish sulfur and bright sulfur dioxide deposits to its south and east. The volcano was first observed in images acquired by the Voyager 1 spacecraft in March 1979. Later that year, the International Astronomical Union named this feature after Surtr, a leader of the fire giants of Norse mythology.

Several eruptions have been observed at Surt since it was discovered by Voyager 1. The first eruption observed by Earth-based astronomers following the discovery of Ionian volcanism took place at Surt on June 11, 1979, between the Voyager 1 and Voyager 2 flybys. When Voyager 2 encountered the Jupiter system in July 1979, the eruption appeared to have ceased, but a fresh, 600 kilometres (370 mi)-wide plume deposit was observed surrounding Surt. This plume deposit was suggestive of an active Pele-type plume at Surt between the two Voyager encounters. In addition, dark material, thought to be lava erupted during the eruption, was visible within the eastern half of the patera. When the Galileo spacecraft first took images of the area in 1996, the appearance of Surt and the surrounding terrain had reverted to its appearance as seen by Voyager 1, again suggestive of a short-lived eruption.

Surt erupted again on February 22, 2001, in the second most powerful volcanic eruption ever observed, in terms of the amount of power (in watts) output by the eruption. The total power output observed at Surt (7.2–8.4 × 10^{13} W) during this eruption nearly matches the average total power output for all of Io's volcanoes. Such event was surpassed by the eruption observed in 2024 by Juno. Despite such a violent eruption, few surface changes were observed in conjunction with the eruption in images acquired by Galileo six months later, suggesting that any changes had largely faded. Fresh, sulfur-rich, reddish deposits were seen in images acquired by Galileo in August 2001 to the northeast of Surt.
