= Pele (volcano) =

Volcano on Jupiter's moon Io

Coordinates: 18.7°S 255.3°W

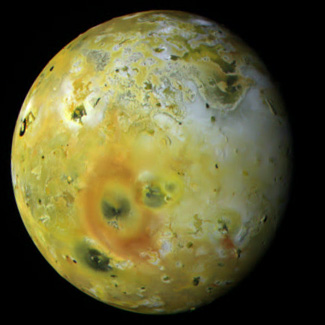
Colour image of Io's trailing hemisphere, highlighting the large red ring around the volcano Pele

Pele is an active volcano on the surface of Jupiter's moon Io. A large, 300-kilometer (190 mi) tall volcanic plume has been observed at Pele by various spacecraft starting with Voyager 1 in 1979, though it has not been persistent. The discovery of the Pele plume on March 8, 1979, confirmed the existence of active volcanism on Io. The plume is associated with a lava lake at the northern end of the mountain Danube Planum. Pele is also notable for a persistent, large red ring circling the volcano resulting from sulfurous fallout from the volcanic plume.

== Observations ==
=== Voyager ===
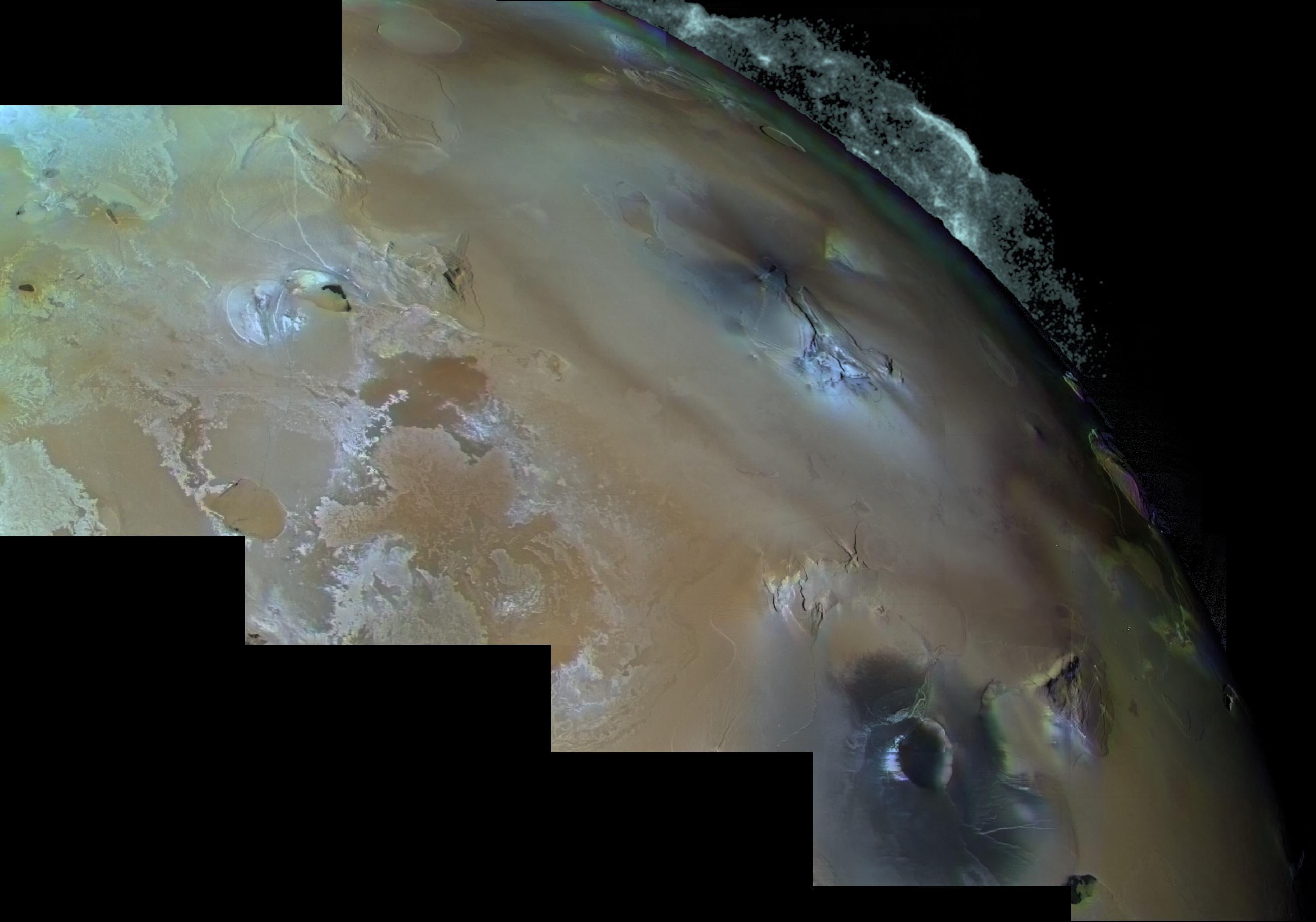
Mosaic of images taken by Voyager 1 of Pele (above right of center) and its filamentary volcanic plume

As Voyager 1 approached the Jupiter system in March 1979, it acquired numerous images of the planet and its four largest satellites, including Io. One of the most distinctive features of these distant images of Io was a large, elliptical, footprint-shaped ring on the satellite's trailing hemisphere (the side facing away from the direction of motion in a synchronously rotating satellite like Io). During the encounter itself on March 5, 1979, Voyager 1 acquired high-resolution images of the footprint-shaped region. At the center of bow tie-shaped dark region in the middle of the ring was a depression partially filled with dark material, 30 km (19 mi) by 20 km (12 mi) in size. This depression, later found to be the source of the Pele volcano, is at the northern base of a rifted mountain later named Danube Planum. With the other dramatic evidence for volcanic activity on the surface of Io from this encounter, researchers hypothesized that Pele was likely a caldera.

On March 8, 1979, three days after passing Jupiter, Voyager 1 took images of Jupiter's moons to help mission controllers determine the spacecraft's exact location, a process called optical navigation. While processing images of Io to enhance the visibility of background stars, navigation engineer Linda Morabito found a 300-kilometre (190 mi) tall cloud along the moon's limb. At first, she suspected the cloud to be a moon behind Io, but no suitably sized body would have been in that location. The feature was determined to be a volcanic plume 300 km (190 mi) tall and 1,200 km (750 mi) wide, generated by active volcanism at Pele. Based on the size of the plume observed at Pele, the ring of reddish (or dark as it appeared to Voyager's cameras, which were insensitive to red-wavelengths) material was determined to be a deposit of plume material. Following this discovery, seven other plumes were located in earlier Voyager images of Io. Thermal emission from Pele detected by the Voyager 1 Infrared Interferometer Spectrometer (IRIS) detected a thermal hotspot at Pele, indicative of cooling lava, further indicating that volcanic activity at the surface was linked to the plumes observed by Voyager 1.

When Voyager 2 flew through the Jupiter system in July 1979, its imaging campaign was modified to observe Io's plumes in action and to look for surface changes. Pele's plume, designated Plume 1 at the time as it was the first of Io's volcanic plumes to be discovered, was not seen by Voyager 2 four months later. Surface monitoring observations revealed changes with the red ring surrounding Pele. While it was heart- or hoofprint-shaped during the Voyager 1 encounter, it was now more elliptical with the notch in the southern part of the plume deposit now filled in, possibly due to changes in the distribution of plume sources within the Pele patera.

Following the Voyager encounters, the International Astronomical Union officially named the volcano after the Hawaiian volcano goddess, Pele, in 1979.

=== Galileo and beyond ===
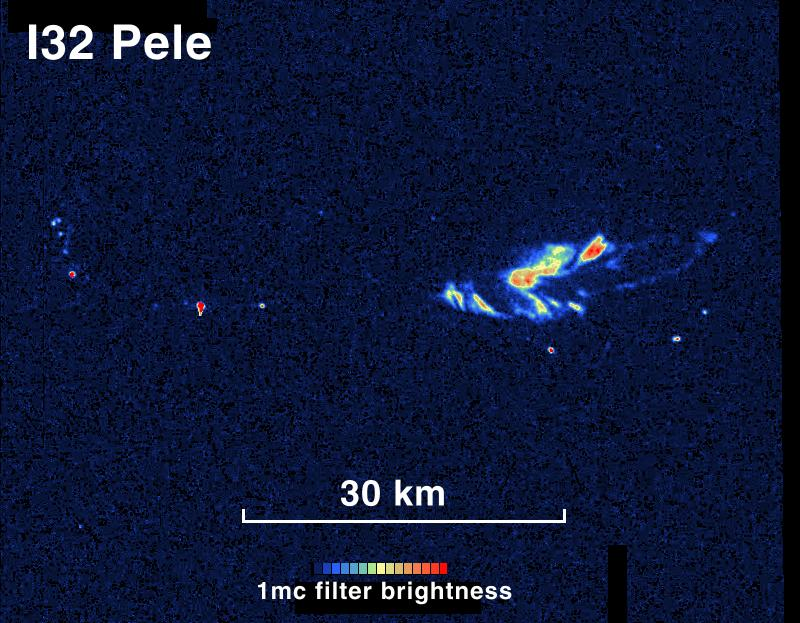
Infrared image showing night-time thermal emission from the lava lake Pele

Galileo arrived at the Jupiter system in 1995 and, from 1996 to 2001, regularly monitored volcanic activity on Io through observations of Io's thermal emission at near-infrared wavelengths, imaging Io while it was in the Jupiter's shadow in order to look for thermal hotspots at visible and near-infrared wavelengths, and imaging Io during most orbit in order to detect changes in the appearance of diffuse material and lava flows on the surface. Thermal emission from Pele was detected in nearly every occasion Io's trailing hemisphere was imaged while the moon was in the shadow of Jupiter. The volcanic plume at Pele was found to be intermittent or primarily composed of gas with occasional bursts of increased dust content. It was detected only twice by Galileo in December 1996 and December 2000. In these two detections, the plume height varied from 300 km (190 mi) to 426 km (265 mi). The plume was also detected by the Hubble Space Telescope in October 1999 while Galileo was conducting a flyby of the moon. The Hubble observations allowed for the detection of diatomic sulfur (S_{2}) for the first time on Io in Pele's plume. Subtle changes in the shape and intensity of the large red-ring plume deposit surrounding Pele were observed in daylight images of the volcano, with the most notable change seen in September 1997 when dark pyroclastic material from an eruption of Pillan Patera covered up a portion of Pele's plume deposit.

During Galileo's encounters with Io between October 1999 and October 2001, the spacecraft observed Pele on three occasions using its camera and infrared spectrometers while the volcano was on Io's night-side. The cameras revealed a curved line of bright spots along the margin of the Pele patera (a term used for volcanic depressions on Io, akin to calderas). Within the east–west dark band along the southeastern portion of the patera, a large amount of thermal emission was observed, with temperatures and distribution consistent with a large, basaltic lava lake.

Thermal emission at Pele was also seen in December 2000 by the Cassini spacecraft, in December 2001 from the Keck Telescope in Hawaii, and by the New Horizons spacecraft in February 2007.

== Physical characteristics ==
=== Lava lake ===
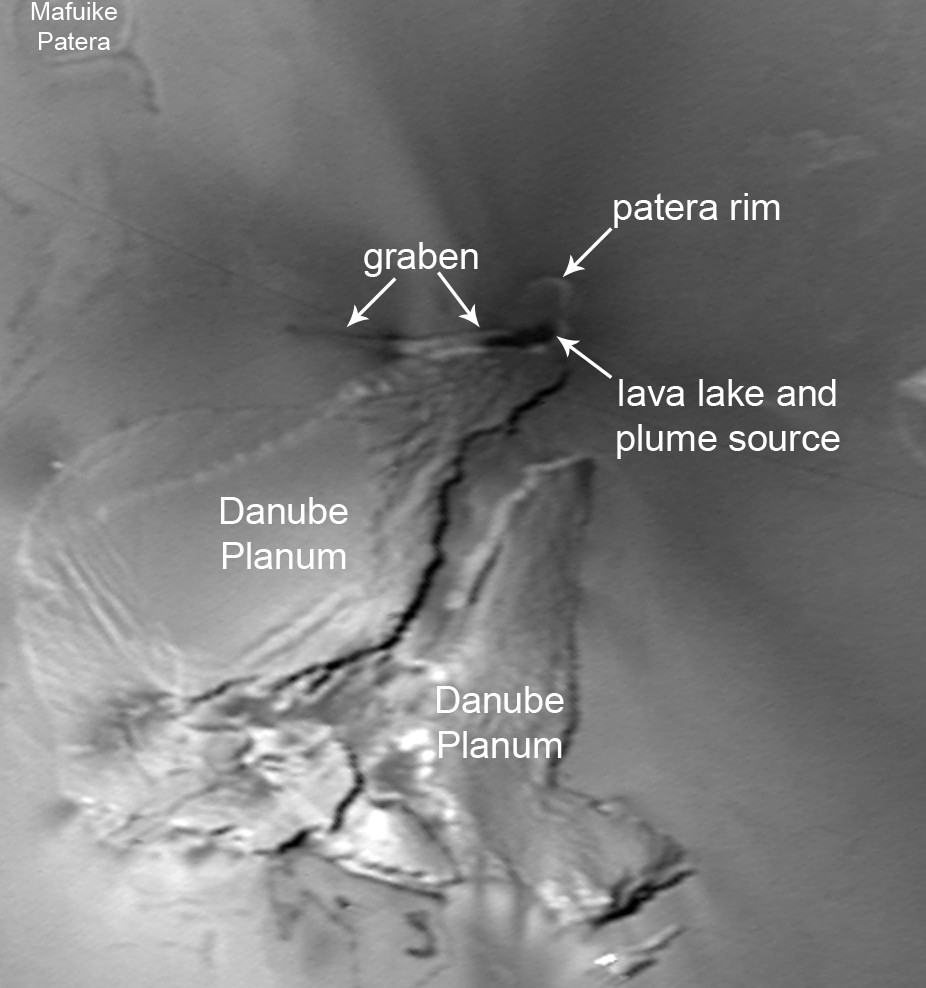
Highest resolution image of Pele taken by Voyager 1 in March 1979

Pele has a volcanic crater, also known as a patera, 30 km (19 mi) by 20 km (12 mi) in size, which lies at the base of the northern tip of the mountain Danube Planum. The patera has multiple floor levels, with a higher north-eastern section and a lower section that consists of an east–west-trending graben. Volcanic activity at Pele, as seen in images taken by Galileo in October 2001 while Pele was on Io's night side, appears to be limited to small thermal "hot-spots" along the margins of the patera and a more intense thermal emission source within a dark area in the southeast portion of the patera floor. This distribution of activity, combined with Pele's stability as a hotspot in terms of temperature and power emitted, suggests that Pele is a large, active lava lake, a combination of eruption style and intensity of activity not seen elsewhere on Io. The small hotspots seen in the Galileo data represent areas where the crust of the lava lake breaks up along the margins of the patera, allowing fresh lava to become exposed at the surface. The southeastern portion of the patera, an area of dark terrain in Voyager 1 imagery, is the most active region of the Pele volcano, with the most extensive region of hot lava at Pele. This area is thought to be a vigorously overturning lava lake, suggestive of a combination of a large mass flux of lava to the lake from a magma reservoir below the surface and a large mass fraction of dissolved volatiles like sulfur dioxide and diatomic sulfur. Given Pele's brightness at near-infrared wavelengths, activity at this portion of the lava lake may also result in lava fountaining.

Lava temperatures measured using the near-infrared emission spectrum of thermal hotspots observed at Pele are consistent with silicate basaltic lava erupting at the lava lake. The measurements from Galileo and Cassini images of Pele suggest peak temperatures of at least 1250–1350 °C, while the near-infrared spectrometer on Galileo found peak temperatures of 1250–1280 °C. While Pele's energy output and temperature remained consistent on the timescale of months to years throughout much of the Galileo missions, measurements of Pele's brightness using Cassini data taken during an eclipse of Io by Jupiter found considerable variations on the timescale of minutes. This is consistent with variations in the distribution and size of lava fountains at Pele over that timeframe.

=== Plume ===
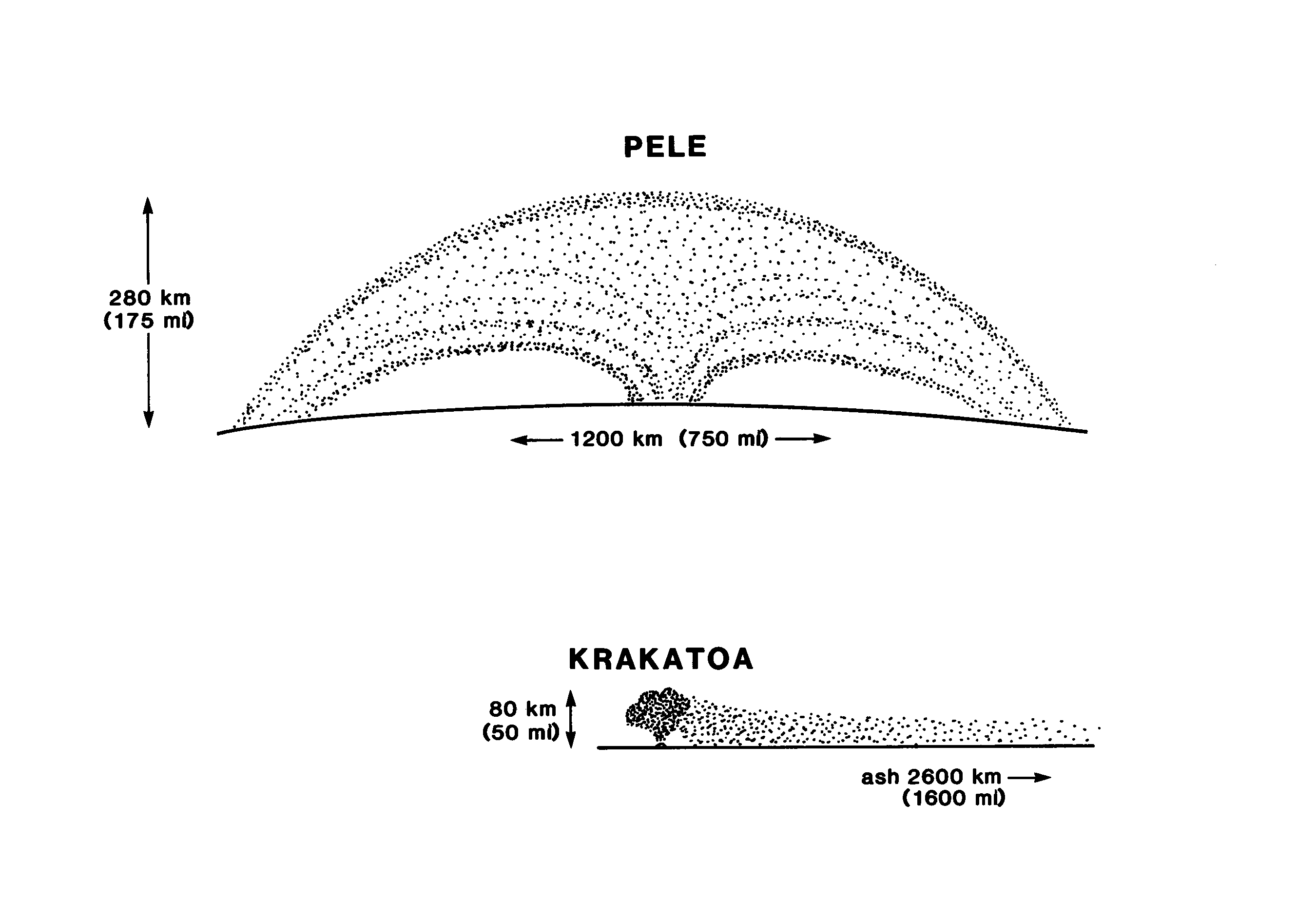
Pele-type plume compared to the eruption column of a large volcanic eruption on Earth (Krakatoa, 1883)

Pele's plume is the archetypal Pele-type plume: 300 km (190 mi) tall, producing a large reddish deposit that is concentric around the source vent. The plume is created from the degassing of sulfur (S_{2}) and sulfur dioxide (SO_{2}) from erupting lava in the Pele lava lake. The persistence of degassed sulfurous compounds to Pele's plume is likely from a stable and consistent magma supply to its lava lake, which could be the largest magma chamber of Io's volcanoes. Images of the plume taken by Voyager 1 revealed a large structure without a central column like the smaller, Prometheus-type plumes, but instead having a filamentary structure. This morphology is consistent with a plume that is formed by sulfurous gases erupted skyward from the Pele lava lake, which then condense into solid S_{2} and SO_{2} when they reach the shock canopy along the outer edge of the umbrella-shaped plume. These condensed materials then are deposited onto the surface, forming a large, red, oval-shaped ring around the Pele volcano. The oval shape of the deposits, elongated in roughly the north–south direction, may be the result of an east–west, linear source region, consistent with the shape and orientation of the graben that forms the southern and more active portion of the Pele patera. Variable activity in different portions of the Pele lava lake may also result in the changes in brightness and shape of the plume deposit over time observed by various spacecraft.
