= Zamama (volcano) =

Active volcanic center on Io

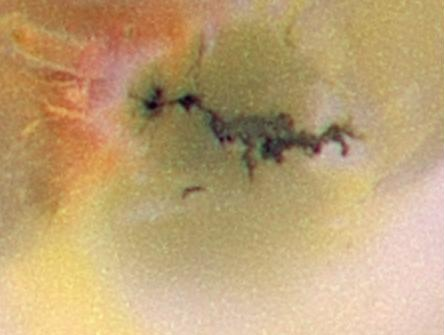
Image of the Zamama volcanic center, taken by Galileo in July 1999

Zamama is an active volcanic center on Jupiter's moon Io. This volcanic center erupted after the Voyager 1 flyby in 1979, making it one of the few planetary volcanoes known to have activated during this generation's lifetime. Further analysis and study by the Galileo spacecraft helped with the overall study of Io's volcanism. Galileo located it on Io at 21°N 173°W. Zamama has a fissure-fed-type flow that is 150 km (93 mi) long with temperatures of 1,100 K (830 °C; 1,520 °F), and the volcanic center site has explosive and effusive eruption characteristics. The flow appears to be emanating from the Promethean-type volcano.

Remote sensing instruments built on the Galileo spacecraft—the Near-Infrared Mapping Spectrometer (NIMS), Solid-State Imager (SSI), Photopolarimeter-Radiometer (PPR)—collect and analyze volcanism on Io's surface. Since there are no samples collected from Io, all of the interpretations are made by studying albedo effects, morphology and/or spectral variations in Galileo data. Furthermore, Geomorphologic analysis is strictly used to study such specific planetary structures.

== Overview of the Voyager and Galileo missions ==
Most of the data acquired from the Jovian moon Io was derived from geomorphologic interpretations of orbital imaging. Voyager 1 and Galileo both used thermal remote sensing to accomplish this task. Thermal remote sensing is a branch of remote sensing which deals with processing and interpretations of data in the thermal infrared (TIR) region of the electromagnetic (EM) spectrum. Zamama is a hotspot/volcanic center among 61 active volcanic centers on Io. These were observed by the Voyager flybys, by Galileo, and by ground-based observations. Zamama was first observed by Galileo, which identified two types of volcanic activity: persistent and sporadic. The NIMS instrument detected activity at Zamama lasting longer than one year; therefore, it is considered the persistent type. It has only been NIMS-detected five times, but NIMS-observed nine times. This lower incidence of detection could be due to observational constraints or temporary waning of activity.

== Volcanism on Zamama ==
=== Volcanic topography ===
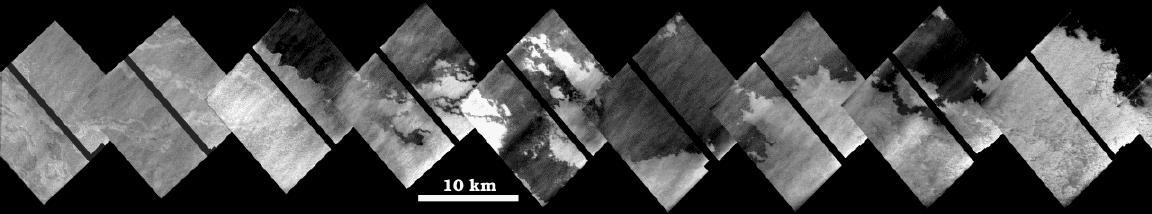
Lava flow field on Zamama. Image was captured using Solid-State Imaging during the Galileo mission.

Io is one of the most challenging Jovian moons for which to establish topography. A couple techniques aided in the making of Io's topography, such as "3D" stereo photogrammetry (SP) and "2D" photoclinometry (PC). Ionian volcanoes have been poorly characterized because of their volcanic construct, which is different from well-studied planetary volcanoes such as those on Mars. Two common flow field morphologies have been identified on Io:

- Large broad irregular flows (flow sheets).
- Radially centered flow fields.

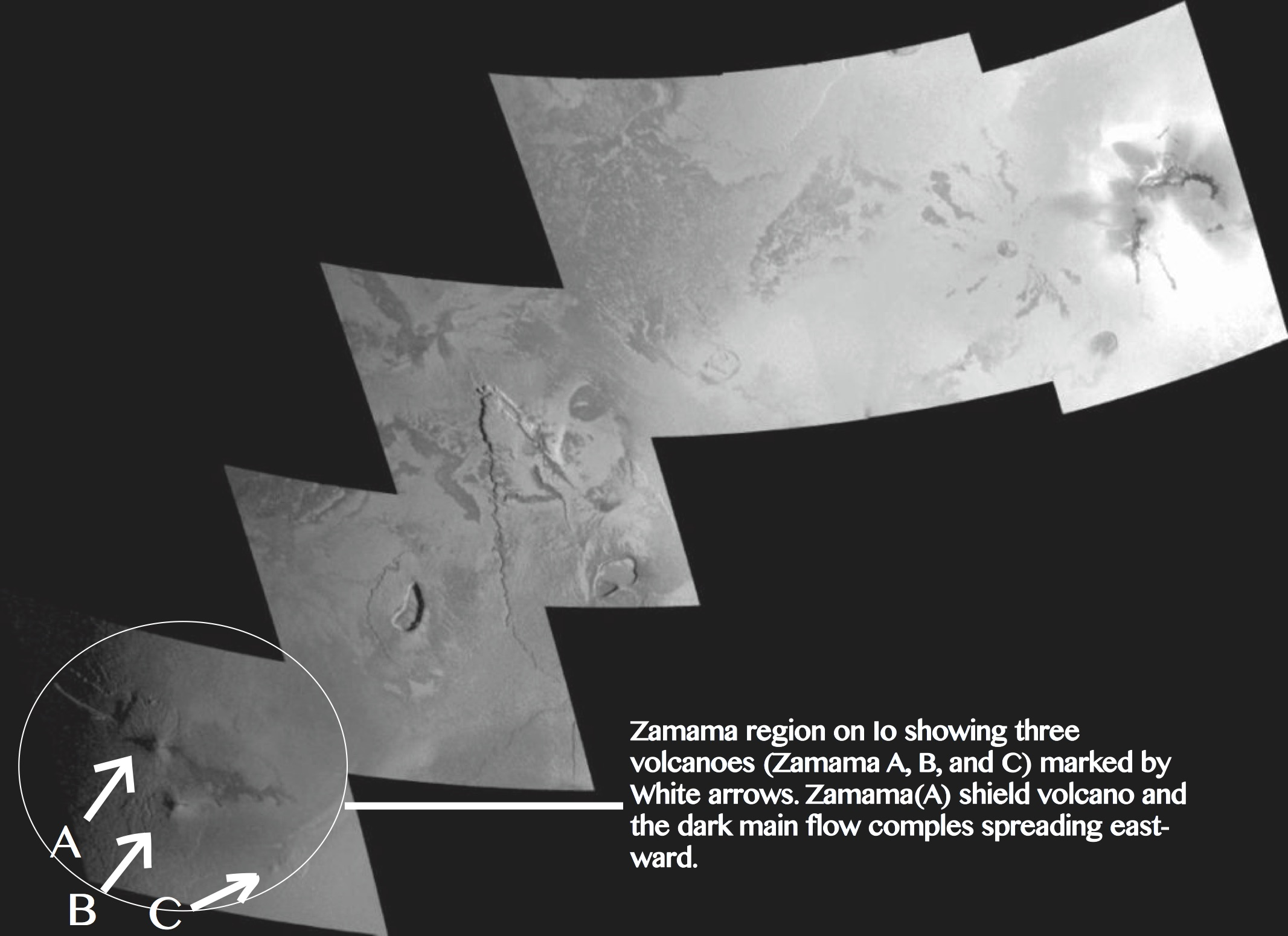
Zamama region on Io showing three volcanoes (Zamama A, B, and C) marked by white arrows. Zamama (A) shield volcano and the dark main flow complex spreading eastward.

The Zamama active volcanic center is characterized morphologically by a radially centered flow field. Multiple steep-sided shield volcanoes lie in this area:

- Zamama A (18°N, 175°W), is about 40 km (25 mi) wide, 1.5 km (0.93 mi) high, and has an average slope of 40°. Slope and height were estimated by PC. It extends about 140 km (87 mi) east and beyond the topographic margin of the observed steep-sided shield. Zamama A is the source of the Zamama flow field. The origin of volcanism is both siliceous and sulfuric, although Zamama originates from a Prometheus-type plume.
- Zamama B is located 75 km (47 mi) southeast of Zamama A, and is about 40 km (25 mi) wide and 1–1.5 km (0.62–0.93 mi) high. Height was estimated by PC shadow measurements.
- Zamama C (15°N, 170°W) is located 175 km (109 mi) southeast of the Zamama volcanic center, is about 250 m (820 ft) high, and has a slope that ranges between 3°-5°. Height was determined by PC.

=== Surface changes ===
Zamama appears to have been inactive during the 1979 Voyager 1 visit, or, it may have been buried by the Volund deposits. In contrast, Zamama appeared as a very active hot spot during the Galileo observations. Zamama has shown three notable surface changes in the SSI collected images. Images show them as bright rings, placed within the dark lava flows, with diameters of about 370 km (230 mi). In addition, new black rings were deposited north and northeast of the central prominent eruption. This most prominent central eruption was the first to take place (18° N, 171° W). The total area changed was about 136,000 km^{2} (53,000 mi^{2}). Second, a new eruption caused broadening in the central dark deposits of the western side and new bright rings were deposited along the margins of the lava flows. The total area effected was about 37,000 km^{2} (14,000 mi^{2}). Third, Zamama's third plume was actively erupting while Galileo was on its 14th orbit around Jupiter. New deposits enlarged to 150 ± 5 km (93.2 ± 3.1 mi) and are centered east of the eruptive center. Total affected area was about 96,000 km^{2} (37,000 mi^{2}).

=== Temperature ===
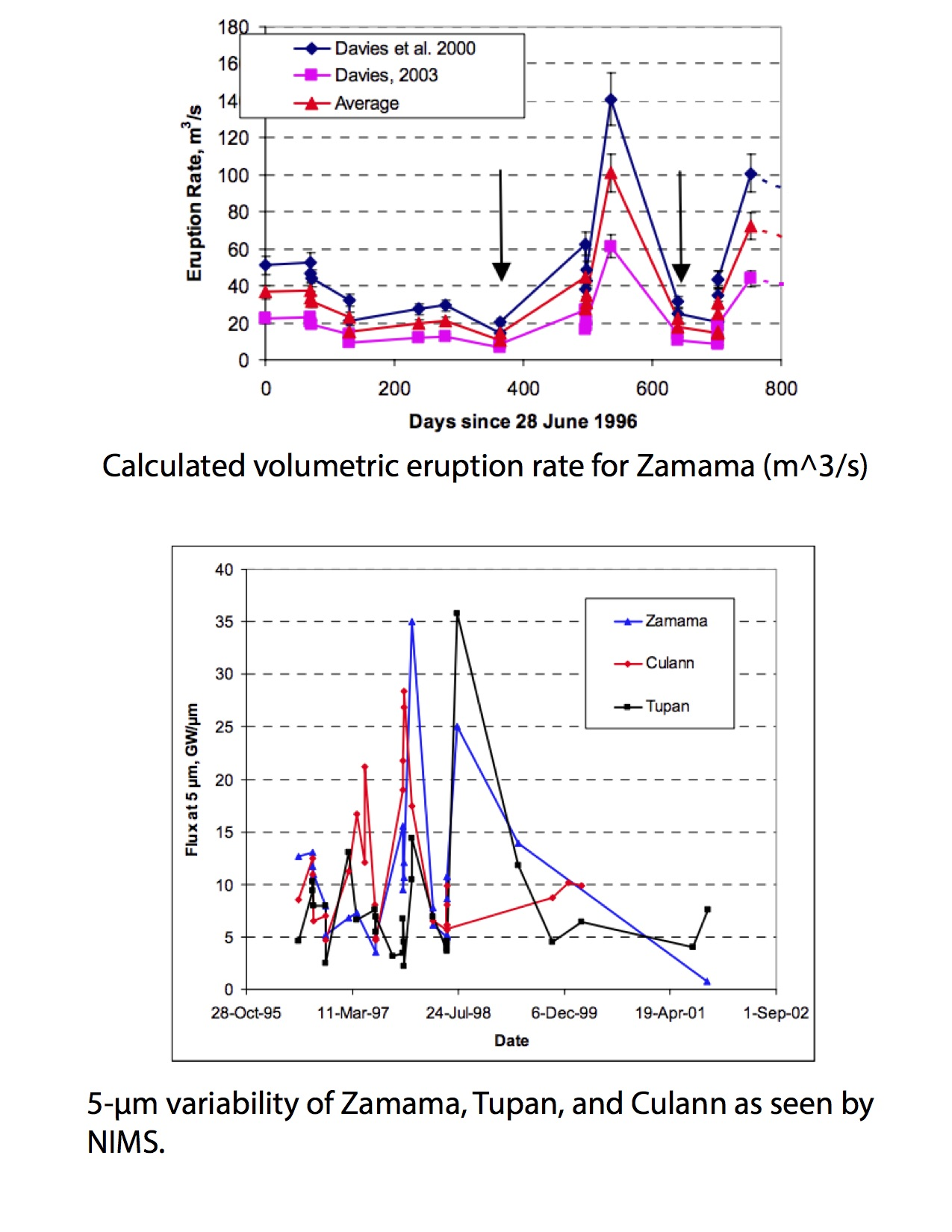
The graph of eruption rate shows plunges which indicate lessening in diffusive activity or cooling of old flow surface. As well, it shows a spike, which indicates the beginning of a new eruption. The power output flux graph compares Zamama with other Ionian volcanoes of the same eruptive style.

Galileo's NIMS instrument collected data on volcanic emissions to analyze the power output. A two-temperature model is used to determine the temperature and power output. Models have shown that Zamama has a temperature of 1,173 ± 243 K (900 ± 243 °C; 1,652 ± 437 °F). Pyroclastic flows with high silica content can have temperatures as high as 1,200 °C (1,470 K; 2,190 °F). Since Zamama volcanoes have such high temperatures, this indicates siliceous magma. No actual samples of Zamama's magma have been retrieved and processed for composition.

=== Composition ===
Lava flows at Zamama suggest that it is a shield volcano with a central vent and a rift zone. The rift zone seems to feed the dark flow field, which appeared in the Galileo visit. The flow field appeared narrow/thin closer to the center, and wide/broad away from the center. This behavior might be due to a change in slope from the volcano rim to the nearby plains. The central vent emanates bright flows, due to sulfurous lava composition or silicate lava coated by sulfurous deposits. The composition of the lava emitted from the volcano is still mysterious.

=== Volcanic parameters ===
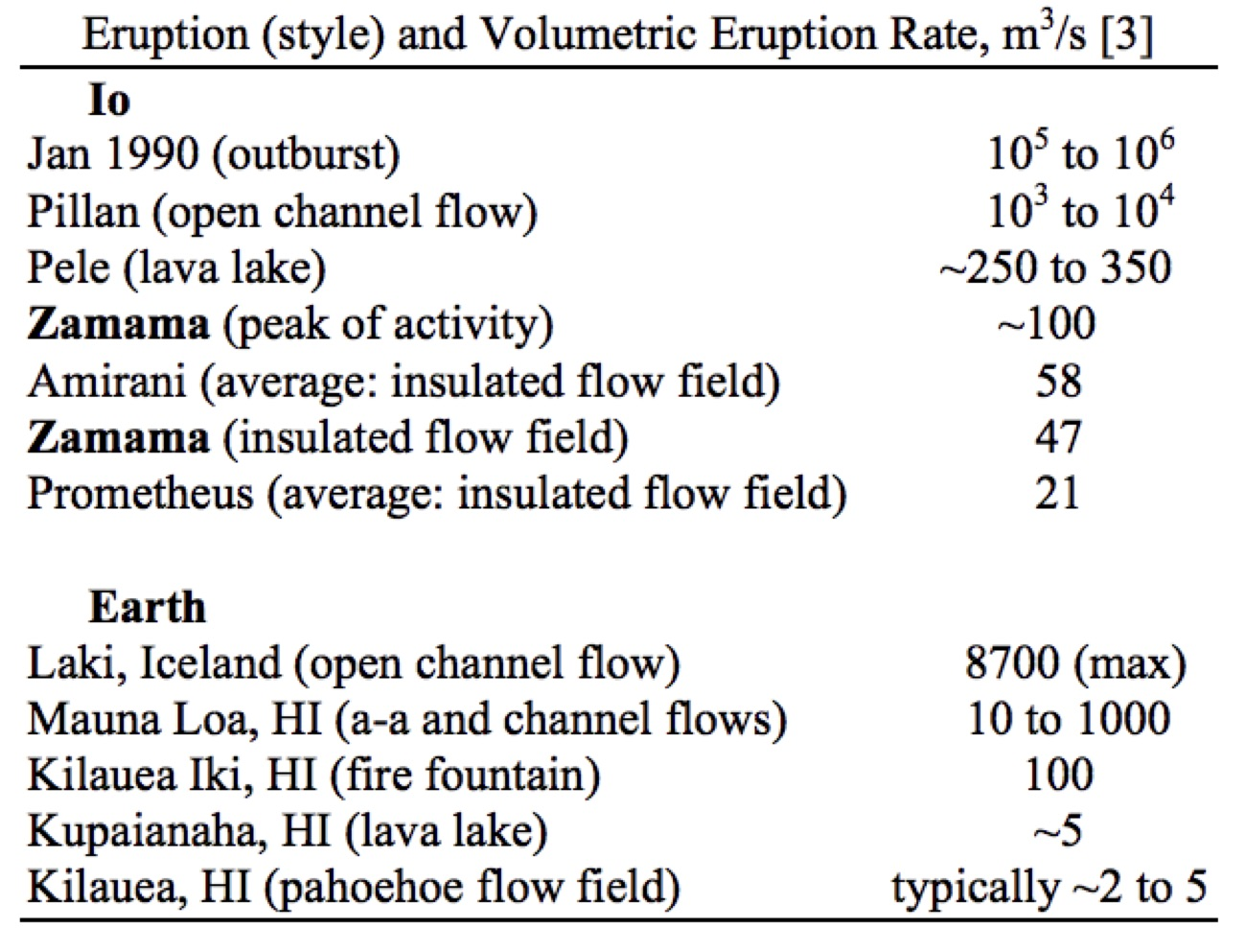
Zamama has lower volumetric emission rates, compared with other Ionian volcanoes of the same eruptive style, and is more powerful than its terrestrial counterparts such as the volcano Kīlauea in Hawaii.

NIMS data analysis was conducted to determine the variability of thermal emissions from volcanoes on Io—particularly Zamama—for 1,038 days (28 June 1996 to 2 May 1999) and the results showed:

- Average volumetric rates decreased at the beginning of the period, which indicates a lessening in diffusive activity, or cooling of old flow surface. Later, there was an increase in volcanic activity, indicating the beginning of an eruption.
- Total power output observed at Zamama was 1.25×10^{19} J.
- Average power output was 139.8 GW.
- Total volume erupted through this period was 3.5 ± 1.4 km^{3} (0.84 ± 0.34 mi^{3}).
- Average volumetric flux was 39.4 ± 15.5 m^{3}/s (1,390 ± 550 cu ft/s).

== Comparison and evolution ==
=== Comparisons with Ionian and terrestrial volcanoes ===
- Zamama has lower volumetric emission rates compared to various styles of eruptions on Io.
- Zamama is more powerful than its terrestrial counterparts such as Kīlauea, Hawaii.
- In general, Io's eruptions have larger volumetric fluxes and active areas than terrestrial volcanoes, compared with volcanoes of the same eruption style.

=== Evolution of Ionian shield volcanoes ===
Model demonstrating how caldera volcanoes collapse.

Most Ionian volcanoes start as steep-sided shield volcanoes. After an eruptive construct-building phase, the central region collapses to form a caldera. Since steep-sided shield volcanoes have not been observed inside collapsed calderas, this indicates a failure to reform steep-sided volcanoes after the collapse, which can be associated with various variables such as change in temperature, eruptive rate, and/or lava composition. Failure to reform shield volcanoes is caused by failure to supply magma through the magma chamber. These interpretations might be a sign that current shield volcanoes will follow this pattern and transform to caldera-forming eruptive sites.

== Future Io exploration ==
Williams (2013) suggests the need for a variety of methods for observing Io in the future: "Future Io exploration is recommended to include: 1) a Jupiter-orbiting Io Observer spacecraft of either Discovery-class or New Frontiers-class; 2) a space-based UV telescope with diffraction-limited capability; 3) space-based missions that enable long-term monitoring of Io over a variety of time scales (seconds, minutes, hours, days, months, years); and 4) expanded time for Io observation on ground-based 8- to 10-m class telescopes, particularly those with nighttime Adaptive Optics capability."
