= Loki Patera =

Largest volcanic depression on Jupiter's moon Io

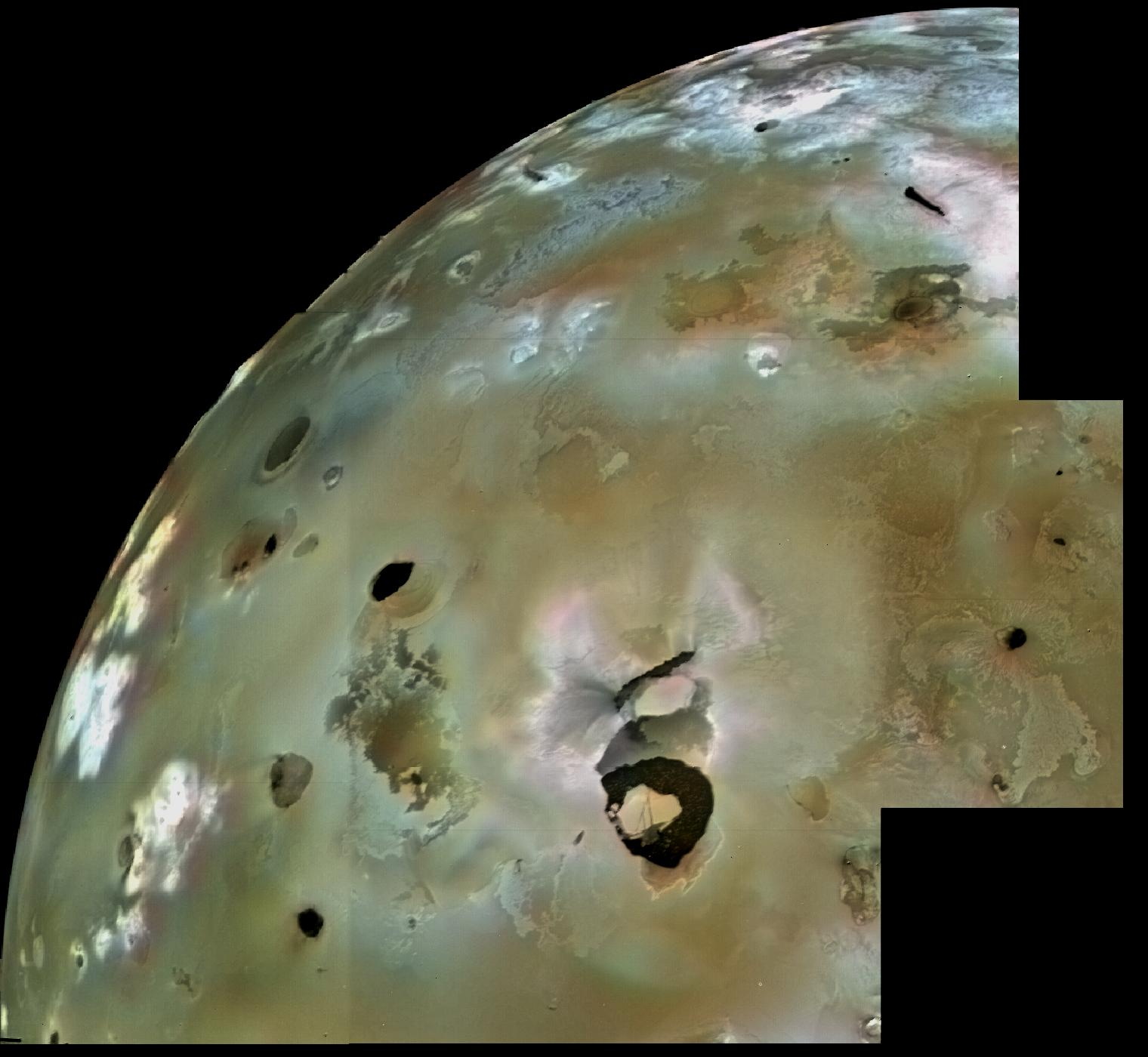
Voyager 1 observation of Loki Patera and nearby lava flows and volcanic pits.

Loki Patera on moon Io (artist's concept; 0:18).

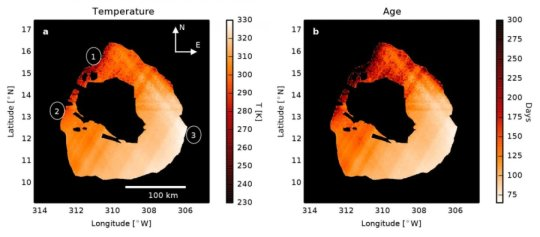
Map of temperature and crust age of Loki Patera obtained by the Large Binocular Telescope.

Loki Patera /ˈloʊki ˈpætərə/ is the largest volcanic depression on Jupiter's moon Io, 202 kilometres (126 mi) in diameter. It contains an active lava lake, with an episodically overturning crust. The level of activity seen is similar to a superfast spreading mid-ocean ridge on Earth. It is the largest volcano on Io, producing about 10% of Io's total thermal emission. Temperature measurements of thermal emission at Loki Patera taken by Voyager 1's Infrared Interferometer Spectrometer and Radiometer (IRIS) instrument were consistent with sulfur volcanism.

Loki Patera is located at 13°N 308.8°W. It is named after the Norse god Loki. Amaterasu Patera is located to the north and Manua Patera to the northwest.

== Geology ==
Io's lava lakes such as Loki Patera are depressions partially filled with molten lava covered by a thin solidified crust. These lava lakes are directly connected to a magma reservoir below. Observations of thermal emission at several of Io's lava lakes reveal glowing molten rock along Loki Patera's margin, caused by the lake's crust breaking up along the edge of the patera. Over time, because the solidified lava is denser than the still-molten magma below, this crust can founder, exposing fresh, hot molten rock. At sites such as Loki Patera, this can occur episodically. During an overturning episode, Loki can emit up to ten times more heat than when its crust is stable.

During an eruption, a wave of foundering crust has been observed to spread out across the patera at the rate of about 1 km (3,300 ft) per day, until the crust of the lake has been resurfaced. Another eruption then begins once the new crust has cooled and thickened enough for it to no longer be buoyant over the molten lava. IInfrared observations by the Juno/JIRAM instrument between 2022 and 2024 measured a phase velocity of approximately 2–3 km per day for a single counterclockwise resurfacing wave, with crust thickness estimated at 5–6 m at the end of the observed cycle.

== History ==
On 8 March 2015, a rare orbital alignment occurred between Io and Europa, two of the moons of Jupiter, that allowed researchers to distinguish heat being emitted from Loki Patera. They were able to accomplish this because Europa's surface is coated in water ice which reflects small amounts of sunlight at infrared wavelengths. Scientists were able to determine that there were two waves of resurfacing lava, which explains the change in brightness on Loki Patera every 400–600 days. The images that helped researchers discover this were captured by the Large Binocular Telescope Observatory in southeast Arizona. The observation also revealed that there is a difference in the magma supply of the two halves of Loki.

In December 2023 and February 2024, the Juno spacecraft completed extremely close flybys of Io, including the first closeup images of the northern latitudes, showing the islands within Loki Patera surrounded by a reflective glassy black surface. Analysis of JIRAM infrared images at pixel scales as small as 400 m confirmed the presence of at least 20 small islands (~3 km wide, ~10 km apart) that have remained in fixed positions since Voyager 1's flyby in 1979, indicating they are anchored to the lake floor rather than floating on the lava surface. Thermal modeling indicates that at least 10 m of molten magma underlies the crust, implying a lake depth of at least a few tens of meters.

== See also ==
- Volcanism on Io
- List of volcanic features on Io

== Bibliography ==
- "NIMS Observes Increased Activity at Loki Patera, Io", JPL Planetary Photojournal
- "An Impact Genesis for Loki Patera?" Lunar and Planetary Science XXXVI (2005)
