= Prometheus (volcano) =

Rupture in the surface of Io

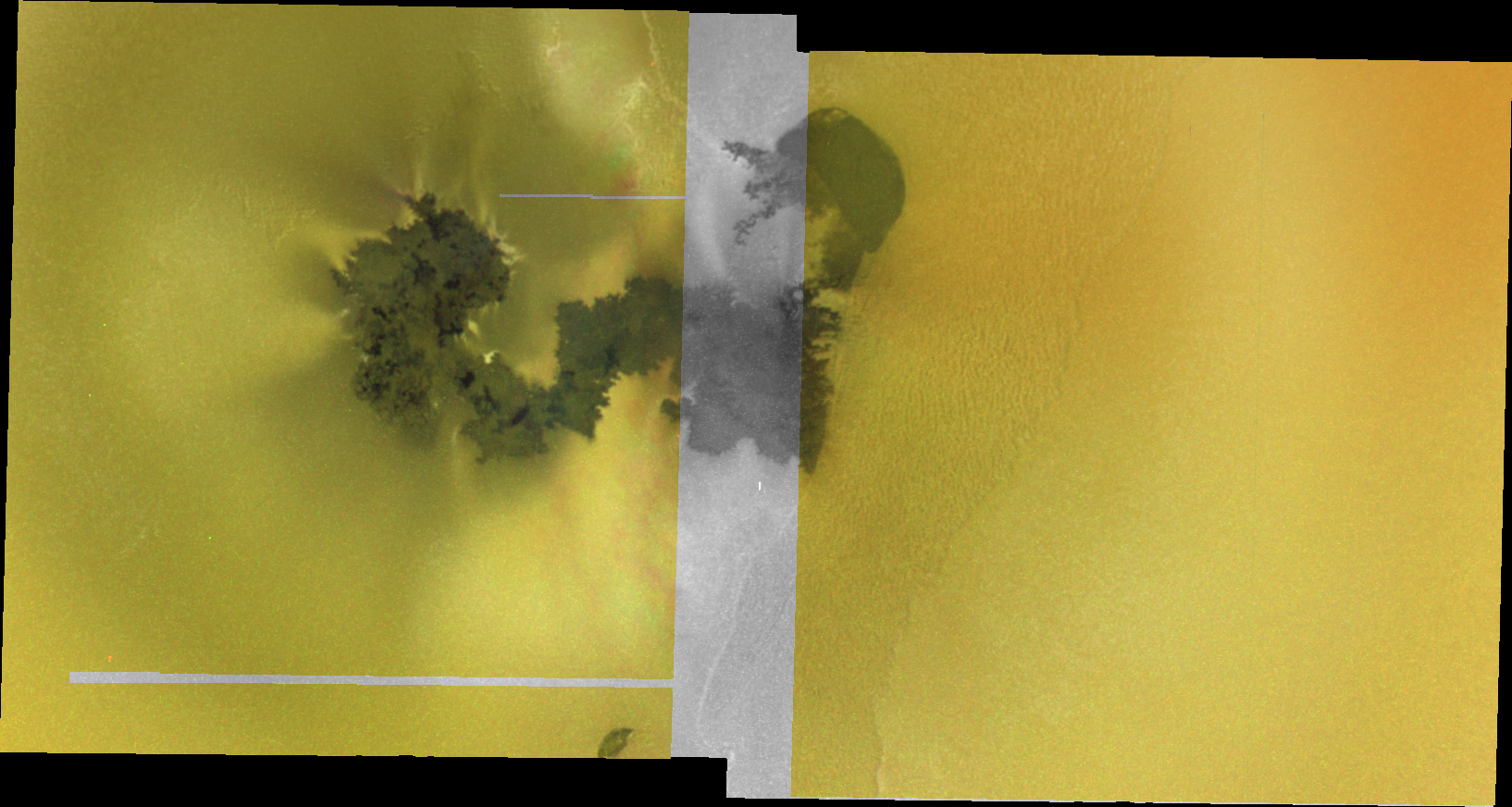
Galileo color mosaic of the volcano Prometheus and its eruption plumes. Prometheus Patera is the kidney-shaped dark region at upper right; the magma source vent is situated in the narrow "neck" directly below it. From the latter, the western flow field stretches to the left, with most of the SO_{2} plumes being erupted from the flow margins at the left end.

Prometheus is an active volcano on Jupiter's moon Io. It is located on Io's hemisphere facing away from Jupiter at 1.52°S 153.94°W.

== Description ==
Prometheus consists of a 28-kilometer-wide (17 mi) volcanic pit named Prometheus Patera and a 100-kilometer-long (62 mi) compound lava flow, all surrounded by reddish sulfur and circular, bright sulfur dioxide (SO_{2}) volcanic plume deposits. The volcano was first observed in images acquired by the Voyager 1 spacecraft in March 1979. Later that year, the International Astronomical Union named this feature after a Greek fire god, Prometheus.

Prometheus is the site of a volcanic eruption that has been ongoing since at least the Voyager 1 encounter in 1979. Between the Voyager encounters and the first observations by Galileo, a 6,700-square-kilometer (2,600 sq mi) flow field was emplaced. Later Galileo observations of this flow field revealed numerous small breakouts, particularly on the western end of the flow field.

Prometheus is the site of two volcanic eruption plumes: a small, sulfur-rich plume erupting from the magma-source vent at the eastern end of the flow field and a 75-to-100-kilometer-tall (47 to 62 mi), SO_{2}-rich dust plume erupting from the active flow front at the other end. The former forms a diffuse, red deposit to the east of the Prometheus flow field. The latter forms a bright, circular deposit surrounding the entire volcano and lava flow. The SO_{2}-rich plume is generated as lava at the western end of the flow field covers sulfur dioxide frost, heating and vaporizing it. This is accomplished at multiple breakouts, generating gas and dust for the visible dust plume. Prometheus' plume has been observed by both Voyager spacecraft, Galileo, and New Horizons, at every appropriate imaging opportunity.

Juno JIRAM observations during orbit 55 (October 2023) identified two persistent thermal centres along the Prometheus flow field: one associated with the eastern vent area, corresponding to the plume location observed by Voyager, and one at the distal western terminus active during the Galileo era. The intermediate region connecting the two hot spots had cooled sufficiently to be thermally undetectable by 2023, indicating a contraction of surface activity relative to Galileo observations. JunoCam detected the plume vent at approximately 1.9°S, 154.2°W, representing an eastward shift back toward the Voyager-era plume location.
