= List of volcanic features on Io =

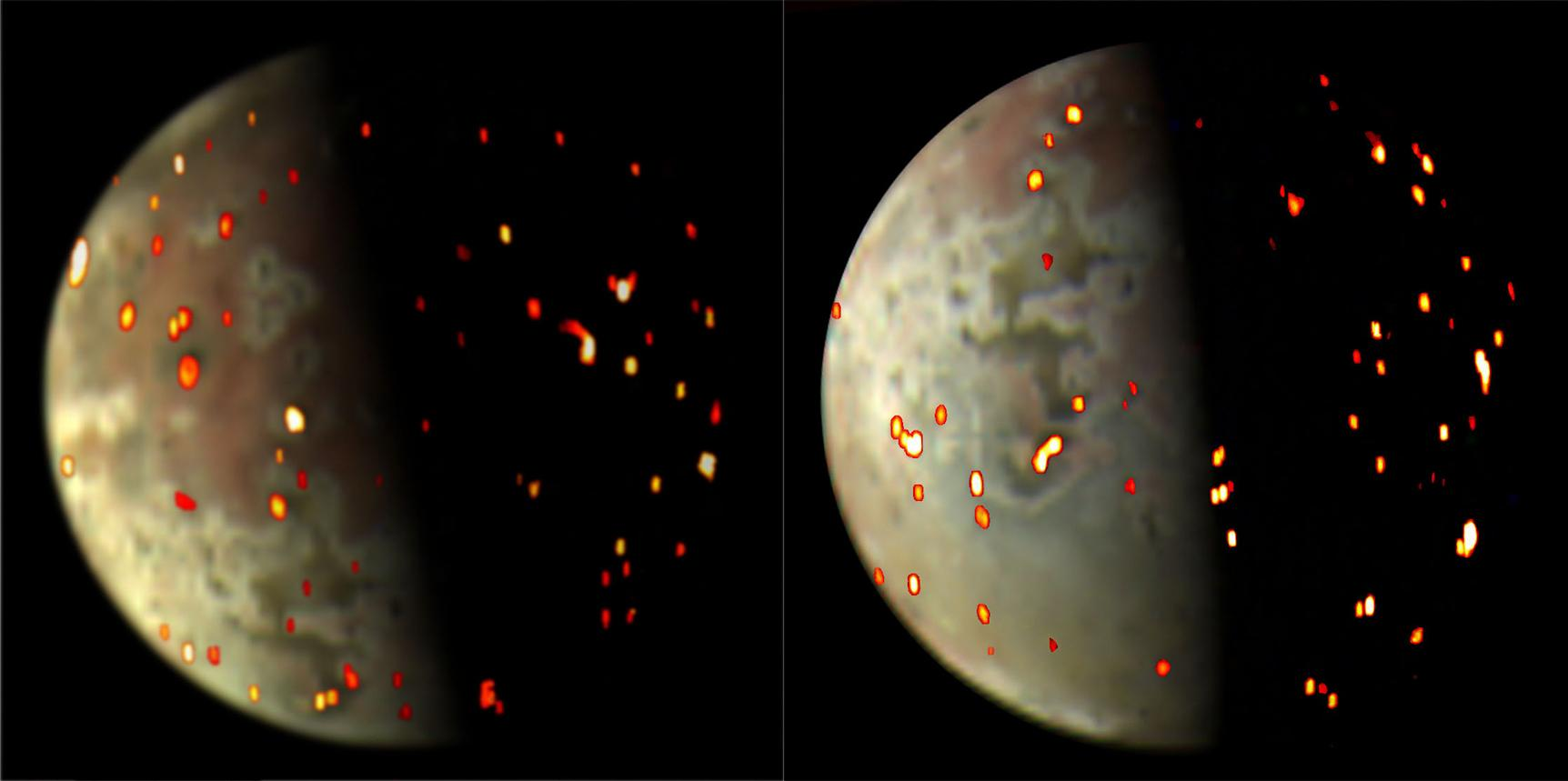
Jupiter moon Io volcanic activity (left: December 14, 2022; right: March 1, 2023)

This is a list of named volcanic surface features on Jupiter's moon Io. These names have been approved for use by the International Astronomical Union. The features listed below represent a subset of the total known volcanic features on Io's surface with the majority currently not having an officially approved name.

The names of volcanic features on Io use a combination of a name derived from mythological figures from around the world related to the Sun, fire, volcanoes, thunder, or smithing, places from the Greek mythological story of Io, Dante's Inferno, or from the name of a nearby feature on Io's surface and an approved descriptive term. The descriptive term used is based on the type of feature named and how it was first discovered. Volcanoes that were first observed as an active feature from observations of a volcanic plume fit under the category of "Eruptive Center" and do not use a descriptive term, though portions of these features may have also received names that do use a descriptive term, like Prometheus Patera or Masubi Fluctus. Lava flows use the descriptive term fluctus or the plural fluctūs, e.g. Acala Fluctus. Volcanic depressions use the term patera or the plural paterae, e.g. Ah Peku Patera. The term has also become the generic term for referring to these structures. Small shield volcanoes use the term tholus or the plural tholi, e.g. Inachus Tholus. Finally, channels carved by volcanic lava flows through thermal erosion use the term vallis or the plural valles.

See also the list of mountains on Io and the list of regions on Io.

== Eruptive centers ==
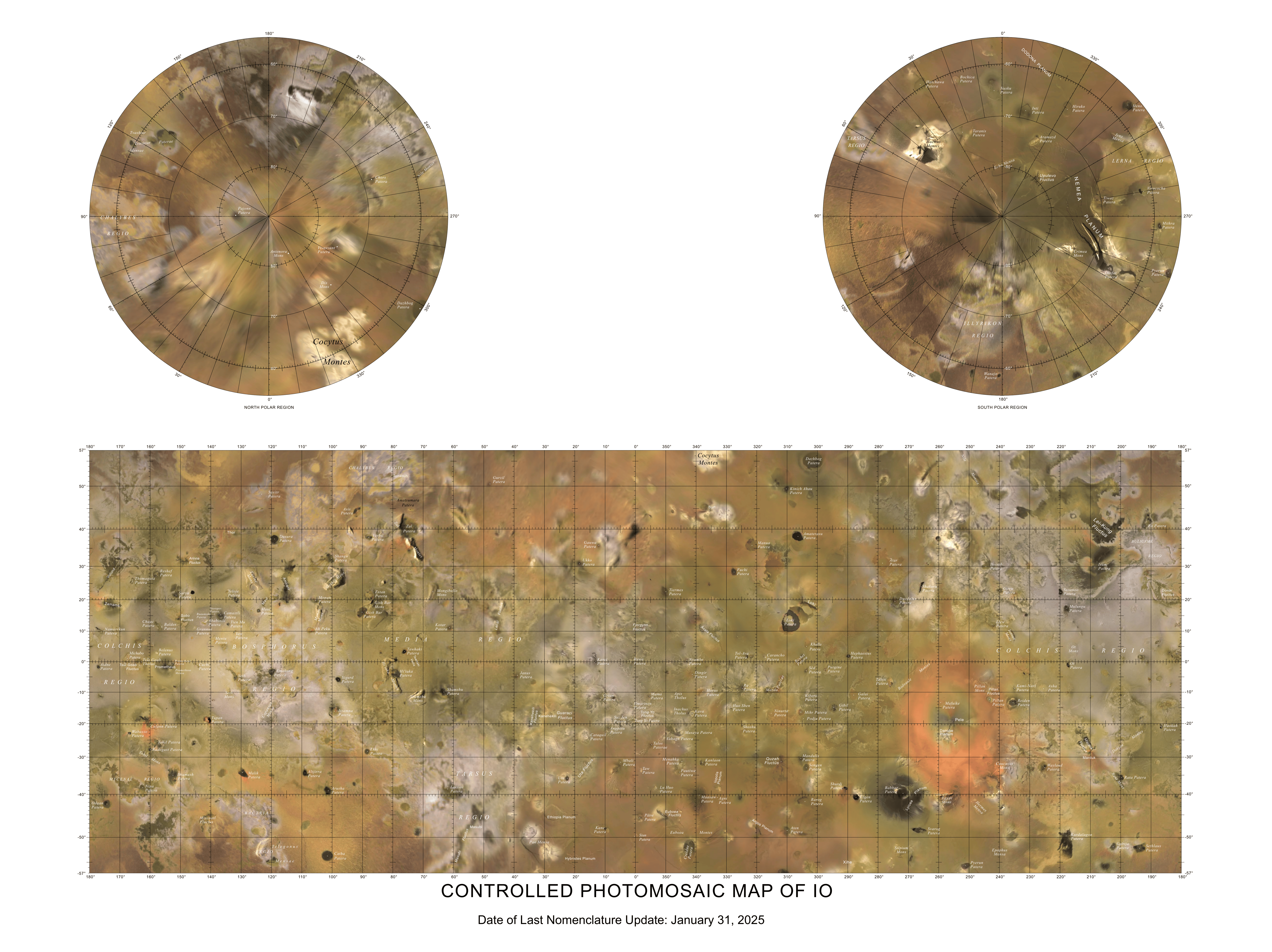
A complete map of Io's surface with labels.

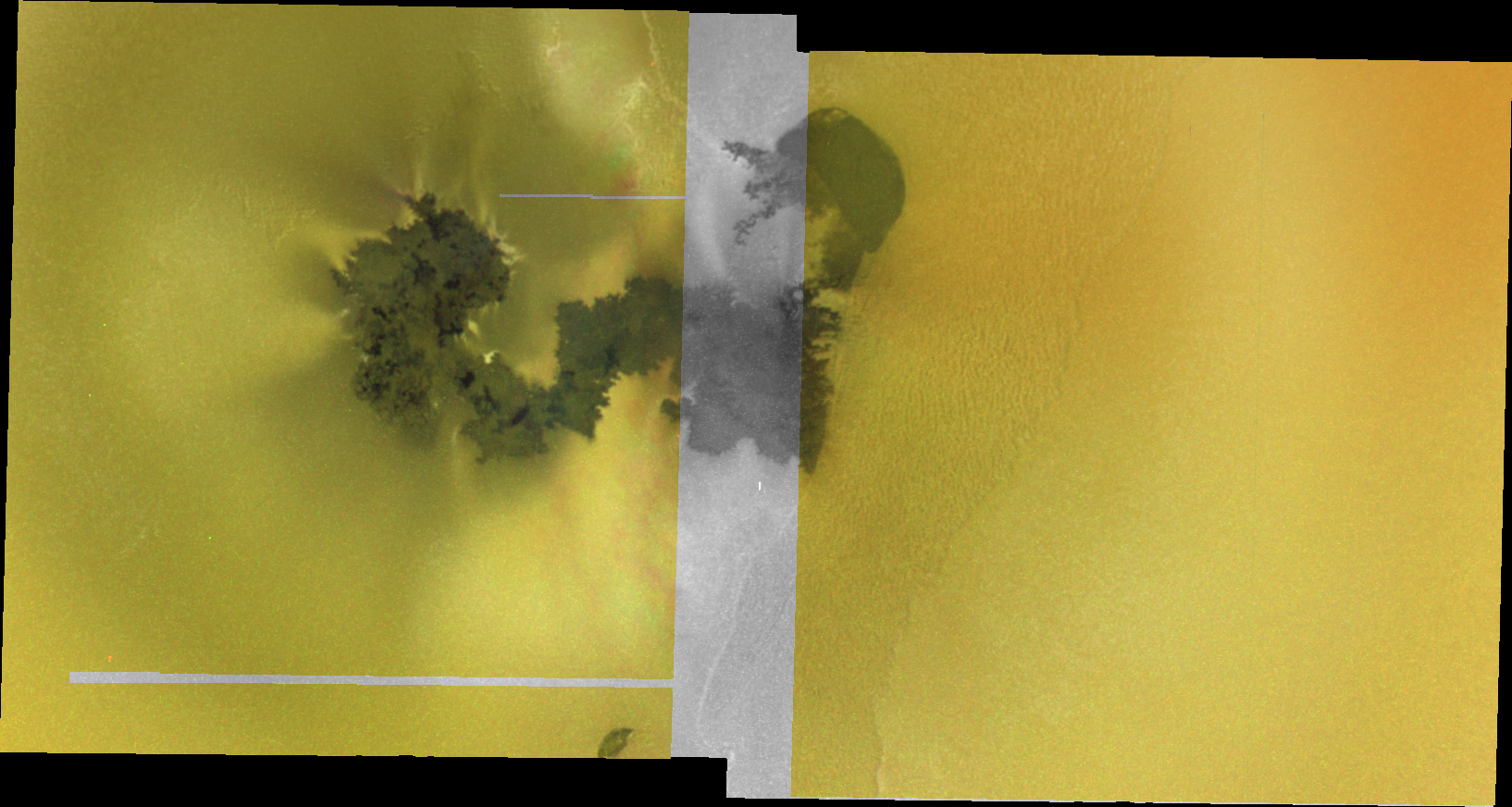
The Eruptive Center Prometheus

Eruptive centers on Io are locations typically where major volcanic activity was observed and characterized before the volcanic landform was. Coordinate, diameter, and name source come from the IAU's Solar System Nomenclature Website. All of these features have been observed as active volcanoes on Io.

Volcano	Named after	Coordinates
Amirani	Amirani (Georgian)	24.46°N 114.68°W
Kanehekili	Kāne Milohai (Hawaiian)	18.21°S 33.61°W
Loki	Loki (Norse)	18.22°N 302.56°W
Marduk	Marduk (Babylonian)	29.29°S 209.74°W
Masubi	Ho-Masubi (Japanese)	49.6°S 56.18°W
Maui	Māui (Hawaiian)	19.53°N 122.31°W
Pele	Pele (Hawaiian)	18.71°S 255.28°W
Prometheus	Prometheus (Greek)	1.52°S 153.94°W
Surt	Surtr (Icelandic)	45.21°N 336.49°W
Tonatiuh	Tonatiuh (Aztec)	52°N 77°W
Thor	Thor (Norse)	39.15°N 133.14°W
Volund	Völundr (Norse)	28.62°N 172.5°W
Xihe	Xihe (Chinese)	55°S 290°W
Zamama	Zamama (Sumerian)	18.43°N 172.59°W

== Paterae ==
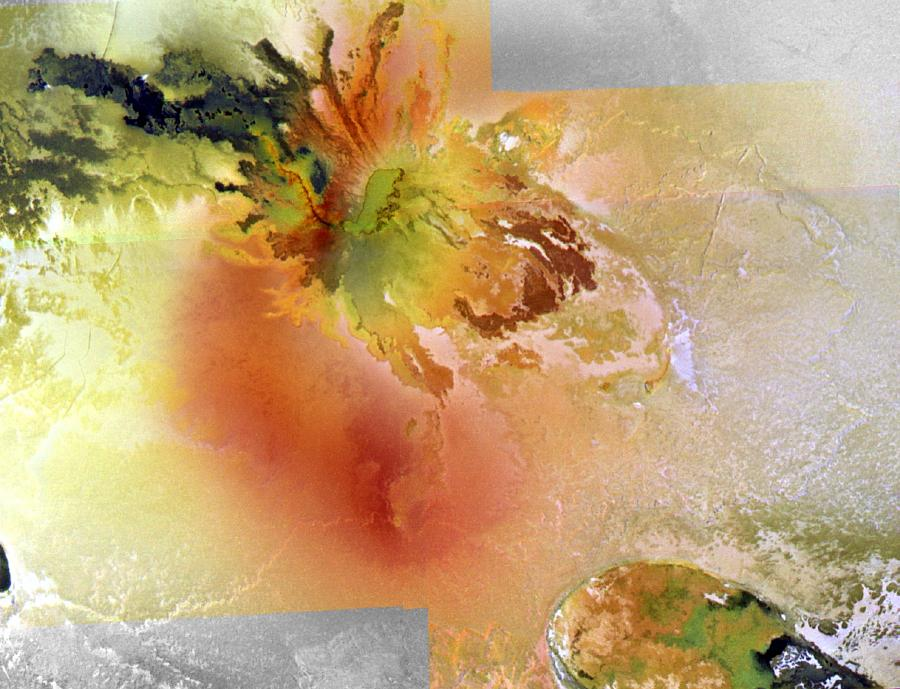
Culann Patera (greenish features above center) with associated lava flows and red volcanic plume deposits. Portions of Tohil Patera to the lower right.

The following table lists named volcanic depressions or paterae on Io. Coordinate, diameter, and name source come from the IAU's Solar System Nomenclature Website. Notes on whether the patera has been observed as an active volcano by either ground-based astronomers, the Hubble Space Telescope, or the various spacecraft that have encountered the Jupiter system come from the book, Volcanism on Io, unless otherwise noted.

In 2006, the use of the term catena /kəˈtiːnə/, for Ionian volcanoes with multiple depressions, was discontinued in favor of the plural paterae /ˈpætərə/. These features are Tvashtar Paterae, Reshet Paterae, and Mazda Paterae.

Patera	Named after	Coordinates	Diameter (km)	Activity Observed
Ababinili Patera	Ababinili (Chickasaw)	12.79°N 142.16°W	105.0	No
Agni Patera	Agni (Hindu and others)	40.8°S 333.05°W	19.7	No
Ah Peku Patera	Ah Peku (Mayan)	10.34°N 107.04°W	84.0	Yes
Aidne Patera	Aidne (Irish)	34.4°S 177.09°W	30.26	Yes
Altjirra Patera	Altjira (Australian Aboriginal)	1.78°S 108.97°W	52.55	Yes
Amaterasu Patera	Amaterasu (Japanese)	38.13°N 306.53°W	93.1	Yes
Angpetu Patera	Angpetu (Dakota)	21.15°S 8.79°W	13.68	No
Aramazd Patera	Aramazd (Armenian)	73.58°S 336.81°W	68.82	No
Arusha Patera	Arusha (Hindu)	39.06°S 101.48°W	68.07	Yes
Asha Patera	Asha (Zoroastrian)	8.84°S 225.69°W	108.33	Yes
Asis Patera	Asis (Nandi)	44.33°N 91.14°W	98.00	Yes
Ātar Patera	Atar (Zoroastrian)	31.1°N 278.58°W	86.41	Yes
Aten Patera	Aten (Egyptian)	48.53°S 310.02°W	43.4	Yes
Babbar Patera	Babbar (Sumerian)	39.79°S 271.98°W	85.74	Yes
Balder Patera	Balder (Norse)	11.44°N 156.1°W	42.0	No
Belenus Patera	Belenus (Celtic)	2.9°N 157.72°W	23.01	No
Bochica Patera	Bochica (Muisca)	61.5°S 18.85°W	52.38	No
Camaxtli Patera	Camaxtli (Aztec)	15.25°N 136.8°W	58.39	Yes
Carancho Patera	Carancho (Bolivian)	1.43°N 317.2°W	30.04	No
Cataquil Patera	Catequil (Inca)	23.89°S 16.57°W	133.95	No
Catha Patera	Cautha (Etruscan)	53.76°S 101.58°W	68.59	Yes
Chaac Patera	Chaac (Mayan)	11.88°N 157.44°W	95.88	Yes
Chors Patera	Chors (Slavic)	68.47°N 249.85°W	64.97	Yes
Creidne Patera	Creidhne (Celtic)	53.02°S 342.53°W	152.82	Yes
Cuchi Patera	Cuchi (Australian Aboriginal)	0.9°S 144.57°W	76.28	Yes
Culann Patera	Culann (Celtic)	20.22°S 160.17°W	54.48	Yes
Daedalus Patera	Daedalus (Greek)	19.52°N 274.35°W	73.29	Yes
Dazhbog Patera	Dazhbog (Slavic)	55.1°N 301.48°W	118.39	Yes
Dingir Patera	Dingir (Sumerian)	4.13°S 341.37°W	47.38	No
Dusura Patera	Dusura (Nabataean)	37.47°N 119.02°W	68.58	Yes
Ekhi Patera	Ekhi (Basque)	28.35°S 88.5°W	51.04	Yes
Emakong Patera	Emakong (Sulca people of New Britain)	3.33°S 119.82°W	80.08	Yes
Estan Patera	Estan (Hittite)	21.61°N 87.71°W	95.0	Yes
Fo Patera	Fo (Chinese)	40.79°N 192.25°W	47.15	Yes
Fuchi Patera	Kamuy Fuchi (Ainu)	28.34°N 327.57°W	63.67	Yes
Gabija Patera	Gabija (Lithuanian)	51.9°S 202.53°W	48.0	Yes
Galai Patera	Galai (Mongolis fire god)	10.87°S 288.11°W	105.23	No
Gauwa Patera	Gauwa (!Kung)	35.65°N 12.18°W	27.00	Yes
Gibil Patera	Gibil (Sumerian)	14.99°S 294.64°W	102.38	Yes?
Girru Patera	Girru (Babylonian)	22.8°N 239.92°W	68.23	Yes
Gish Bar Patera	Gish Bar (Babylonian)	16.18°N 90.26°W	122.25	Yes
Grannos Patera	Grannus (Celtic)	11.17°N 145.29°W	45.0	No
Grian Patera	Grian (Celtic)	11.84°S 11.98°W	70.0	Yes
Gurzil Patera	Gurzil (Berber)	50.40°N 48.26°W	51.00	Yes
Haokah Patera	Haokah (Lakota)	20.87°S 186.65°W	53.86	Yes
Hatchawa Patera	Hatchawa (Yaroro)	59.42°S 31.99°W	84.98	No
Heiseb Patera	Heiseb (Bushman)	29.79°N 244.85°W	62.48	No
Heno Patera	Heno (Iroquois)	57.14°S 311.47°W	71.06	Yes
Hephaestus Patera	Hephaestus (Greek)	1.95°N 289.79°W	38.84	Yes
Hiʻiaka Patera	Hiʻiaka (Hawaiian)	3.64°S 79.47°W	128.27	Yes
Hiruko Patera	Hiruko (Japanese)	65.09°S 328.83°W	89.54	No
Horus Patera	Horus (Egyptian)	9.82°S 338.0°W	144.21	No
Huo Shen Patera	Huo Shen (Chinese)	15.01°S 328.98°W	62.73	No
Ilmarinen Patera	Ilmarinen (Finnish)	14.44°S 1.15°W	45.94	No
Inti Patera	Inti (Inca)	68.37°S 347.52°W	70.91	No
Isum Patera	Isum (Assyrian)	29.82°N 208.46°W	62.24	Yes
Itzamna Patera	Itzamna (Mayan)	16.13°S 99.46°W	126.36	Yes
Janus Patera	Janus (Roman)	4.56°S 39.05°W	60.07	Yes
Kami-Nari Patera	Kami-Nari (Japanese)	8.7°S 235.08°W	53.39	No
Kane Patera	Kāne (Hawaiian)	48.39°S 11.77°W	135.77	No
Kanlaon Patera	Kan-Laon (Philippine)	31.06°S 337.96°W	94.0	Yes
Karei Patera	Karei (Semang people of the Malay Peninsula)	0.2°N 13.08°W	35.29	Yes
Kava Patera	Kava (mythology) (Persian)	16.83°S 341.33°W	63.82	No
Khalla Patera	Khalla (Bushman)	5.14°N 303.56°W	48.24	No
Kibero Patera	Kibero (Yaroro)	11.83°S 305.11°W	63.13	No
Kinich Ahau Patera	Kinich Ahau (Mayan)	49.34°N 310.2°W	45.21	Yes
Kotar Patera	Kothar-wa-Khasis (Ugaritic)	11.18°N 61.37°W	67.00	Yes
Kurdalagon Patera	Kurdalagon (Ossetian)	49.61°S 217.99°W	28.15	Yes
Laki-oi Patera	Laki-oi (Kayan people of Borneo)	38.94°S 61.93°W	105.16	No
Llew Patera	Llew (Celtic)	12.16°N 242.31°W	78.0	Yes
Loki Patera	Loki (Norse)	12.97°N 308.8°W	227.79	Yes
Lu Huo Patera	Lu Huo (Chinese)	38.52°S 353.17°W	63.95	No
Maasaw Patera	Masau'u (Hopi)	40.28°S 339.09°W	43.99	No
Mafuike Patera	Mahu-ike (Polynesian)	13.52°S 259.47°W	148.32	No
Malik Patera	Malik (Babylonian and Canaanite)	34.15°S 129.59°W	121.68	Yes
Mama Patera	Mama (Chibchan people of Central America)	11.28°S 355.31°W	15.72	No
Mandulis Patera	Mandulis (Kushite)	30.42°S 305.52°W	37.00	Yes
Manua Patera	Manua (Hawaiian)	35.78°N 321.73°W	110.51	Yes
Masaya Patera	Masaya (Nicaraguan)	22.62°S 344.49°W	55.09	No
Maui Patera	Māui (Hawaiian)	16.61°N 124.25°W	37.84	Yes
Mazda Paterae	Ahura Mazda (Zoroastrian)	8.81°S 313.28°W	240.78	Yes
Mbali Patera	Mbali (Pygmy)	31.5°S 5.06°W	40.7	Yes
Menahka Patera	Menahka (Mandan) people of North America)	31.31°S 344.75°W	9.15	No
Mentu Patera	Mentu (Egyptian)	7.0°N 139.36°W	103.0	No
Michabo Patera	Michabo (Algonquian peoples of North America)	1.2°N 167.6°W	104.0	Yes
Mihr Patera	Mihr (Armenian)	16.51°S 305.45°W	61.72	Yes
Mithra Patera	Mithra (Zoroastrian)	59.0°S 266.46°W	33.78	Yes
Monan Patera	a god of the Tupí-Guaraní (Brazil)	19.72°N 105.39°W	112.89	Yes
Mulungu Patera	Mulungu (East African)	17.26°N 217.87°W	62.48	Yes
Namarrkun Patera	Namarrkun (Australian Aboriginal)	10.06°N 175.52°W	16.69	No
Nina Patera	Nina (Inca)	38.24°S 162.6°W	52.07	No
Nunurta Patera	Ninurta (Sumerian and Akkadian)	16.74°S 315.25°W	82.34	No
Nusku Patera	Nusku (Assyrian)	65.01°S 3.82°W	124.31	Yes
Nyambe Patera	Nyambe (Zambezi)	0.38°N 343.11°W	58.15	No
Odqan Patera	Odqan (Mongol)	42.33°S 174.36°W	86	Yes
Olafat Patera	Olafat (Caroline Islands)	62.66°S 244.39°W	119	Yes
Ot Patera	Ot Ene (Mongol)	1.1°N 217.4°W	52.26	Yes
Päive Patera	Päive (Sami)	45.71°S 358.54°W	59.05	No
Päive Patera	Päive (Sami)	45.71°S 358.54°W	59.05	Yes
Pajonn Patera	Pajonn (Sami)	45.71°S 358.54°W	59.05	Yes
Pautiwa Patera	Pautiwa (Hopi)	34.2°S 345.59°W	6.62	No
Pillan Patera	Pillan (Mapuche people of South America)	12.34°S 243.25°W	73.43	Yes
Podja Patera	Podja (Evenk people of Russia and China)	18.41°S 304.74°W	67.03	No
Prometheus Patera	Prometheus (Greek)	0.62°S 152.45°W	73.43	Yes
Purgine Patera	Purgine (Mordvin people of Russia)	2.61°S 297.3°W	35.74	No
Pyerun Patera	Perun (Slavic)	55.64°S 251.21°W	52.18	Yes
Ra Patera	Ra (Egyptian)	8.66°S 324.7°W	39.11	Yes
Radegast Patera	Radegast (Slavic)	27.78°S 159.98°W	27.11	Yes
Rarog Patera	Rarog (Slavic)	41.71°S 304.41°W	104.35	Yes
Rata Patera	Rātā (Māori)	35.61°S 199.78°W	46.31	Yes
Reiden Patera	Reiden (Japanese)	13.4°S 235.45°W	73.26	Yes
Reshef Patera	Reshef (Phoenician)	27.69°N 158.06°W	62.0	No
Reshet Paterae	Reshet (Aramaic)	0.53°S 305.48°W	148.34	No
Ruaumoko Patera	Ruaumoko (Māori)	14.72°N 139.74°W	19.0	Yes
Ruwa Patera	Ruwa (East African)	0.19°N 1.75°W	62.44	Yes
Savitr Patera	Savitr (Hindu)	48.19°N 123.36°W	92.48	No
Sêd Patera	Sêd (Phoenician)	2.91°S 303.57°W	52.1	No
Sengen Patera	Sengen (Japanese)	32.89°S 303.73°W	63.64	Yes
Seth Patera	Seth (Egyptian)	5.35°S 131.67°W	59.82	Yes
Sethlaus Patera	Sethlans (Etruscan)	52.29°S 193.83°W	78.57	Yes
Shakuru Patera	Shakuru (Pawnee people of North America)	24.12°S 265.74°W	105.01	Yes
Shamash Patera	Shamash (Babylonian and Assyrian)	34.99°S 152.59°W	205.3	Yes
Shamshu Patera	Shamshu (Arabian)	10.07°S 62.97°W	96.36	Yes
Shango Patera	Shango (Yorùbá)	32.35°N 100.52°W	90.22	Yes
Shoshu Patera	Shoshu (Caucasian)	20.36°S 324.67°W	13.08	No
Shurdi Patera	Shurdh (Albanian)	38.47°S 290.74°W	13.08	Yes
Sigurd Patera	Sigurd (Norse)	5.94°S 97.93°W	68.6	Yes
Siun Patera	Siun (Nanai people of Siberia)	49.84°S 0.44°W	52.5	No
Steropes Patera	Steropes (Greek)	15.54°N 138.85°W	20.0	No
Sui Jen Patera	Sui Jen (Chinese)	19.1°S 2.65°W	33.78	No
Surya Patera	Surya (Hindu)	21.47°S 151.59°W	49.81	Yes
Susanoo Patera	Susanoo (Japanese)	22.39°N 219.8°W	58.41	Yes
Svarog Patera	Svarog (Slavic)	48.66°S 265.74°W	124.03	Yes
Tabiti Patera	Tabiti (Scythian)	6.75°S 275.90°W	103	Yes
Talos Patera	Talos (Greek)	26.39°S 354.75°W	24.67	No
Taranis Patera	Taranis (Celtic)	71.37°S 25.53°W	130.67	No
Taw Patera	Taw (Monguor)	33.65°S 358.37°W	4.74	No
Tawhaki Patera	Tawhaki (Maori)	3.32°N 76.18°W	49.85	Yes
Thomagata Patera	Thomagata (Muisca)	25.67°N 165.94°W	59.0	No
Tien Mu Patera	Tien Mu (Chinese)	12.31°N 134.3°W	28.0	Yes
Tiermes Patera	Tiermes (Sami)	22.38°N 349.95°W	79.76	Yes
Tiwaz Patera	Tiwaz (Luwian)	70.44°S 279.75°W	78	Yes
Tohil Patera	Tohil (Mayan)	25.63°S 158.66°W	76.59	No
Tol-Ava Patera	Tol-Ava (Mordvin people of Russia)	1.8°N 322.14°W	84.53	No
Tung Yo Patera	Tung Yo (Chinese)	18.27°S 0.93°W	59.68	No
Tupan Patera	the thunder god Tupan of the Tupí-Guaraní people of Brazil	18.73°S 141.13°W	79.13	Yes
Tvashtar Paterae	Tvashtri (Hindu)	62.76°N 123.53°W	306.19	Yes
Ukko Patera	Ukko (Finnish)	30.95°N 18.41°W	35.25	Yes
Ülgen Patera	Ülgen (Siberian)	40.85°S 287.31°W	43.89	Yes
Uta Patera	Utu (Sumerian)	35.86°S 22.4°W	43.89	Yes
Vahagn Patera	Vahagn (Armenian)	24.11°S 350.75°W	99.6	No
Verbti Patera	Verbt (Albanian)	37.99°N 87.92°W	62.00	Yes
Viracocha Patera	Viracocha (Inca)	61.77°S 280.09°W	59.3	Yes
Vivasvant Patera	Vivasvant (Hindu)	75.14°N 293.98°W	83.19	Yes
Wabasso Patera	Wabasso (Potawatomi people of North America)	22.9°S 166.7°W	32.0	No
Wanajo Patera	Wanajo (Louisiade Archipelago)	58.75°S 178.87°W	24.0	Yes
Wayland Patera	Wayland the Smith (Germanic)	32.8°S 225.23°W	63.37	Yes
Yaw Patera	Yaw (Hebrew)	9.9°N 132.2°W	39.0	Yes
Yeloje Patera	Yeloje (Yukaghir)	20.10°N 132.40°W	107.00	Yes
Zal Patera	Zal (Persian)	40.25°N 74.5°W	165.94	Yes

== Lava flows ==
Ionian fluctūs (areas of lava flow) are named after fire and thunder gods in various mythologies, or after locations in Greek mythology associated with Io. Coordinate, length, and name source come from the IAU's Solar System Nomenclature Website. Notes on whether the lava flow has been observed as part of an active volcano by either ground-based astronomers, the Hubble Space Telescope, or the various spacecraft that have encountered the Jupiter system come from the book, Volcanism on Io, unless otherwise noted.

Fluctus	Named after	Coordinates	Length	Activity Observed
Acala Fluctus	Acala (Buddhism)	8.97°N 334.59°W	411.11 km	Yes
Arinna Fluctus	Arinna (Hittite)	31.24°N 149.16°W	121.94 km	Yes
Donar Fluctus	Donar (Germanic)	22.67°N 187.63°W	222.47 km	Yes
Euboea Fluctūs	Euboea (Greek)	45.01°S 350.96°W	104.82 km	No
Fjorgynn Fluctus	Fjorgyn (Norse)	11.23°N 358.08°W	414.07 km	Yes
Kanehekili Fluctus	Kāne Milohai (Hawaiian)	17.68°S 33.56°W	243.47 km	Yes
Lei-Kung Fluctus	Lei Gong (Chinese)	40.4°N 206.47°W	386.17 km	Yes
Lei-zi Fluctus	Leizi (Chinese)	14.25°N 46.16°W	361.1 km	No
Marduk Fluctus	Marduk (Sumerian)	27.59°S 210.83°W	169.43 km	Yes
Masubi Fluctus	Ho-Masubi (Japanese)	50.49°S 58.13°W	501.33 km	Yes
Mixcoatl Fluctus	Mixcoatl (Aztec)	46.32°S 141.15°W	246.0 km	Yes
Quzah Fluctūs	Quzah (Arabian)	31.76°S 311.57°W	189.0 km	Yes
Sobo Fluctus	Sobo (Vodou)	14.08°N 150.59°W	58.83 km	Yes
Tsũi Goab Fluctus	Tsui (Khoikhoi)	1.4°S 163.4°W	117.0 km	Yes
Tung Yo Fluctus	Tung Yo (Chinese)	16.6°S 356.49°W	459.37 km	No
Upulevo Fluctus	Upulevo (Timorese)	79.88°S 314.92°W	113.0 km	Yes
Uta Fluctus	Utu (Sumerian)	33.05°S 16.65°W	332.31 km	No

== Shield volcanoes ==
Ionian shield volcanoes or tholi are named after mythological figures associated with fire or with the nymph Io.

Tholus	Named after	Coordinates	Length	Height
Apis Tholus	Apis (Greek)	10.9°S 347.88°W	145.71 km	N/A
Inachus Tholus	Inachus (Greek)	16.18°S 347.76°W	176.96 km	1.8 km
Tsũi Goab Tholus	Tsui (Khoikhoi)	0.1°S 163.0°W	53.0 km	0.8 km

== Lava channels ==
Ionian lava channels that cut into the surrounding terrain use the term vallis.

Vallis	Named after	Coordinates	Length
Tawhaki Vallis	Tawhaki (Maori)	0.5°N 72.8°W	190.0 kilometer (km)
