= Shango Patera =

Complex crater with scalloped edges on Jupiter's moon Io

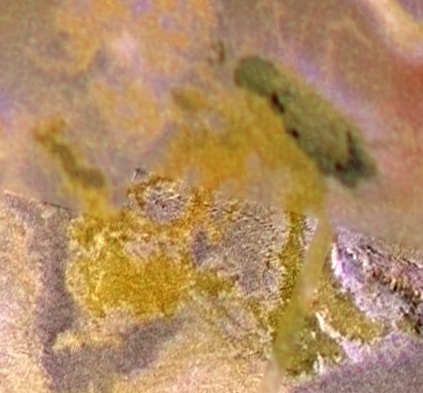
Highest resolution image of Shango Patera, acquired by Galileo during an encounter with Io in October 1999 and July 1999

Shango Patera is a patera, or a complex crater with scalloped edges, on Jupiter's moon Io. It is about 90 kilometers in diameter and is located at 32.35°N 100.52°W. It is named after the Yoruba thunder god Shango. Its name was approved by the International Astronomical Union in 2000. It is located north of Skythia Mons. To the southwest is the eruptive center Amirani, and to the southeast are Gish Bar Patera, Gish Bar Mons, and Estan Patera.

Shango was the site of a major surface change between 2001 and 2007. The floor of Shango Patera and the flows to the southwest of Shango had darkened considerably between the end of the Galileo mission and the New Horizons flyby in February 2007.
