= Maui Patera =

Complex crater with scalloped edges on Jupiter's moon Io

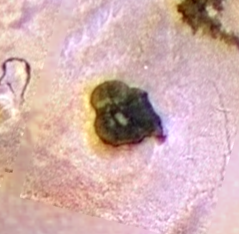
Highest resolution image of Maui Patera, acquired by Galileo during an encounter with Io in October 1999

Maui Patera is a patera, or a complex crater with scalloped edges, on Jupiter's moon Io. It is about 38 kilometers in diameter and is located at 16.61°N 124.23°W. It is named after Māui, a Hawaiian demigod that sought fire from Mafuike. Its name was approved by the International Astronomical Union in 1979. It is located southwest of the eruptive center Maui, south of Euxine Mons, and southwest of the volcano Amirani. Due east are Monan Patera, Monan Mons, and Ah Peku Patera.
