= List of planetary features with Māori names =

In the International Astronomical Union's system of unique feature names for topographic and albedo features on planets and moons in the Solar System, many are named in the language of the indigenous Māori people of New Zealand. These names are primarily from Māori mythology.

== Venus ==
Features on the planet Venus are named for women and goddesses. Colles are small hills or knobs, named after sea goddesses. Coronae are oval features of uncertain origin, named for fertility and earth goddesses. Planitiae, low plains, are mythological heroines. Tholi, small dome-like hills, are named for (miscellaneous) goddesses. Valles, valleys, are named according to their length: if more than 400 km, after the word for the planet in various world languages, otherwise after river goddesses.

The hero Māui stole fire from the fingernails of his grandparent Mahuika.

- Apakura Tholus: goddess of justice.
- Hinemoa Planitia: heroine who swam across Lake Rotorua to her waiting lover Tutanekai.
- Mahuea Tholus: fire goddess; normally spelt Mahuika.
- Pani Corona: fertility goddess.
- Paoro Tholi: goddess of echoes; in the lore of the Ngāti Hau iwi, she gave voice to the first woman, Mārikoriko.
- Tawera Vallis: Māori name for Venus, though not the more common one.
- Urutonga Colles: sea goddess, mother of Tāwhaki. Urutonga is a deity associated with the Ngāi Tahu iwi.
- Whatitiri Corona: ancestral goddess; goddess of thunder, also known as Whaitiri.

Craters on Venus that have diameters less than 20 km are named with common female first names:

- Karo crater: first name.
- Ngaio crater: first name, /ˈnaɪ.oʊ/; e.g. writer and theatre director Dame Ngaio Marsh
- Puhioia crater: first name.

== Asteroids ==
- 3400 Aotearoa: the Māori language name for New Zealand.
- 3810 Aoraki: New Zealand's highest mountain

=== 433 Eros ===
- Tutanekai Crater: Hinemoa's lover in Rotorua.

== Io ==
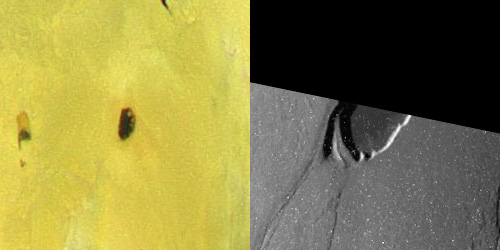
Highest resolution images of Tawhaki Patera, taken by the Galileo spacecraft. Color image on the left acquired in July 1999. The gray scale image on the right taken in November 1999.

The innermost moon of Jupiter, Io is a world emblazoned with the reds, yellows, whites and blacks of sulphur chemistry and the scars of active volcanism. Its features have a wide variety of naming themes: gods, goddesses and heroes associated with fire, sun, thunder, and volcanoes; mythical blacksmiths; people associated with the myth of Io; or people from Dante's Inferno. Names may also be derived from a nearby, more prominent feature; this is a situation where the same name could be used for both a volcano and an adjacent valley.

Montes, mountains, can be named in the Dantean or Greek categories, or for associated features. Paterae, volcanic pits with flat floors and steep walls, are named from these first two groups, and include names from their associated eruptive center. Valles, valleys, are named for their associated feature.

- Rata Mons and Rata Patera: Rātā, a "sun hero" in the citation, is a grandson of Tāwhaki.
- Tawhaki Patera and Tawhaki Vallis: Tāwhaki, "god of lightning" in the citation, is a culture hero sometimes associated with lightning

== Titan ==
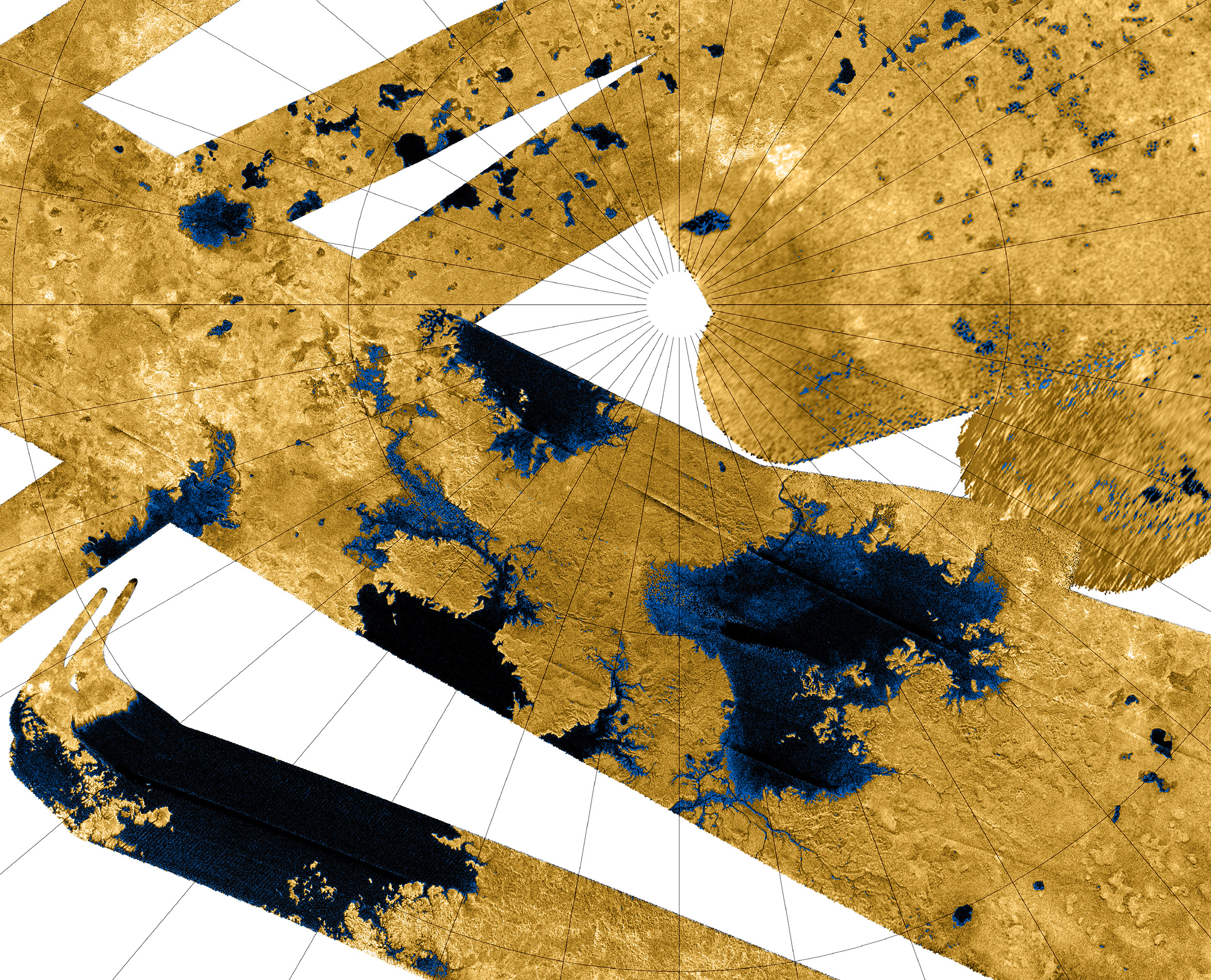
False-color Cassini synthetic aperture radar mosaic of Titan's north polar region. Blue coloring indicates low radar reflectivity areas, caused by seas of liquid ethane, methane and dissolved nitrogen. Punga Mare is just above center.

The largest moon of Saturn is a world in its own right: Titan has a dense atmosphere and complex weather system, with liquid-carved river networks and sizable seas.

Maria, seas, are large expanses of dark materials thought to be liquid hydrocarbons; they are named for sea creatures from myth and literature. Virgae, streaks or stripes of colour, are named for rain gods and goddesses.

- Punga Mare: son of the sea god Tangaroa; the father of sharks and lizards.
- Uanui Virgae: rain god; child of the storm god Tāwhirimātea.

== Triton ==
Neptune's largest moon is thought to be a captured Kuiper belt object, an interloper from further out in the Solar System. Triton's features are given aquatic names, excluding Roman and Greek references.

- Tangaroa Crater: god of the sea
