= Kinich Ahau Patera =

Complex crater with scalloped edges on Jupiter's moon Io

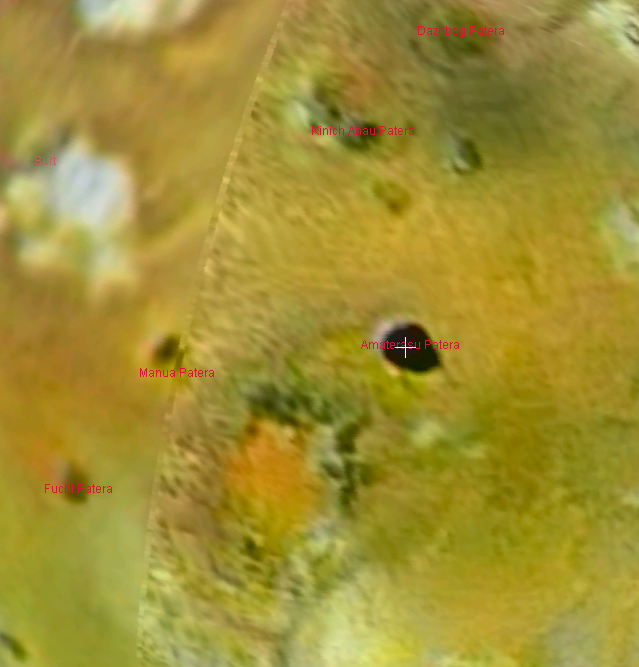
Kinich Ahau Patera, in a screenshot taken in NASA World Wind. Click to enlarge.

Kinich Ahau Patera is a patera, or a complex crater with scalloped edges, on Jupiter's moon Io. It is about 45 kilometers in diameter and is located at 49.35°N 310.25°W. It is named after the Mayan sun god Kinich Ahau. Dazhbog Patera is located northeast, Amaterasu Patera is located south-southeast, and Manua Patera can be found southwest.
