= Egypt Mons =

Mountain on Io

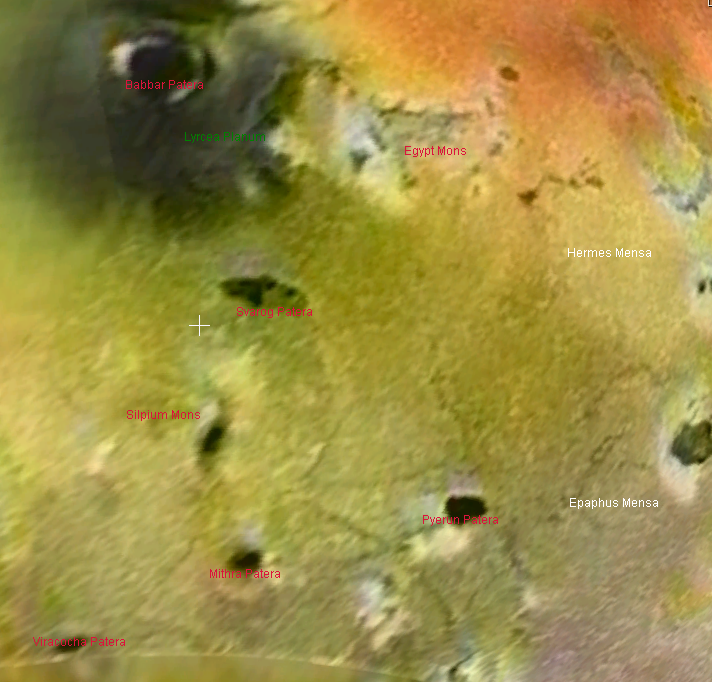
Egypt Mons, located near the top of a screenshot from NASA World Wind.

Egypt Mons is a mountain on Jupiter's moon Io. It is 10 kilometers in height, making it the 11th tallest mountain on Io, and taller than Mount Everest. Although the U.S. Geological Survey gives a diameter of 193.7 kilometers, the Io Mountain Database gives a length of 133.8 kilometers and a width of 146.0 kilometers. It is a Flatiron Massif mountain, meaning it has a rugged, irregular appearance and complex surface morphology. It is 9792 km^{2} in area and its center located at 41.49°S 257.6°W. It has a steep, north-facing scarp. Egypt Mons is named for Egypt, because that is the place where Io ended her wanderings in the mythology. Its name was adopted by the International Astronomical Union in 1997. To the northwest is Babbar Patera, and southeast is Hermes Mensa. Svarog Patera can be found to the southwest.
