= Pyerun Patera =

Complex crater with scalloped edges on Jupiter's moon Io

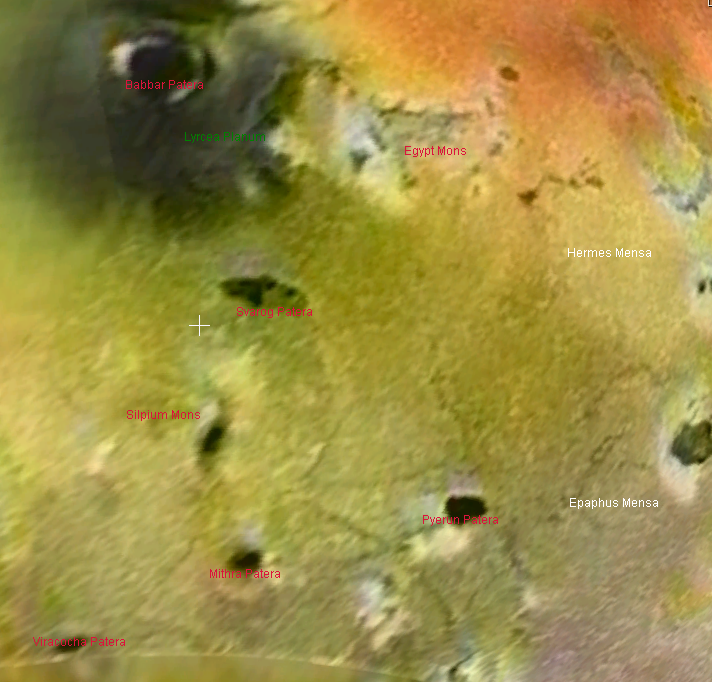
A screenshot of an area including Pyerun Patera, from NASA World Wind.

Pyerun Patera is a patera, or a complex crater with scalloped edges, on Jupiter's moon Io. It is about 57 kilometers in diameter and is located at 55.65°S 251.06°W. It is named after the Slavonic god of thunder, Pyerun. The name was adopted by the International Astronomical Union in 1985. West of Pyerun Patera is Mithra Patera, and to the east is the mesa Epaphus Mensa. To the northeast is Epaphus Mensa, and to the northwest are the mountain Silpium Mons and Svarog Patera.
