= Ah Peku Patera =

Complex crater with scalloped edges on Jupiter's moon Io

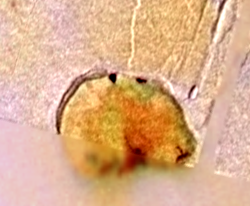
Highest resolution image of Ah Peku Patera, taken by Galileo during an encounter with Io in October 1999

Ah Peku Patera is a patera, or a complex crater with scalloped edges, on Jupiter's moon Io. It is 85 kilometers in diameter and is located at 10.3°N 107°W. It is named after the Mayan thunder god Ah Peku. Its name was adopted by the International Astronomical Union in 2006. Ah Peku Patera is located on the south end of Monan Mons, north of which is Monan Patera. The eruptive centers Amirani and Maui can be found northwest, as well as Maui Patera. Gish Bar Patera is located toward the northeast. Ah Peku Patera was first detected by the spacecraft Galileo's Solid State Imager and Near-Infrared Mapping Spectrometer. It is considered an active hot spot.
