= Amaterasu Patera =

Crater on Io

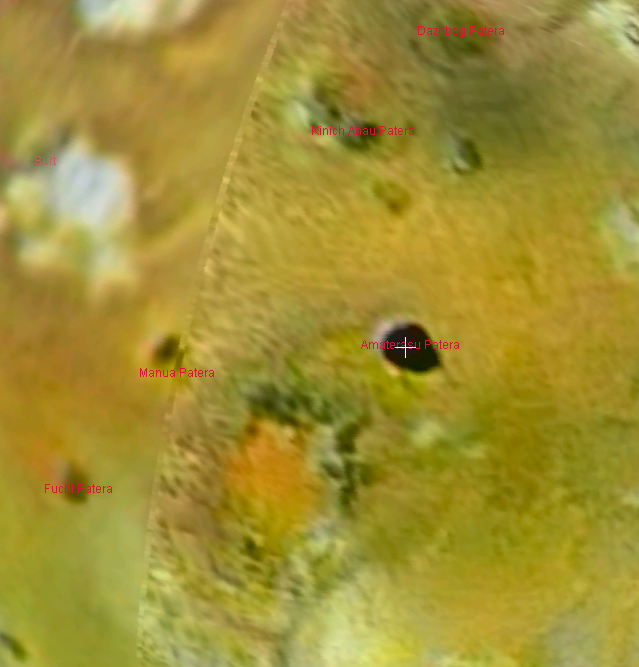
Amaterasu Patera, in a screenshot taken in NASA World Wind. Click to enlarge.

Amaterasu Patera is a patera, a complex crater with scalloped edges, on Jupiter's moon Io. It is one of the darkest features on Io, and the measurement of its thermal spectrum (its temperature was estimated in 1979 to be 281 K) helped to support an anticorrelation between albedo and temperature for Ionian hotspots. The feature has darkened further since the first orbit around Jupiter by the Galileo spacecraft.

Observations by the JIRAM instrument aboard Juno during orbits 51 (2023 May 16) and 55 (2023 October 15) revealed that Amaterasu Patera is an active lava lake, showing a characteristic ring of hot lava surrounding a cooler central crust in the first observation, and a warmer, more uniform surface in the second — a change consistent with a resurfacing event occurring in the intervening period. Analysis of the crust temperature suggests a resurfacing cycle shorter than one year, making Amaterasu one of the most dynamically active lava lakes identified on Io.

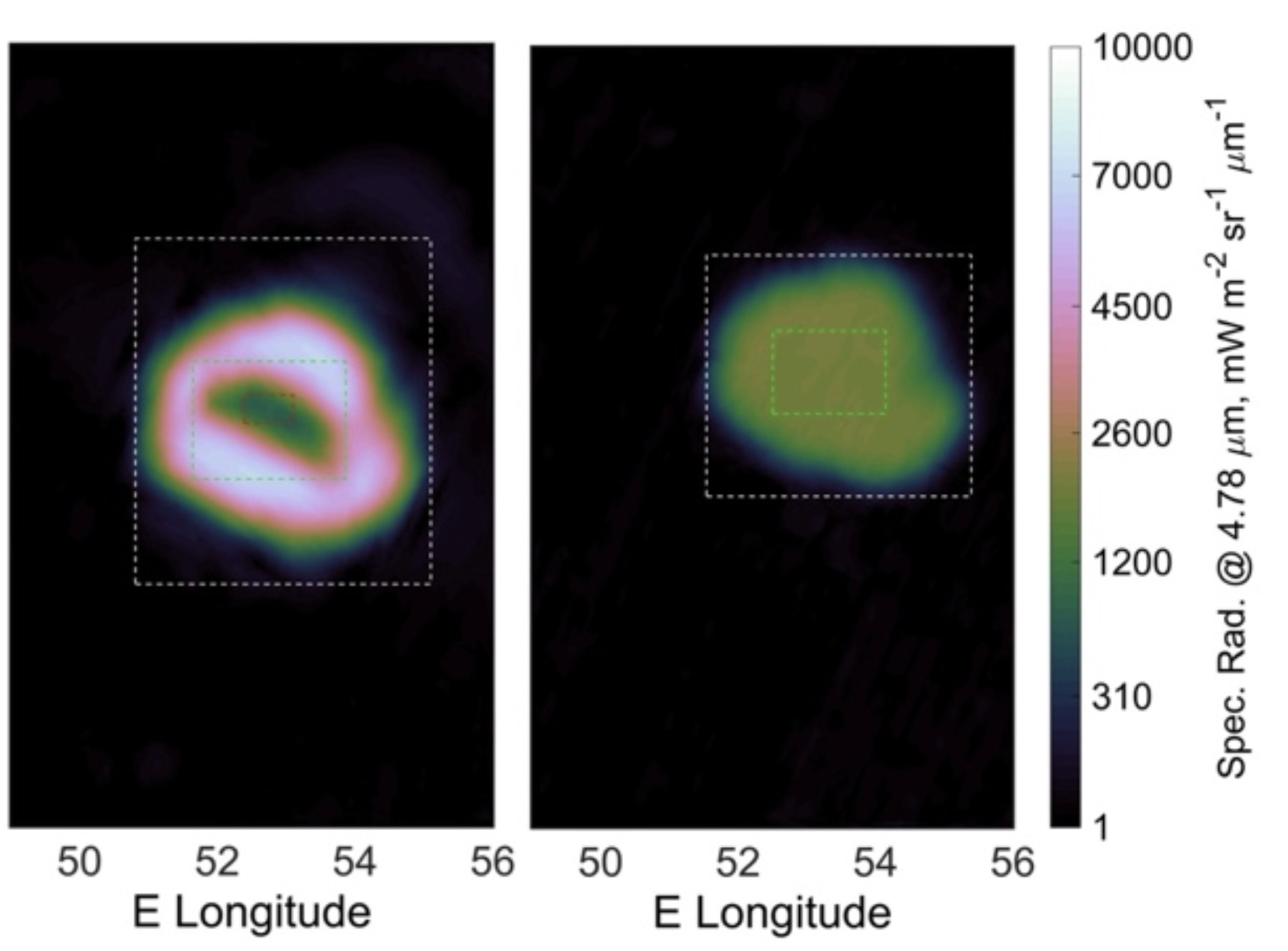
Amaterasu Patera observed by Juno/JIRAM in M band during Juno's orbit 51 (left) and 55 (right). The hot peripheral ring and cooler central crust are clearly visible. Credit: Mura et al. (2026), CC BY 4.0.

It is 100 kilometers in diameter and located at 38.1°N 306.5°W. It was named after the Japanese sun goddess Amaterasu. To the north are Kinich Ahau Patera and Dazhbog Patera, and to the west are Manua Patera and Fuchi Patera.
