= Pillan Patera =

Patera on Jupiter's moon Io

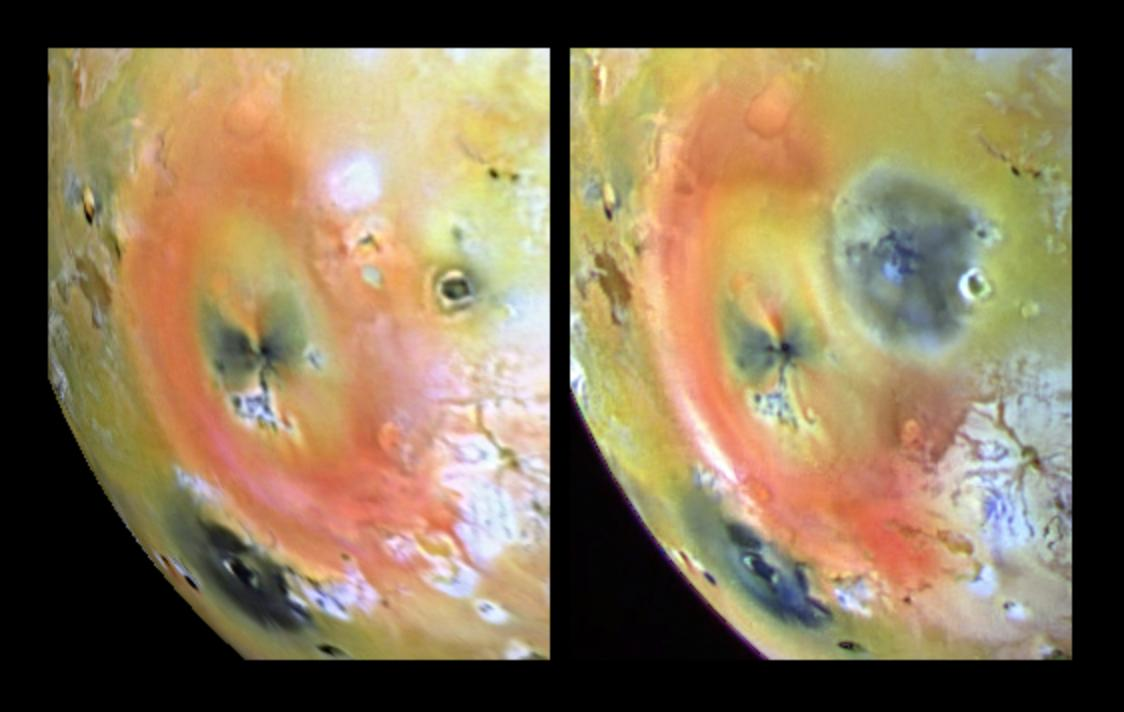
Two Galileo images showing surface changes from a major eruption at Pillan Patera in 1997

Pillan Patera is a patera, or a complex crater with scalloped edges, on Jupiter's moon Io. It is located at 12.34°S 243.25°W, south of Pillan Mons and west of Reiden Patera. It is named after the Araucanian thunder, fire, and volcano god. Its name was approved by the International Astronomical Union in 1997.

Pillan Patera is approximately 70 kilometers in diameter. In the summer of 1997, it erupted in an event now defined as "Pillanian" eruption style. At temperatures higher than 1,600 °C, (2912 °F) a 140 kilometer high plume eruption deposited dark pyroclastic materials rich in orthopyroxene over an area greater than 125,000 km^{2}. This was followed by the emplacement of over 3,100 km^{2} in dark flow-like material north of the caldera. The high temperature part of the eruption lasted from 52 to 167 days and between May and September 1997, with peak eruption temperatures around June 28, 1997.

The 1997 eruption was the largest effusive eruption ever witnessed. During a 100-day period, at least 31 km^{3} of lava were erupted, with 25 km^{3} shortly afterward. The eruption sheds light on emplacement of very large, voluminous flows millions of years ago on Mars and Earth. The highest effusion rates exceeded 10,000 cubic meters per second. The eruption produced a large, dark, deposit, 400 kilometers in diameter, which surrounds Pillan and partially covers a bright red ring left by the volcano Pele's plume. Since the eruption, the Pillan plume deposit has faded, coated by material from Pele and Kami-Nari Patera, a small volcano to the east of Pillan Patera.
