= Estan Patera =

Complex crater with scalloped edges on Jupiter's moon Io

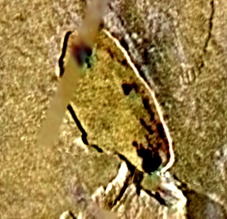
Highest resolution image of Estan Patera, acquired by Galileo during an encounter with Io in October 1999

Estan Patera is a patera, or a complex crater with scalloped edges, on Jupiter's moon Io. It is 95 kilometers in diameter and located at 21.53°N 87.59°W. It is named after the Hittite sun god Estan. Its name was adopted by the International Astronomical Union in 2006. It is located at the northern base of the 11-kilometer mountain Gish Bar Mons. Located west-northwest is Skythia Mons, and to the southwest is Monan Mons, at the northern and southern ends of which are Monan Patera and Ah Peku Patera.
