= Fuchi Patera =

Patera on Jupiter's moon Io

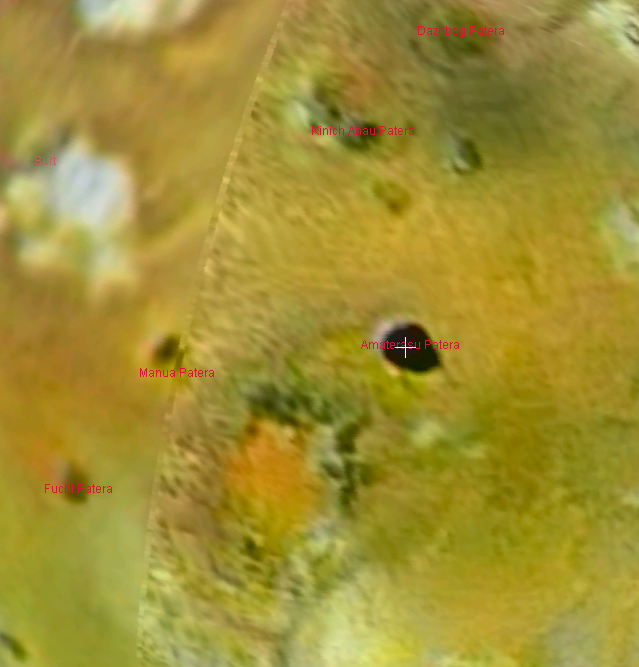
Fuchi Patera, in a screenshot taken in NASA World Wind. Click to enlarge.

Fuchi Patera is a patera, or a complex crater with scalloped edges, on Jupiter's moon Io. It is approximately 66 kilometers in diameter and is located at 28.4°N 327.6°W. It is named after the Ainu fire goddess, Kamuy Fuchi. Its name was adopted by the International Astronomical Union in 1979. Manua Patera is located north-northeast, and Amaterasu Patera is located northeast.
