= Viracocha Patera =

Complex crater with scalloped edges on Jupiter's moon Io

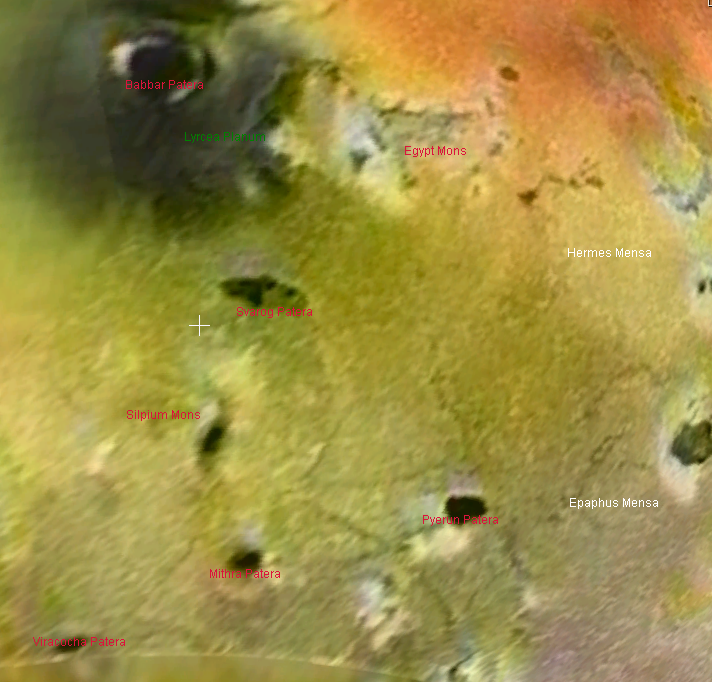
A screenshot of an area including Viracocha Patera, from NASA World Wind.

Viracocha Patera is a patera, or a complex crater with scalloped edges, on Jupiter's moon Io. It is about 61 kilometers in diameter and is located at 61.75°S 280.07°W. It is named after the Quechua creator god Viracocha. The name was adopted by the International Astronomical Union in 1979. Viracocha Patera is a Voyager spacecraft-detected hot spot. To Viracocha Patera's east-northeast is Mithra Patera, and to the northeast is the mountain Silpium Mons.
