= Asha Patera =

Complex crater with scalloped edges on Jupiter's moon Io

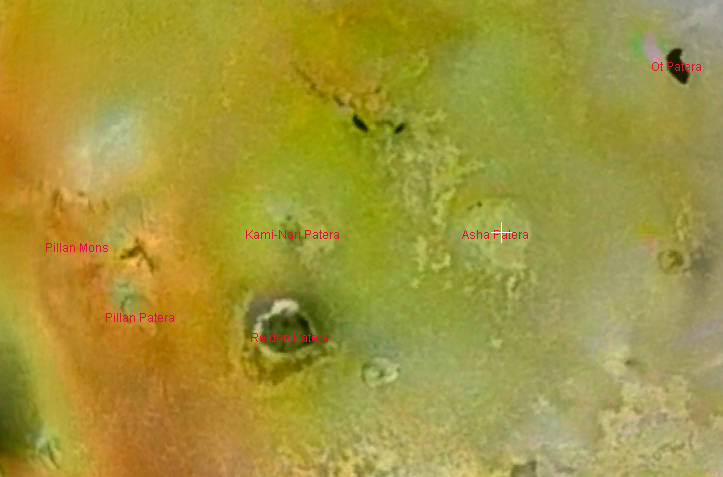
Asha Patera, in a screenshot taken in NASA World Wind. Click to enlarge.

Asha Patera is a patera, or a complex crater with scalloped edges, on Jupiter's moon Io. It is approximately 108 kilometers in diameter and located at 8.84°S 225.69°W. It is named after asha, the Zoroastrian principle of Truth. Its name was adopted by the International Astronomical Union in 1979. Reiden Patera and Kami-Nari Patera can both be found to the west.
