= Monan Patera =

Complex crater with scalloped edges on Jupiter's moon Io

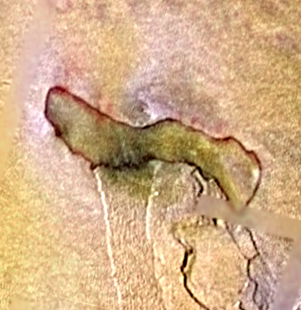
Highest resolution image of Monan Patera, acquired by Galileo during an encounter with Io in October 1999

Monan Patera is a patera, or a complex crater with scalloped edges, on Jupiter's moon Io. It is about 137 kilometers in diameter and is located at 19.82°N 104.81°W. It is named after Monan, a god in Brazilian mythology that destroyed the world with fire and floods. Its name was adopted by the International Astronomical Union in 1997.

Monan Patera forms an unusual worm-shaped depression at the north end of the elongate mountain Monan Mons, south of which is Ah Peku Patera. To the west is the eruptive center Amirani, and to the north is Skythia Mons. To the east are Gish Bar Patera, Gish Bar Mons, and Estan Patera. Monan Patera's similar north and south margins indicate it may have formed as a pull-apart basin and subsequently was filled with lava.
