= Venus snow =

Brightening of the radar reflection from the surface of Venus at high elevations

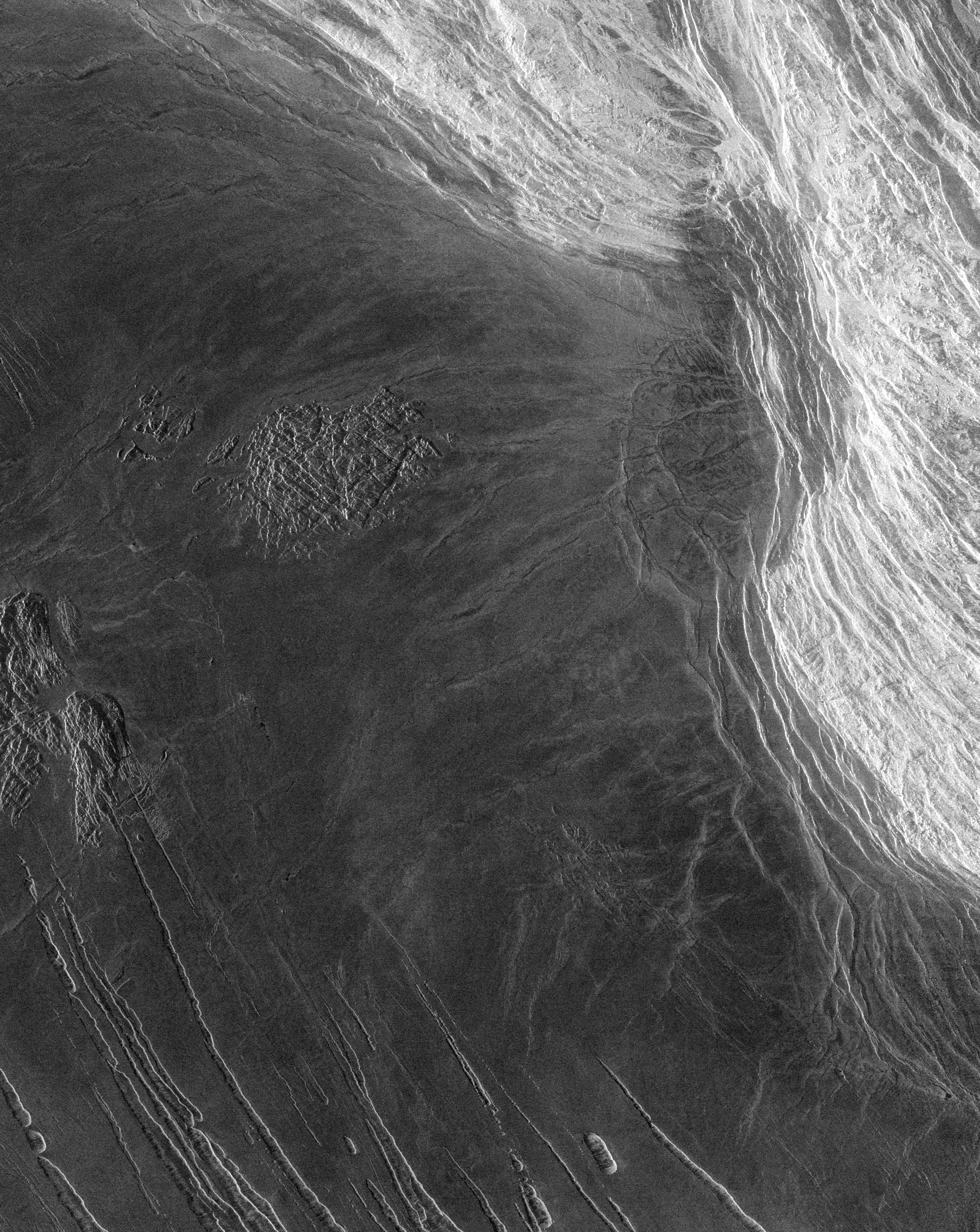
Lakshmi Planum (left) and Maxwell Montes (right) in a Magellan radar map. The highlands are covered in bright "snow," rising 5 km (3.1 mi) above the dark lava flows of the neighboring plain.

Venus snow is a brightening of the radar reflection from the surface of Venus at high elevations. The "snow" appears to be a mineral condensate of lead(II) sulfide and bismuth sulfide precipitated from the atmosphere at altitudes above 2,600 m (8,500 ft).

The nature of the "snow" was initially unknown. In radar images, smooth surfaces such as lava plains generally appear dark, while rough surfaces such as impact debris appear bright. The composition of the rock also alters the radar return: conductive material, or material with a high dielectric constant, appears brighter. It was therefore initially difficult to determine whether the high-altitude areas of Venus were different from the lowlands in chemical composition or in texture. Possible explanations included loose soil, different rates of weathering at high and low elevations, and chemical deposition at high elevation. It could not be water ice, which cannot exist in the extremely hot, dry conditions of the Venusian surface.

Data from the radar mapper on the Pioneer Venus orbiter suggested an explanation in terms of chemical composition. It was hypothesized that the underlying rock contained iron pyrite or other metallic inclusions that would be very reflective. At the high temperatures found on the surface of Venus, these minerals would gradually evaporate. Faster weathering at high elevation might continually expose new material, causing the highlands to appear brighter than lowlands. High-resolution radar observations by the Magellan probe by 1995 began to favor the hypothesis that metallic compounds sublimate in lower, warmer altitudes and deposit in higher, cooler areas. Candidates included tellurium, pyrite, and other metal sulfides.

== See also ==
- Atmosphere of Venus
- Geology of Venus
- Extraterrestrial sky
- Maxwell Montes
- Venera program
