= Mulungu =

Bantu deity

== In traditional Bantu cultures ==
=== Origin, diffusion, and etymology ===
The original early-Bantu name for the highest God of gods, creator and father of all gods, was probably Nyàmbé, possibly from the verb root -àmb-, "to begin". With the diversification of Bantu cultures, other names came about, with "Mulungu" emerging in the ancient Southern-Kaskazi group (about 6000 BC). The etymology of the name is disputed. One hypothesis is that the name is derived from a verb root -ng-, meaning "to be rectified", "to become right"; in this case, the original concept of Mulungu is that of a creator god that established the original, right order on the world.

=== Description ===
All traditional Bantu cultures have a notion of a "creator god", a concept which was already established in the Niger–Congo cultures. This creator god is usually seen as a remote deity, far and detached from men and living beings; in some cases, it is more of an impersonal "creating force" or a primum movens than a "God" in the usual sense of the word. Even when described as a personal god, the Creator is believed to be far and detached from men and living beings; this detachment is the subject of a number of Bantu myths describing how the creator left the Earth, moving to the sky, as a consequence of him being upset with men or annoyed by their activities. It is thus a common trait of Bantu religions that no prayers, and usually no worship, is actually directed to the creator; men interact with lower-levels gods and spirits that are closer and more interested in human affairs. These general lines are common to traditional concepts of Mulungu as found in Kikuyu, Ruvu, and other cultures. A Nyamwezi myth about the departure of Mulungu from the Earth involves Mulungu being upset of the fires set by men to the landscape, and asking the spider to weave a web for him to climb up to the sky.

== Modern uses ==
With the advent of either Islam or Christianity, the word "Mulungu" was usually adopted to mean the Christian or Islamic God. Over thirty translations of the Bible in African languages use the word Mulungu to refer to the Father. As another example, Jesus Christ is referred to as mwana wa Mulungu ("child of Mulungu") in modern religious songs in Chichewa language (Malawi). The word was also used in Swahili Islamic literature before the derivative name "Mungu" became more common.

Southern Africa

In Mozambique nowadays Mulungo in CiSena language is seen as the Almighty God directly related to Christianity as Father of Jesus Christ. Mulungu wanga which means My God.

== See also ==
- Bantu mythology
- Syncretism
