= Babbar Patera =

Patera on Io

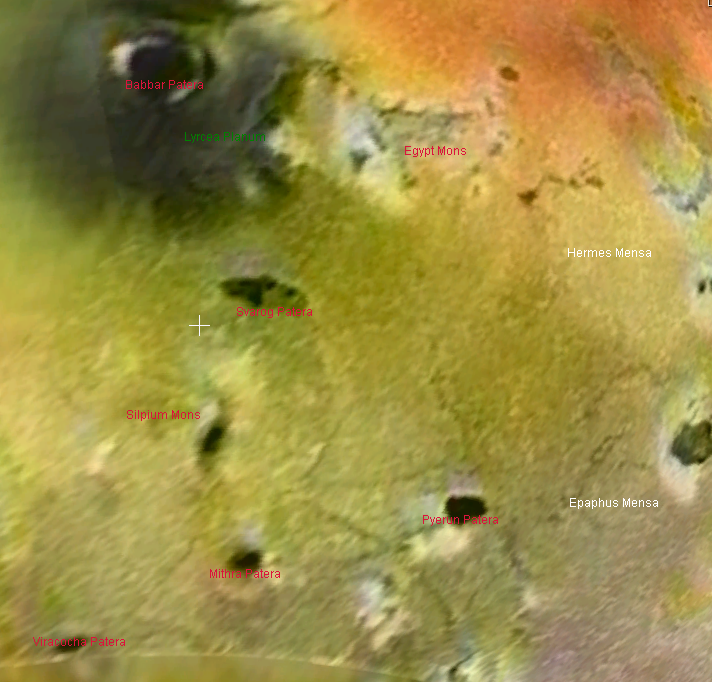
Babbar Patera, located in the top-left corner of a screenshot from NASA World Wind.

Babbar Patera is a patera, or a complex crater with scalloped edges, on Jupiter's moon Io. It is about 86 kilometers in diameter and is located at 39.8°S 272°W. It is named after a Sumerian sun god, and its name was approved by the International Astronomical Union in 1979. Some scarps near Babbar Patera may represent faults. Immediately south of Babbar Patera is the plateau Lyrcea Planum, and further south is Svarog Patera. To the east is the mountain Egypt Mons. An eruption was recorded on the 31st of May, 2005
