= Silpium Mons =

Mountain on Jupiter's moon Io

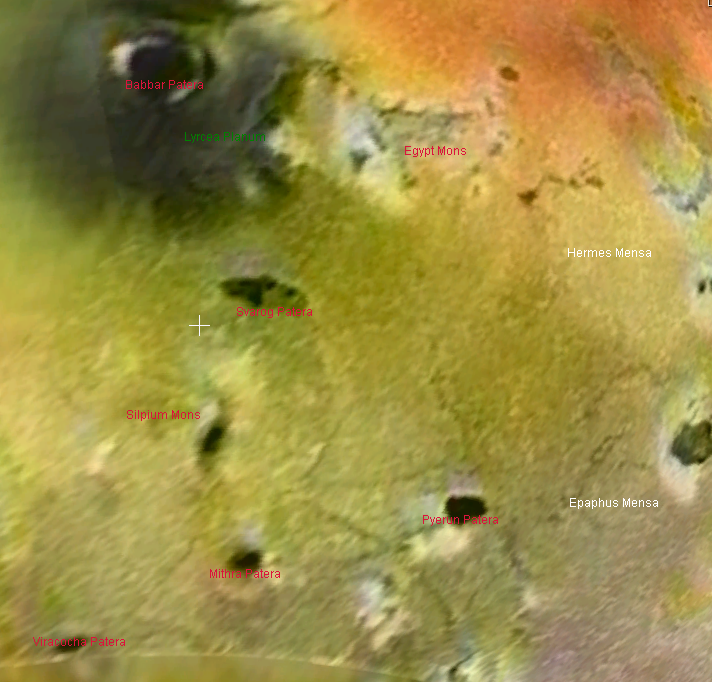
A screenshot of an area including Silpium Mons, from NASA World Wind.

Silpium Mons is a mountain on Jupiter's moon Io. It is 5.6 kilometers in height, 113 kilometers in length, and 79.7 kilometers in width. It covers an area of 7073 km^{2}. It is a striated ridge, meaning it is an elevated structure dominated by one or more prominent linear or arcuate rises. It is named after a location in Greece where the mythological Io died of grief. Its name was adopted by the International Astronomical Union in 1979. It is located at 52.71°S 272.34°W, south of Svarog Patera, north of Mithra Patera, and northeast of Viracocha Patera. Its proximity to Svarog and Viracocha Paterae has been suggested to be evidence for a structural relationship between mountains and calderas on Io.
