= Maxwell Montes =

Montes on Venus

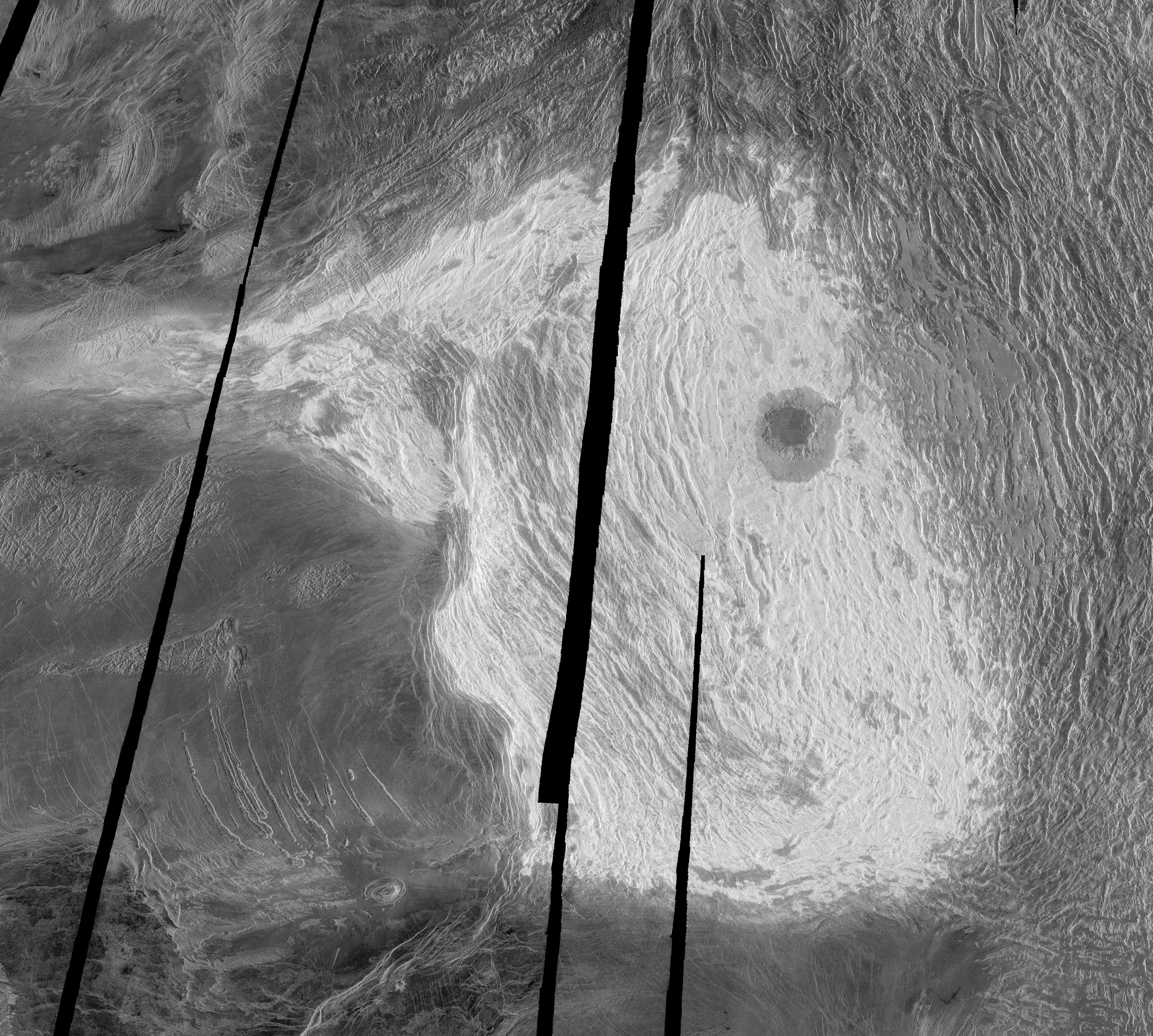
- Radar image of Maxwell Montes (bright area; darker circle is Cleopatra crater; grey patch to the left is Lakshmi Planum, both embedded in Ishtar Terra)
- Feature type: Mountain range
- Location: Central Ishtar Terra, Venus
- Coordinates: 65.2°N 3.3°E
- Diameter: 797 kilometres (495 mi)
- Eponym: James Clerk Maxwell (only Venusian feature named after a man)

Maxwell Montes /ˈmækswɛl ˈmɒntiːz/ is a mountain range on the planet Venus.

== General description ==
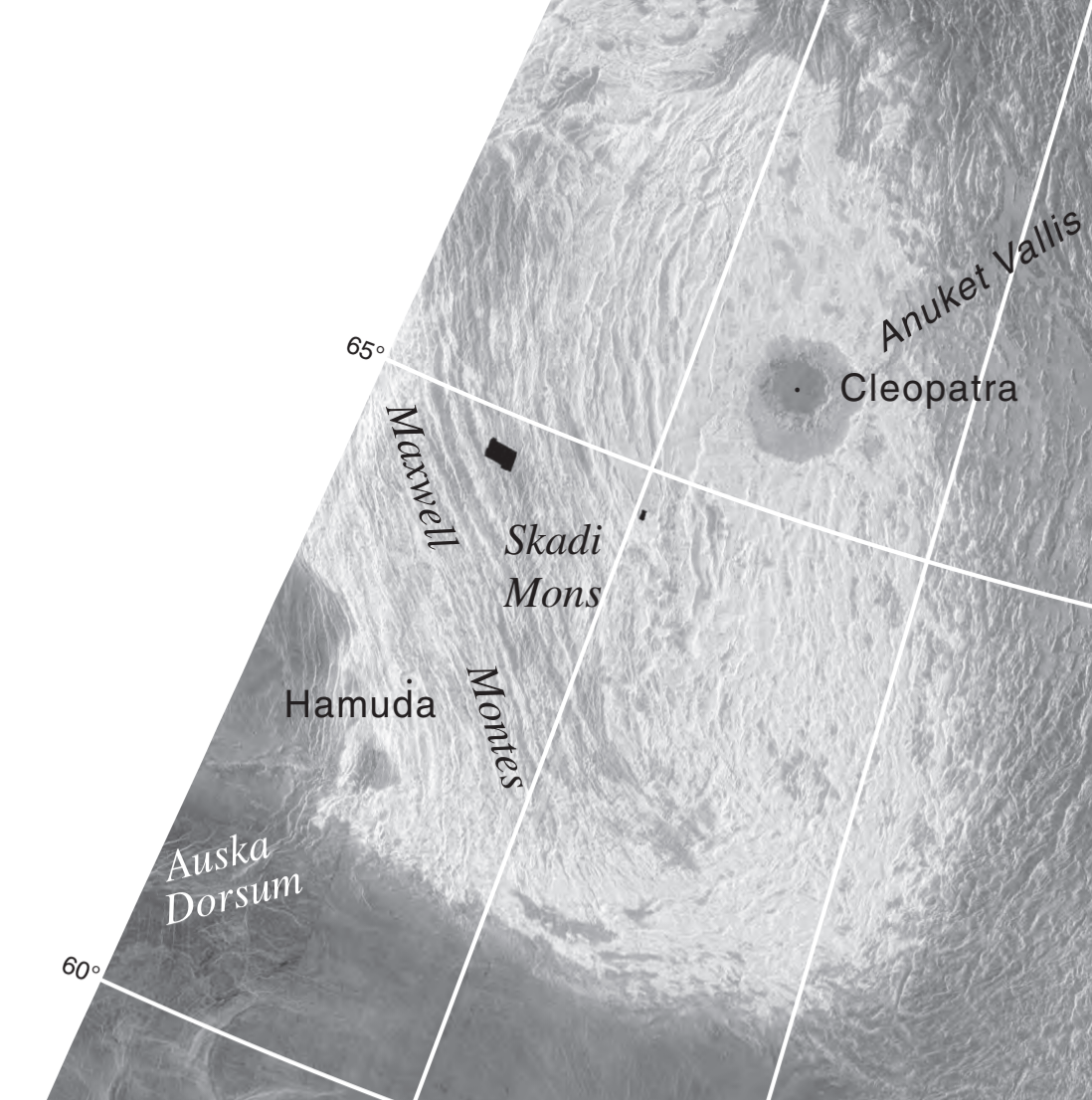
Maxwell Montes with named features (black squares are missing map data)

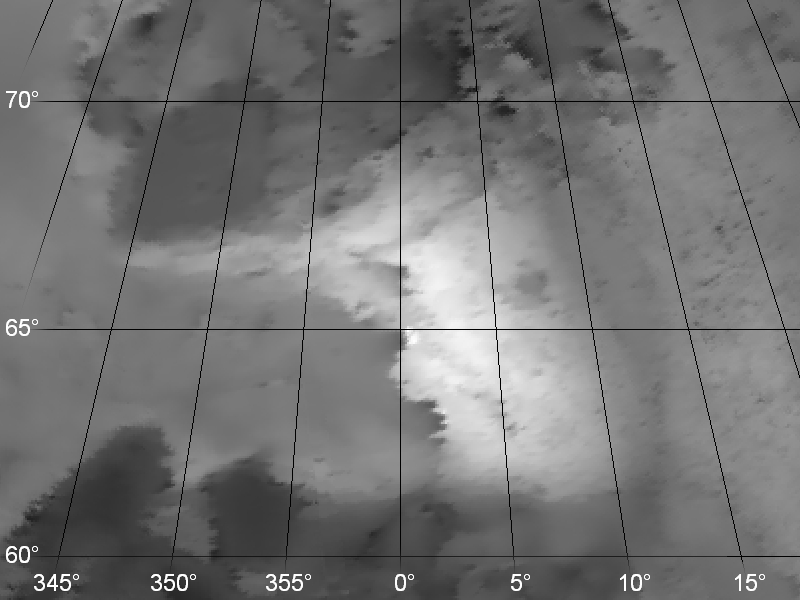
Maxwell Montes on Venus: hypsometric map based on Magellan altimeter data

Located on Ishtar Terra, the more northern of the planet's two major highlands, Maxwell Montes is 11 kilometres (36,000 ft) high. It rises about 6.4 kilometers above and to the east (21,000 ft above, and 4 miles (6.44 km) to the east) of Lakshmi Planum, and is about 853 kilometres (530 mi) long by 700 kilometres (435 mi) wide. The western slopes are very steep, whereas the eastern slopes descend gradually into Fortuna Tessera. Due to its elevation, it is at its top the coolest (about 380 °C or 716 °F) and least pressurised (about 45 bar or 44 atm) location on the surface of Venus.

== Origins and geology ==
The origin of the Lakshmi Planum and the mountain belts such as Maxwell Montes is controversial. One theory suggests they formed over a hot plume of material rising from Venus's interior, while another says the region is being compressed (pushed together) from all sides, resulting in material descending into the planet's interior. Broad ridges and valleys making up Maxwell Montes and Fortuna Tessera suggest that the topography resulted from compression. The parallel ridges and valleys were cut by later extensional faults. The extreme height of Maxwell Montes with other compressional mountain ranges around Lakshmi Planum suggests that its origin is more complex.

Most of Maxwell Montes has a bright radar return which is common on Venus at high altitudes. This phenomenon is thought to result from the presence of a mineral, possibly a metallic snow. Early suggestions included pyrite and tellurium; more recently, lead sulfide and bismuth sulfide.

== Radar mapping and naming ==
By using radar to probe through the permanent and thick clouds in the Venusian atmosphere and make observations of the surface, scientists at the American Arecibo Radio Telescope in Puerto Rico discovered the extensive highland on Venus that came to be called Maxwell Montes in 1967. In 1978, the space probe Pioneer Venus 1 went into orbit around Venus for the purpose of making radar observations of the Venusian surface. These observations made possible the creation of the first topographic map of the surface of Venus, and confirmed that a point within Maxwell Montes is the highest point above the average level of the planet's surface.

Maxwell Montes is named for James Clerk Maxwell whose work in mathematical physics predicted the existence of radio waves, which made radar, and thus the surface observations of Venus, possible. Maxwell Montes, Alpha Regio, and Beta Regio are the three exceptions to the rule that the surface features of Venus are to be named for females. The name, originally given by Ray Jurgens in 1970 on the urging of Tommy Gold, was approved by the International Astronomical Union's Working Group for Planetary System Nomenclature (IAU/WGPSN) between 1976 and 1979.

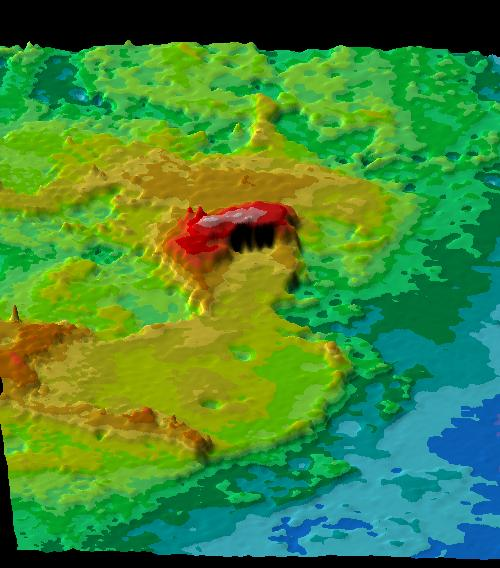
Perspective rendering of Ishtar Terra, at the center of the image is Maxwell Montes, according to its elevation in red and its peaks in white.

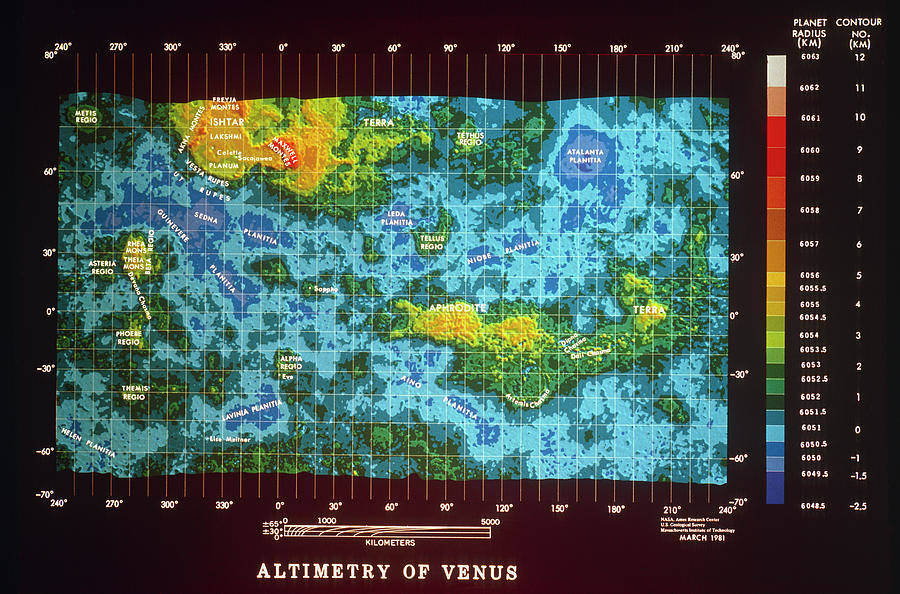
Color-coded elevation map, showing the elevated terrae "continents" in yellow: Ishtar Terra with Maxwell Montes at the top.

== See also ==
- List of montes on Venus
- List of tallest mountains in the Solar System
