= Mithra Patera =

Complex crater with scalloped edges on Jupiter's moon Io

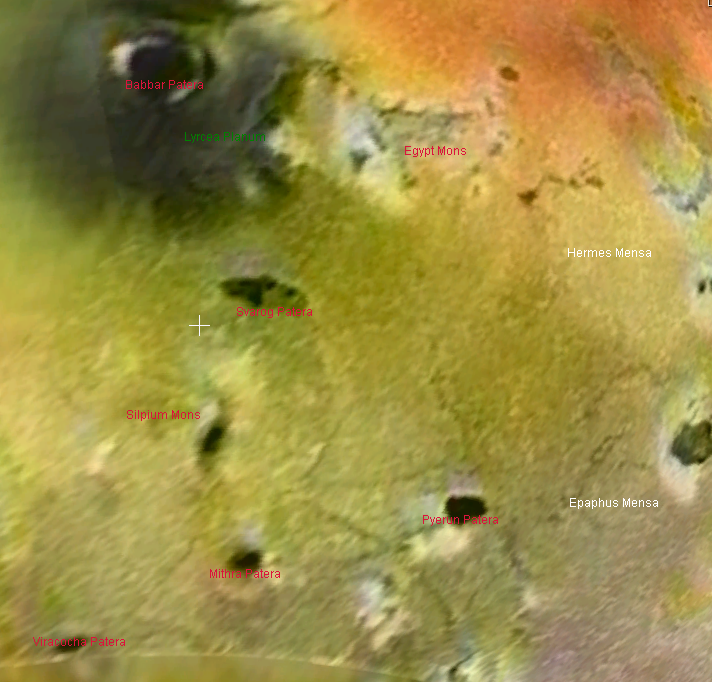
A screenshot of an area including Mithra Patera, from NASA World Wind.

Mithra Patera is a patera, or a complex crater with scalloped edges, on Jupiter's moon Io. It is about 34 kilometers in diameter and is located at 59.04°S 266.48°W. It is named after the Persian god of light, Mithra. Its name was adopted by the International Astronomical Union in 1985. To the north is Silpian Mons, and to the east is Pyerun Patera. Located southwest is Viracocha Patera.
