= Isum =

Isum is a surname. Notable people with the surname include:

- John Isum (1680?–1726), English composer and organist
- Rachel Robinson (née Isum, born 1922), professor, nurse, and widow of Jackie Robinson

== See also ==
- Åsum (disambiguation)
