= Kaskazi =

Ancient African ethno-linguistic group

Kaskazi is a name used to refer to an ancient ethno-linguistic group of Bantu peoples which took shape in the Western Rift area in the early centuries of the last millennium BC within the Mashariki group.

== Origin of name ==
The name comes from the Swahili word for "northern wind", in opposition to the Kusi subgroup ("southern wind"). The Kaskazi subgroup settled north of Mozambique and Malawi, while the Kusi settled in the south. Both the Kaskazi and Kusi did not form as single communities with a single language, but as clusters of communities speaking a variety of slightly different languages.
