= Acala Fluctus =

Volcano on Io

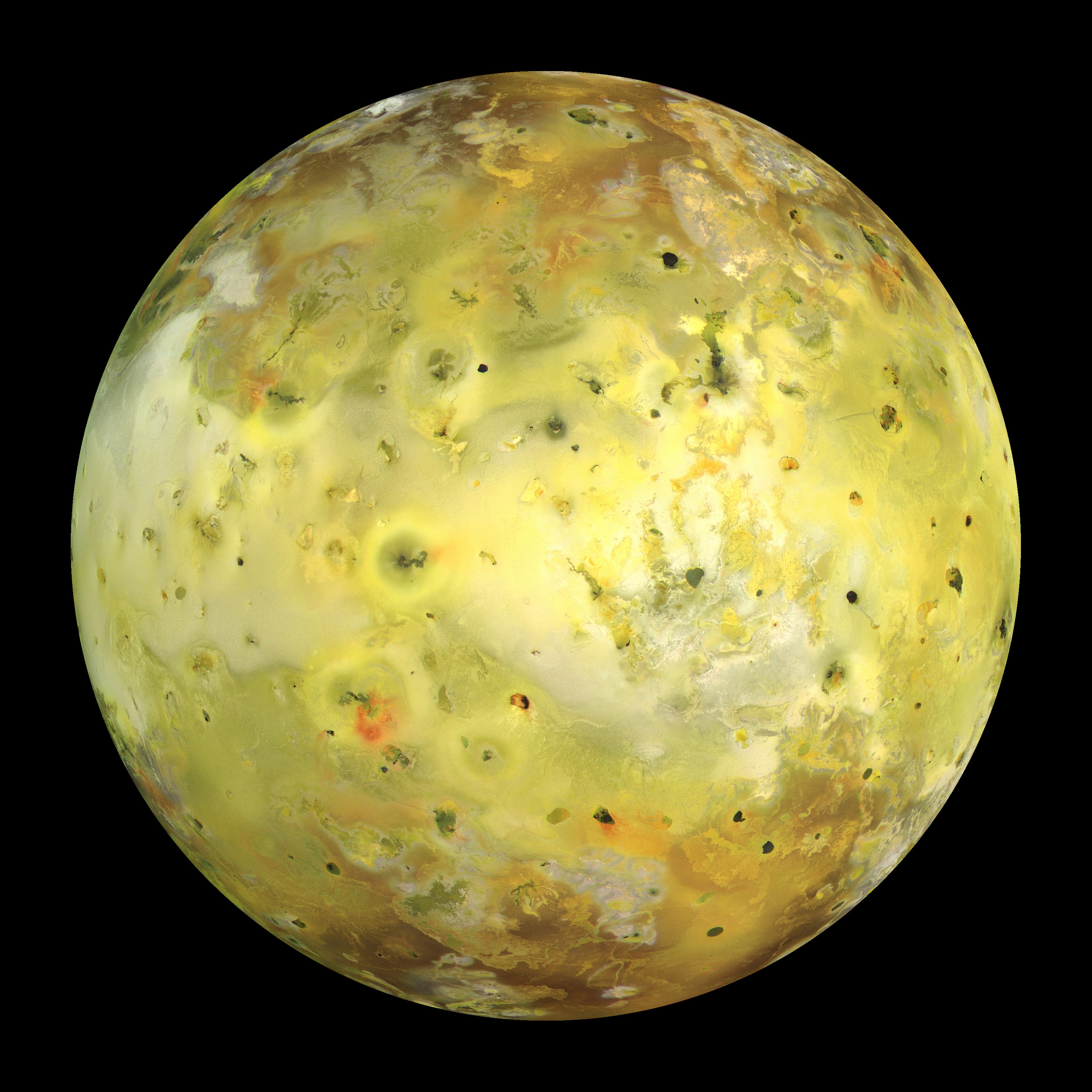
Image of Io from the Galileo spacecraft

Acala Fluctus is a volcano with a diameter of 415.36 kilometers located on the moon Io, the most volcanic moon in the solar system orbiting Jupiter. It is the site of sporadic fire fountaining activity with variable high temperatures.

== History ==
Low-temperature spots were detected in 1979 by Voyager IRIS. In the late 1990s, the Galileo spacecraft detected a high-temperature hot spot over Acala Fluctus. Then Galileo also detected low-temperature hot spots on Acala Fluctus in the year 2000. Observations from Ground-based Infrared Telescopes showed that Acala Fluctus was active for ~18 months in the years 2019 and 2020. During that time it experienced two outburst with temperatures of ~1200 Kelvin.
