= Kami-Nari Patera =

Complex crater with scalloped edges on Jupiter's moon Io

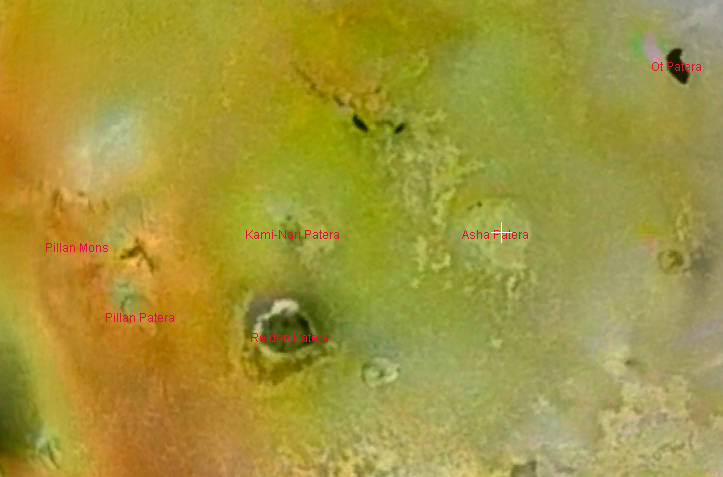
Kami-Nari Patera, in a screenshot taken in NASA World Wind. Click to enlarge.

Kami-Nari Patera is a patera, or a complex crater with scalloped edges, on Jupiter's moon Io. It is approximately 53 kilometers in diameter and is located at 8.7°S 235.08°W. It is named after the Japanese god of rolling thunder, Kami-Nari. Its name was adopted by the International Astronomical Union in 2000. Reiden Patera can be found to the south, and Asha Patera can be found to the east.
