= Cleopatra (crater) =

Crater on Venus

Cleopatra crater
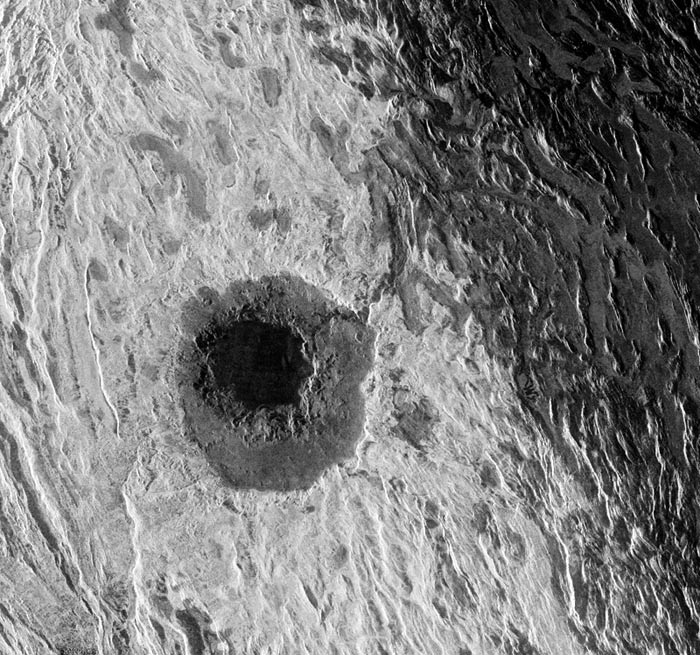
- Radar image of Cleopatra by Magellan
- Feature type: double ring impact crater
- Coordinates: 65.8°N 7.1°E
- Diameter: 105 km
- Eponym: Cleopatra VII

Cleopatra (initially called Cleopatra Patera) is an impact crater on Venus, in Maxwell Montes. Cleopatra is a double-ring impact basin about 100 kilometers (62 mi) in diameter and 2.5 kilometers (1.6 mi) deep. A steep-walled, winding channel a few kilometers wide (Anuket Vallis) breaks through the rough terrain surrounding the crater rim. A large amount of lava originating in Cleopatra flowed through this channel and filled valleys in Fortuna Tessera. Cleopatra is superimposed on the structures of Maxwell Montes and appears to be undeformed, indicating that Cleopatra is relatively young. The crater is named after Egyptian queen Cleopatra VII.

== Patera geologic description ==
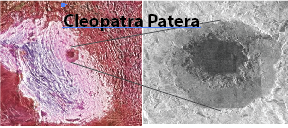
Zoomed in view extrapolated from Magellan spacecraft imagery of Cleopatra patera, eastern flank of Maxwell Montes on Ishtar Terra, Venus, Feb 5, 1994.

Cleopatra is a nearly circular double ring crater on Venus, 2–3 km deep and 105 km in diameter. A patera is geologic feature defined as a crater formed by impact or volcanic origin. Cleopatra patera is unusual in that its origin was debated for twelve years. A volcanic origin initially was supported due to non-impact geologic aspects, such as having a low rim, a surrounding plains-forming unit, and a non-concentric nature of its inner basin, as well as its proximity to Maxwell Montes. However, as more recent missions to Venus improved in the clarity of topographic imagery from Arecibo radio telescope and Venera 15/16 spacecraft, the structures seen in the crater has cleared the scientific controversy and has been since identified as an impact crater.

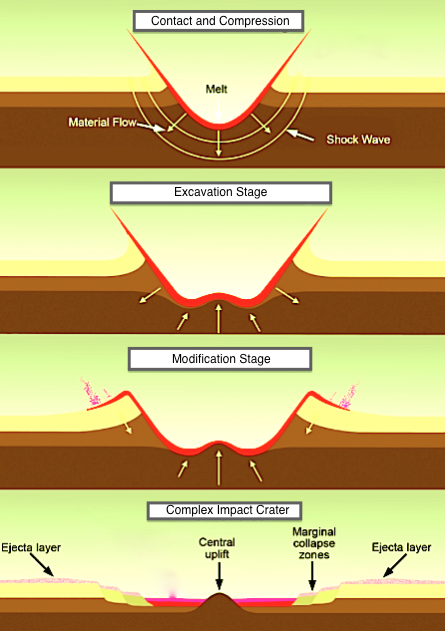
patera is a complex impact crater with a central peak. Cleopatra patera has an asymmetrical central peak, as opposed to the image. Complex craters have terraces, multiple rings, and a central peak. Cleopatra patera is a double ring impact crater. This image is modified from David Kring, NASA University of Arizona Space Imagery Center, 2006.

Cleopatra patera has features in that of a double ring impact crater. The crater rim is scalloped and the center of the crater is steeply slanted down to a smooth dark crater floor. A central peak is found in the center of the crater floor and outside the inner crater is masses of "coarse hummocky terrain." The plains surrounding the crater is smooth and bright, but there are some dark deposits around the topographic depressions just north of the crater. These dark deposits are interpreted to be "shock-melt material" equivalent to ejecta blanket material; however, the dark deposits to the south are "ridge slopes." The outflow of material to the right of the crater is lava flows which have spilled from the bowl shape of the crater due to the impact hitting the steep side of Maxwell Montes, occurring at impact. When the magma chamber at the floor of Cleopatra erupted, subsidence occurred explaining the large depth of the crater.

=== Crater impact model ===
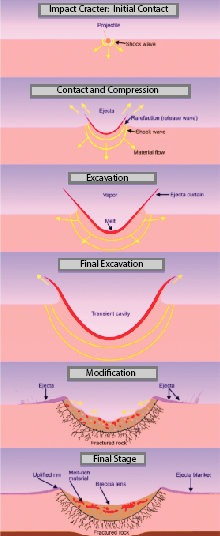
Impact craters differ from a complex impact crater because they lack a central peak, have a small-bowl shape and smooth walled. Before the Magellan mission to Venus in 1994, controversies about the origin of Cleopatra patera existed due to the asymmetric shape of the floor of the crater, which appeared smooth. This image is modified from David Kring, NASA University of Arizona Space Imagery Center, 2006.

Most large impact craters do not have a central peak, yet have sharp rims bordered by asymmetrical radar bright ejecta blankets, have multiple rims, are surrounded and partially filled by subsequent lava which creates a reduced apparent depth, have dark crater floors, and buries some ejecta. By analyzing Magellan images, Cleopatra patera's was found to be distorted in shape in that its noncircular inner ring is off center, but also that the outflow channel of lava moves from within the crater and reaches the top of the crater rim. The interiors are radar dark and smooth in comparison to the surrounding plains. From the image of Plate P-11 from Venera 15 and 16 shows that Cleopatra patera that was originally interpreted as a large caldera but has now been interpreted as a multi-ringed impact crater with a central peak. Using photogeologic analysis, the floor of the crater has a shallow central depression resulting from subsidence of uplifted mantle material from below due to "viscous relaxation". This was found in Venusian craters larger than 70 km in diameter by using altimetry data which shows surfaces with different elevations from the Magellan mission.

== Original volcanic model ==
Prior to improved satellite imagery from the Magellan spacecraft mapping mission to Venus in 1994, the topography of Venus was interpreted from lower quality images received from radio telescopes and altimetric data. This data allowed for a misinterpretation of the crater; however, it is important to understand what was seen geometrically to explain why certain hypotheses withstood many years. It was found that the topographic elevation on Maxwell Montes resulted from a combination of horizontal compression and vertical crustal thickening, which in combination allowed for the lower crust to be partially melted, so long as the crustal thickness exceeds 40 km. Significant crustal thickening occurs in terrestrial orogenic belts either through obduction or isostatic subsidence as the mountain grows in height. Based on the model and the information pertinent to understanding the tectonic environment surrounding the patera, crustal anatexis is a viable model for the origin of magmatism at Cleopatra Patera. This process could be associated with other high mountain belts on Venus and with melting of pre-existing rock in the Himalayan granites. This results in the melting of the lower levels of the thickened crust and potential magmatic activity, volcanism, and caldera formation at the surface.

=== Volcanic evidence ===
The following evidence from Schaber et al. was the leading explanation for a volcanic origin for twelve years until Magellan imagery was returned in the early 1990s.

1. a volcanic origin of Cleopatra patera included its association with plains forming deposit sloping away from the crater in a lava flow
2. the depth and steepness of the walls of the crater interpreted as multiple calderas
3. the elongation of the outer rim deposits following along the same path as the tectonic features of the area
4. the absence of a raised highly backscattered rim deposit seen in impact craters
5. the large depth to diameter ratio
6. and its situation in a regional tectonic environment

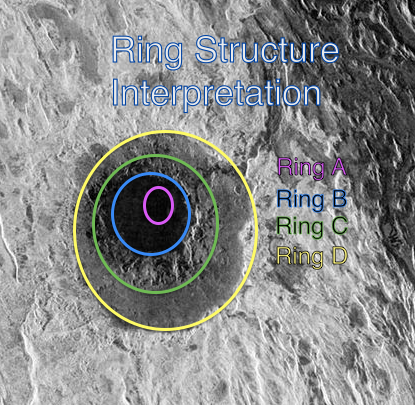
Volcanotectonic interpretation of ring structures of Cleopatra Patera as interpreted from Peterfreund et al.

The best comparison to Cleopatra is the Alba Patera on Mars and Cleopatra's ring structure was intensely interpreted to link it to a volcanic origin. Peterfreund et al. and Scraber et al. described their interpretation of the rings as follows:

1. Alba patera has a caldera of similar size to Ring B, interpreted image of rings to the right, and is surrounded by structural patterns produced by tectonic deformation (refer to previous image).
2. Cleopatra shares commonalities with impact craters on Venus because of it radially smooth interior and rough exterior. However, the asymmetry of ring A challenges an impact hypothesis.
3. Ring C and D represents structural areas associated with the initial crater
4. The area within C is related to material ejected from a volcano or has been heavily fractured and deformed very differently from the surrounding terrain.
5. Ring D has a tectonic fracture that was involved in deformation.

== See also ==
- Geology of Venus
- List of geological features on Venus
- Maxwell Montes
- Tessera (Venus)
- Volcanism on Venus
