= Manua Patera =

Patera on Jupiter's moon Io

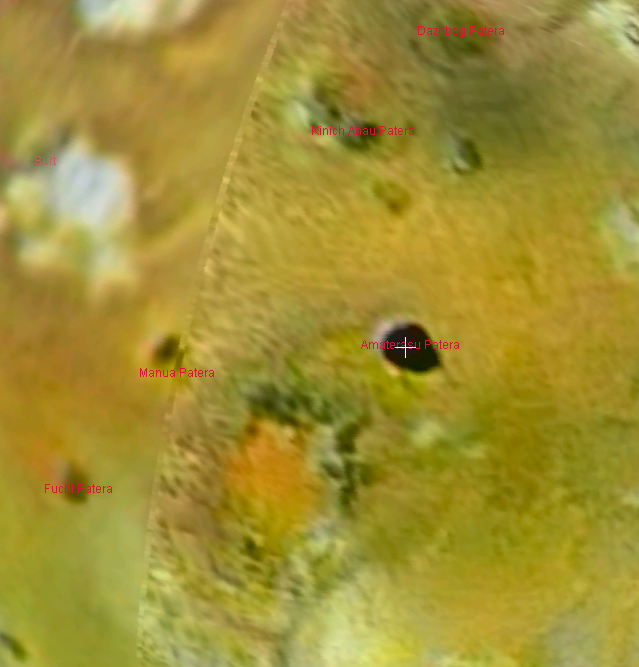
Manua Patera, in a screenshot taken in NASA World Wind. Click to enlarge.

Manua Patera is a patera, or a complex crater with scalloped edges, on Jupiter's moon Io. It is about 110 kilometers in diameter and is located at 35.78°N 321.73°W. It is named after the Hawaiian sun god Manua. Its name was adopted by the International Astronomical Union in 1979. To the southwest is Fuchi Patera, and to the east is Amaterasu Patera.
