= Tawhaki Patera =

Patera on Io

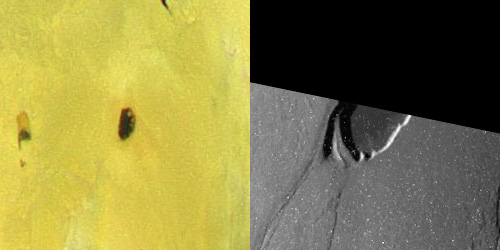
Highest resolution images of Tawhaki Patera, taken by the Galileo spacecraft. Color image on the left acquired in July 1999. The gray scale image on the right taken in November 1999.

Tawhaki Patera is an active volcano on Jupiter's moon Io. It is located on Io's leading hemisphere at 3.32°N 76.18°W within the equatorial plains of western Media Regio. Tawhaki is an Ionian patera, a type of volcanic crater similar to a caldera, 49.8 kilometers (30.9 mi) wide and 550 meters (1,800 ft) deep.

Tawhaki Patera was first seen as a dark spot in low-resolution Voyager 1 in March 1979. However, volcanic activity was not observed at Tawhaki until September 1997 when a bright thermal hotspot was observed at near-infrared wavelengths while Io was in the shadow of Jupiter by the camera on the Galileo spacecraft. Tawhaki would also be observed as a hotspot while Io was in eclipse in November 1997 during Galileo's eleventh orbit. The high temperature period of the eruption at Tawhaki ceased by May 1998. It is uncertain whether this delay is due to real changes in activity at Tawhaki or the poor resolution of the Voyager data and Galileo data from the Near-Infrared Mapping Spectrometer (NIMS).

Tawhaki Patera is one of several volcanoes suspected of being responsible for the August 2, 1999 9908A outburst eruption, one of the most energetic observed on Io. However, the low-resolution of the ground-based observation precludes a definitive identification of the source volcano of the eruption beyond that it was located in northwestern Media Regio on Io's leading hemisphere. The NIMS instrument did detect a thermal hotspot between one and five micrometres at Tawhaki during Galileo's 21st orbit in July 1999, a month prior to the eruption. The southern half of Tawhaki Patera was observed by Galileo at 260 meters per pixel during an encounter with Io on November 26, 1999, providing the highest resolution image of this volcano. This along with a color observation taken in July 1999, showed that the floor of Tawhaki contained some of the darkest material in the area, suggesting the cooled lava at Tawhaki is very young, consistent with the activity seen during the Galileo mission. A lava channel, later named Tawhaki Vallis was also found to the southeast. The channel maybe related to earlier activity at Tawhaki Patera, but the images of the region cut off the northern half of the volcano and channel, preventing a relationship between the two volcanic features to be established. In August 2001, NIMS once again observed a low level of activity at Tawhaki Patera.

The volcano was formally named Tawhaki Patera by the International Astronomical Union in 2000 after the Māori lightning god, Tāwhaki. The Galileo imaging team suggested the name Hine-i-tapeka Patera, but Tawhaki Patera was chosen instead.
