= Dazhbog Patera =

Patera (volcanic caldera) on Jupiter's moon Io

The north polar region of Io, as imaged by the Juno spacecraft. The dark-floored caldera in the center of the image is Dazhbog Patera

Dazhbog Patera is a patera (volcanic caldera) on Jupiter's moon Io. Named after Dažbog in 1979, it has a largest size of approximately 120 km and is located 55.13°N 301.52°W. This volcano is difficult to differentiate from the other volcanoes and geological features in some images of Io. In images from the Voyager spacecraft, this caldera is quite prominent with its dark reddish floor with a darkish halo around the caldera. However, in Galileo images it is hard to tell where the volcano is. One would suspect that this would mean that it was inactive. But in July 1998, the Hubble Space Telescope using its NICMOS instrument detected a hotspot at Dazhbog.

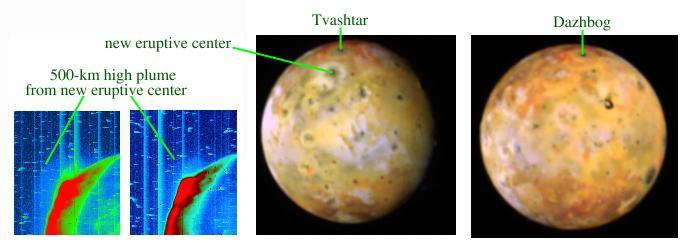
Dazhbog Patera (right picture)
