= Svarog Patera =

Complex crater with scalloped edges on Jupiter's moon Io

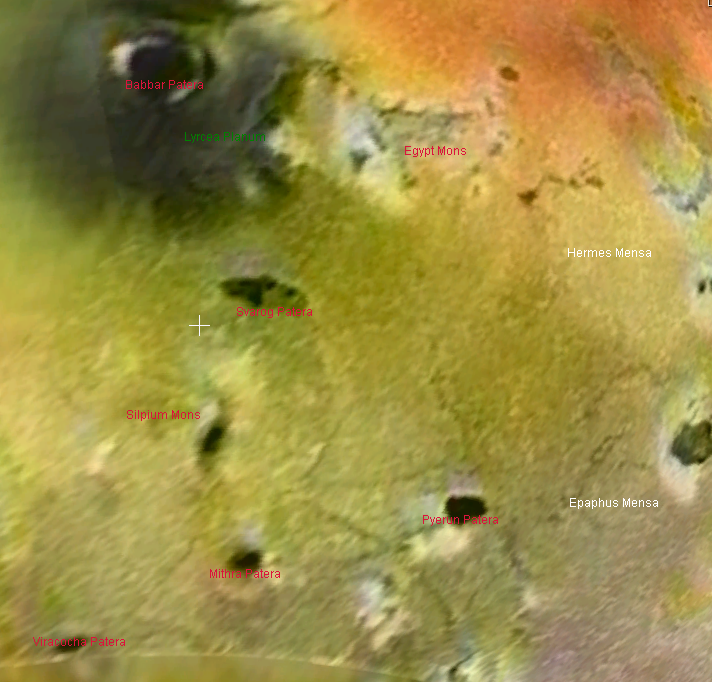
A screenshot of an area including Svarog Patera, from NASA World Wind.

Svarog Patera is a patera, or a complex crater with scalloped edges, on Jupiter's moon Io. It is 124 kilometers in diameter and is located at 48.66°S 265.74°W. It is named after the Russian smith god Svarog. Its name was approved by the International Astronomical Union in 1979. Svarog Patera is a Voyager spacecraft-detected hot spot. North of Svarog Patera is Lyrcea Planum, north of which is Babbar Patera. To the south is Silpium Mons, and to the east is Hermes Mensa. To the southeast are Pyerun Patera and Epaphus Mensa.
