= Ah Peku =

God of thunder in Maya mythology

In Maya mythology, Ah Peku (pek-ku) was a god of thunder.

Ah Peku resided on mountaintops, and climbed up into clouds during storms to create thunder.
