= Tawhaki Vallis =

Vallis on Io

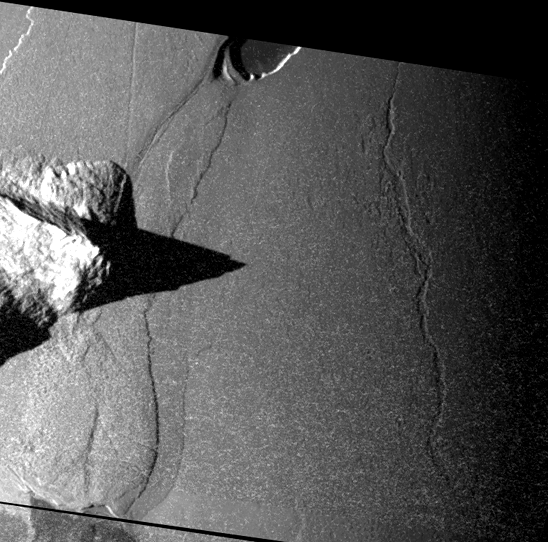
Galileo image of Tawhaki Vallis taken in November 1999. The valley runs roughly north-south on the right side of the image. North is up. Sunlight illuminates this terrain from the left.

Tawhaki Vallis is a shallow valley on Jupiter's moon Io. It is located on Io's leading hemisphere in the equatorial plains of western Media Regio at 0.5°N 72.8°W. The valley is 190 kilometers long, 0.5 to 6 km wide, and 40 to 65 meters deep. Due to the shallow depth and lack of brightness or color variations associated with it, Tawhaki Vallis was seen in only a single, high-spatial-resolution observation taken by Galileo during an Io encounter on November 26, 1999. The northern and southern ends of the valley are cut off by the northern margin of the observation and the dusk terminator, so Tawhaki could be longer than the measured length. The valley was formally named Tawhaki Vallis by the International Astronomical Union in 2006 after a nearby volcano, Tawhaki Patera, and the Māori lightning god, Tāwhaki.

Analysis of the topography of Tawhaki Vallis shows that it is likely a lava channel, eroded into the Media Regio plain by thermal erosion. The channel is braided, with high-standing islands in the middle of the channel. Changes in channel width are likely due to differences in the topography or substrate properties of the plains. Because the floor of the channel is lower than the surrounding plains, lava that once flowed through the channel carved it through thermal erosion, rather than constructed from cooled lava. The theory that Tawhaki Vallis is a lava channel rather than a flow is also supported by the lack of levees on either side of the channel. This would require the lava that flowed through to be insulated from radiative and conductive cooling along the 200-km long channel. However, the flat floor of the channel and the lack of pit crater chains nearby would also preclude the possibility that Tawhaki Vallis is a collapsed lava tube, like Hadley Rille on the Moon. Depending on the composition of the lava and the substrate, Tawhaki Vallis may have formed over a period of 400–600 days (for ultramafic lava flowing over ultramafic plains), 10–60 days (for sulfur lava flow over sulfur plains), or hours to a few days when a high-temperature lava flows over a substrate with a much cooler melting point, such as ultramafic lava over plains composed primarily of sulfur. Considering the need to keep the lava liquid enough to flow over these long distances and typical duration of eruptions that could carve a channel like this, the latter possibility (high-temperature lava over a surface with a cooler melting temperature) is considered the most likely.

Similar channels to Tawhaki Vallis have also been observed near Zamama and Emakong Patera. Those channels are clearly associated with their respective volcano, but based on the images available, it is not known if an eruption at Tawhaki Patera was responsible for the formation of Tawhaki Vallis.
