= Gish Bar Patera =

Complex crater with scalloped edges, on Jupiter's moon Io

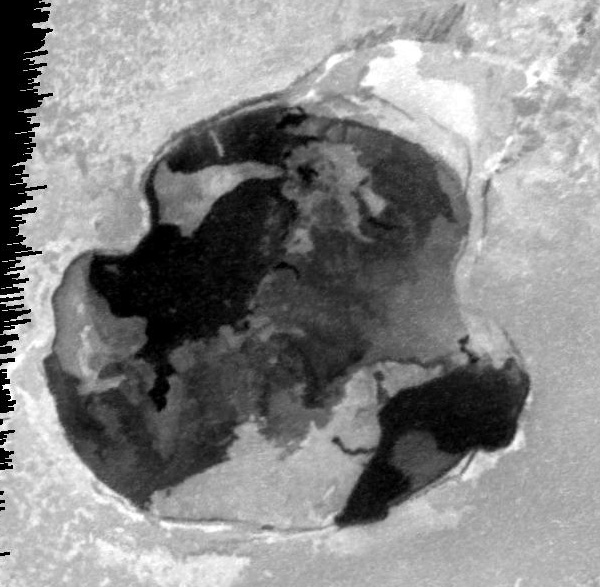
Highest-resolution image of Gish Bar Patera, acquired by Galileo during an encounter with Io in October 2001

Gish Bar Patera is a patera, or a complex crater with scalloped edges, on Jupiter's moon Io. It is 106.3 by 115.0 kilometers and 9,600 km^{2} in area. It is located at 16.18°N 90.26°W. It is named after the Babylonian sun god Gish Bar. Its name was approved by the International Astronomical Union in 1997. It is located at the southern base of Gish Bar Mons, an 11-kilometer-high mountain. To the northeast is Skythia Mons, and to the east is Monan Mons, at the north and south ends of which are Monan Patera and Ah Peku Patera.

The NASA spacecraft Galileo has detected volcanic activity in Gish Bar Patera's past, particularly in 1996, and a new eruption was detected by Galileo's near-infrared mapping spectrometer in August 2001. The western section of the patera is mostly green, with a few bright spots, whereas the eastern section is mostly orange. The active northwestern region of Gish Bar Patera has a mottled floor from several eruptions. The patera's flows may be composed of silicates.
