= Reiden Patera =

Volcanic feature on Jupiter's moon Io

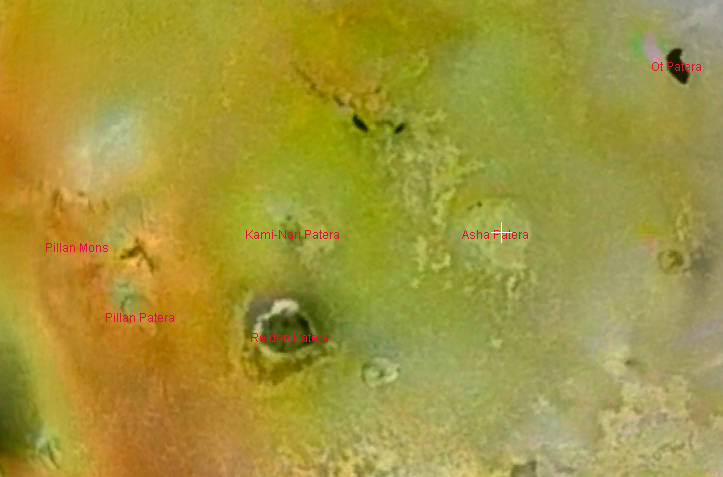
Reiden Patera, in a screenshot taken in NASA World Wind. Click to enlarge.

Reiden Patera is a volcanic feature on Jupiter's moon Io. It was first detected by the Galileo SSI Team during the spacecraft Galileo's first orbit around Jupiter, initially detected as a hotspot. It was once thought that the activity there had stopped or waned below the limits of the spacecraft's Solid State Imager or Near-Infrared Mapping Spectrometer. However, it was noticed in 2002 that Reiden Patera has darkened considerably since the 24th orbit of Galileo. It has been spouting bright red pyroclastic deposits of its own. It is located at 13.4°S 235.45°W and is 70 kilometers in diameter. It is named after a Japanese thunder god ("Raijin" in current English nomenclature). Asha Patera can be found to the east, and Kami-Nari Patera can be found to the north.
