= Amirani (volcano) =

Volcano on Io

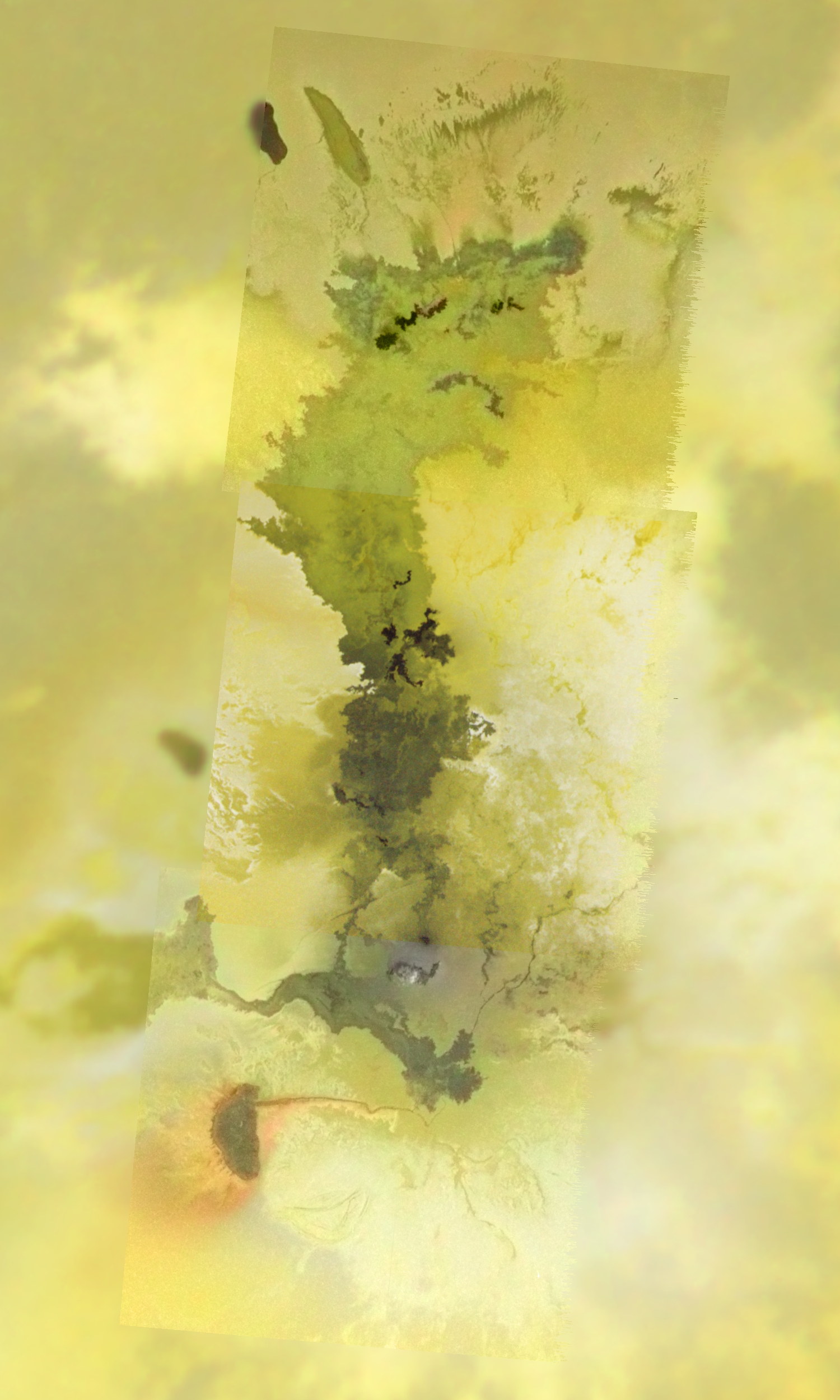
Galileo color mosaic of Amirani and its flow field

Amirani is an active volcano on Jupiter's moon Io, the inner-most of the Galilean Moons. It is located on Io's leading hemisphere at 24.46°N 114.68°W. The volcano is responsible for the largest active lava flow in the entire Solar System, with recent flows dwarfing those of even other volcanos on Io.

The volcano was first observed in images acquired by the Voyager 1 spacecraft in March 1979. Later that year, the International Astronomical Union named this feature after a Georgian fire god, Amirani.

== Composition and physical attributes ==
Amirani is about the same age as Jupiter, which is around 4.5 billion years old. It is surrounded by the Gish Bar Patera. Within the mountains of the crater, Amirani lies at the center of a frozen sulphuric lava field that consists of a half-circle shaped, 37 kilometer wide volcanic pit, which is connected to a 330 kilometer compound lava flow by a narrow channel. The southern half of the Amirani flow field is surrounded by a white plume of bright sulfuric dioxide (SO2) diffuse deposits composed of basalt and silica, that freeze and fall to the ground during eruptions.

== Eruptions ==
The recent lava flows observed by the Galileo appeared to have covered about 620 square kilometers of Io in less than five months, which was almost 6 times greater than Hawaiian volcano Kīlauea covered in the span of 21 years. This volcano takes on characteristics of a shield volcano on Earth, in which its eruptions create pahoehoe-like lava flows and produce massive amounts of lava consisting of mainly basaltic material and sulfur. Its geological activity is created by the tidal forces brought on by Jupiter. Amirani's eruptions are controlled by the orbit which Io takes around Jupiter. The volcano erupts at temperatures of up to 1,650 degrees Celsius on to the surface of Io, which has an average temperature of negative 95 degrees Celsius. Unlike volcanoes on Earth, Amirani can erupt for years at a time with constant lava flows pouring out onto Io's surface.

== Origin of name ==
The volcano was named Amirani after the Georgian mythical hero from 3,000 to 2,000 BC. Amirani was considered the equivalent of Prometheus, the Greek Titan, which is also the name of another volcano on Io. It is said that Amirani, son of Dali, the great Goddess of the hunt, defied God by introducing the use of metal to all whom he came in contact with. Amirani's punishment was that he was to be chained on to the Caucasus cliffs and left for dead. As Amirani struggled to free himself, an eagle attacked his liver every day.
