= Patera (planetary nomenclature) =

Irregular type of crater

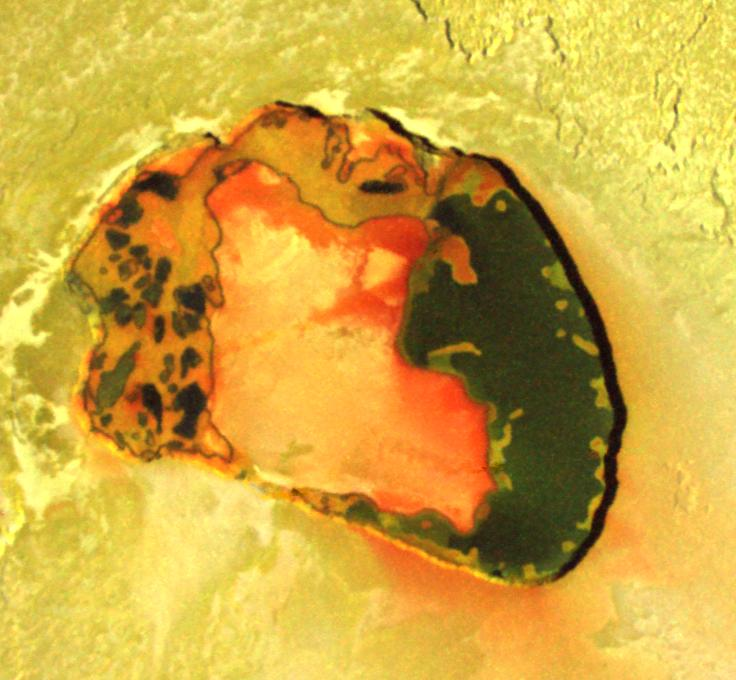
Tupan Patera on Io

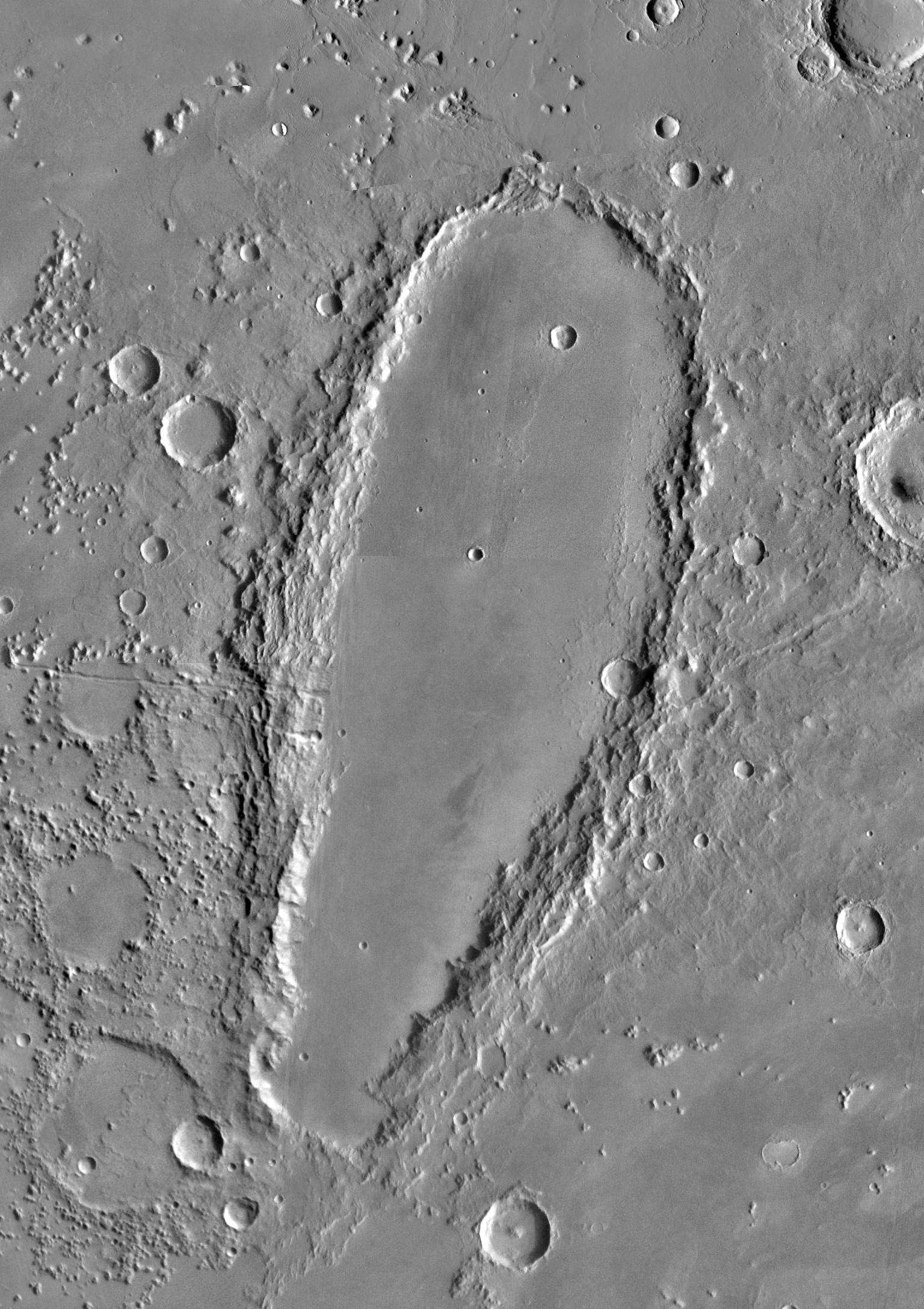
Orcus Patera on Mars

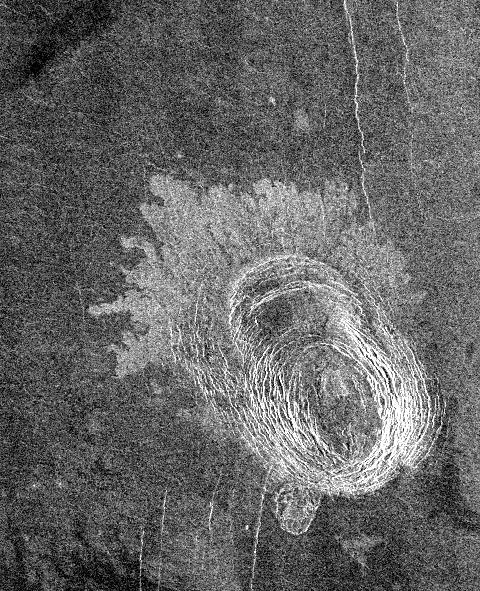
Sachs Patera on Venus

Patera /ˈpætərə/ PAT-ər-ə (plural: paterae /ˈpætəri/ PAT-ə-ree) is an irregular crater, or a complex crater with scalloped edges on a celestial body. Paterae can have any origin (volcanic, impact or other), although the majority of them were created by volcanism. The term comes from Latin, where it refers to a shallow bowl used in antique cultures.

This term is used in planetary nomenclature: it is a part of the international names of such features. In such names, it is capitalized and stands after the proper given name (e.g., Pillan Patera). Besides that, it can be used as a description term and applied even to unnamed features.

== Nature of paterae ==
The term "patera", like other terms of planetary nomenclature, describes only the external view of the feature, but not its origin or geological structure. Majority of paterae of Venus, Mars and Io are volcanic craters or calderas, but some others (like Orcus Patera on Mars), probably, are impact craters. At least some of paterae on Triton, such as Leviathan Patera, and the only (as for 2016) named patera of Titan, Sotra Patera, most probably, have cryovolcanic origin. Some authors include low depth in defining criteria of paterae. There is no clear boundary between paterae and usual craters.

== Peculiarities of usage of the term ==
According to some authors, actual usage of the term "patera" had deviated from its definition, and it became not only nomenclatural, but to some extent geological, being used to indicate volcanic origin of the feature. After Venusian Cleopatra Patera turned out to be an impact crater (instead of a volcanic one, as previously suggested), it was renamed into crater Cleopatra.

Usually volcanic crater gets a proper name if the volcano itself is low and inconspicuous. Otherwise the volcanic mountain is named, and the crater remains unnamed. In some cases, names of Martian volcanic craters with the term "patera" were previously applied to the whole volcano, and it was reflected in values of their sizes given in IAU nomenclatural database. But in 2007, these names were tied to the craters themselves, and the corresponding volcanic mountains obtained names with the terms "Mons" or "Tholus". An example of such mountains is Alba Mons, which obtained its name 34 years after its crater Alba Patera.

The geological term "highland patera" (a kind of low Martian volcanoes with radially channeled flanks), unlike the nomenclatural term "patera", refers to the whole volcano.

== Names of paterae ==
The term "patera" (together with 12 other nomenclatural terms) was introduced into planetary nomenclature in 1973, on XV General Assembly of the International Astronomical Union, when 9 Martian paterae, imaged by Mariner 9 in 1972-1973, were named.

As of August 2016, 249 paterae or their assemblages are named: 144 on Io, 73 on Venus, 20 on Mars, 6 on Ganymede, 5 on Triton and 1 on Titan. They are named differently on different celestial bodies:

- on Venus – after famous women;
- on Mars – after a nearby albedo feature on classical maps by Giovanni Schiaparelli or Eugène Antoniadi;
- on Io – after gods or heroes associated with fire, sun, thunder, volcanoes; after mythical blacksmiths; after associated eruptive centers;
- on Ganymede – after wadis of the Fertile Crescent;
- on Titan – after deities of happiness, peace and harmony of various peoples. But actually the only named patera of Titan is named after Norwegian island Sotra, inherited from cancelled name of associated bright spot Sotra Facula;
- on Triton – with water-associated names, excluding Greek and Roman.
