= Mountains of Io =

Features of the moon of Jupiter

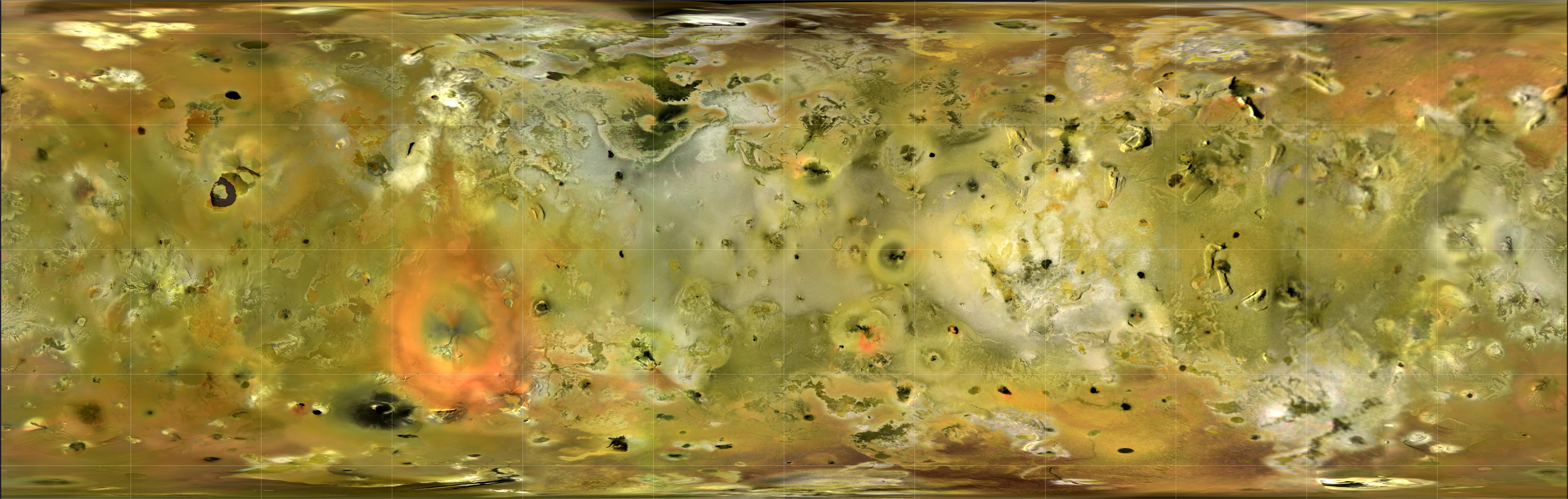
Map of the surface of Io, based on images from the Galileo and Voyager missions.

Mountains are widely distributed across the surface of Io. There are about 115 named mountains; the average length is 157 km (98 mi) and the average height is 6,300 m (20,700 ft). The longest is 570 km (350 mi), and the highest is Boösaule Montes, at 17,500 metres (57,400 ft), taller than any mountain on Earth. Ionian mountains often appear as large, isolated structures; no global tectonic pattern is evident, unlike on Earth, where plate tectonics is dominant.

Io is exceptional for the strong tidal heating it undergoes, caused by the eccentricity of its orbit (which results from its resonance with Europa and Ganymede) in conjunction with the proximity and great mass of Jupiter. This leads to widespread and intensive volcanism. Most volcanoes on Io have little relief; those that can be considered mountains are generally smaller than the mountains formed by tectonic processes, averaging only 1,000 to 2,000 metres (3,300 to 6,600 ft) in height and 40 to 60 kilometres (25 to 37 mi) in width. Several geodynamic models of Io exist but the tectonic mountain-building process is still obscure and debatable. However, it is thought to be related to stresses caused by the rapid volcanic resurfacing of the body.

== Observations ==
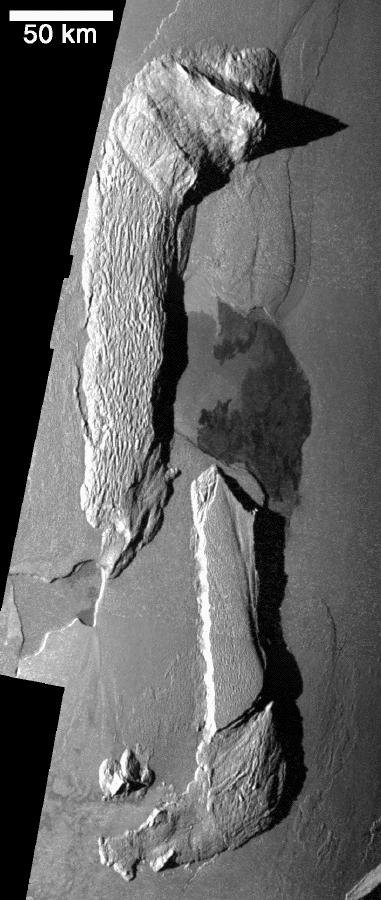
Patera and plateau on Io. NASA's Galileo spacecraft acquired the images in this mosaic of Hi-iaka Patera (the irregularly shaped, dark depression at the center of the image) and two nearby mountains on November 25, 1999, during its 25th orbit. The sharp peak at the top of the image is about 11,000 m (36,000 ft) high, and the two elongated plateaus to the west and south of the caldera are both about 3,500 m (11,500 ft) high. The ridges on the northwestern mountain are often seen on Ionian mountains and are thought to be formed as surface material slides downslope due to gravity.

To explore the origin of Io's mountains, classification of morphological types and description of morphological features are necessary.

Morphological types

Four morphological types of mountains have been identified.

1. Mesa: a mountain with flat top and relatively smooth surface. It may be difficult to distinguish mesas from eroded layered plains. Ethiopia Planum is a good example of this morphological type. Eleven mountains on Io are classified as mesas.
2. Plateau: an elevated plain with a rugged surface. There is no steep or prominent peak on plateau. Iopolis Planum is a good example of this type. About 46% of Ionian mountains belong to this morphological type.
3. Ridge: an elevated structure dominated by one or more linear or arcuate rises. 28 (24%) mountains on Io have been cataloged into this type.
4. Massif: an elevated structure dominated by rugged or complex surface and has one or more peaks. Boösaule Montes and Tohil Mons are good examples.

Common features

Several common features of Ionian mountains have been summarized.

1. Basal scarps: basal scarps always appear as an abrupt boundary of Ionian mountains that separate mountains from volcanic plains. Most Ionian mountains are observed to have this feature. The basal scarps are ten to a few hundred meters high. Sometimes, the scarp is resolved in high-resolution images as the margin of a debris apron. An example is Iopolis Planum.
2. Tilted block: thrust faults have been interpreted to bound tilted blocks on Io. Tilted blocks have a polygonal shape and curved crests. One example is Euboea Montes. A terrestrial analogy is the Black Hills of South Dakota.
3. Mass wasting: several types of mass movement deposits have been observed adjacent to Ionian mountains. Downslope movements of blocks have been noted in at least one place, the Euboea Montes. Fan-shaped deposits resembling debris aprons are found at the base of steep slopes. The ridged or crenulated surfaces of some mountains like northern Hi'iaka Montes may be formed by downslope creep of layered rock.
4. Layered crust: the upper Ionian crust may be layered, as suggested by flowing observations: mountain uplifted 17,000 m (56,000 ft) and exposed crust section at Euboea Montes, different colored units exposed on Haemus Mons, a ridged unit atop northern Hi'iaka Montes, and striations on mountains such as Haemus Mons and Tohil Mons.

== Stresses ==
Stress plays an important role in the origin of Io's mountains. Various kinds of stresses are considered to be responsible for the deformation of the lithosphere. Folding and faulting form all kinds of topographic features on Io.

1. Overburden stress: on Io, the resurfacing process keeps forming new layers at the surface and pushing older layers downwards. Overburden stress is stress imposed on an older layer of rock by the weight of overlying younger layer of rock. The horizontal stress ($\sigma_h$) generated is less than the vertical overburden ($\sigma_v$) by a factor of $\nu$ /(1-$\nu$ ), where $\nu$ is Poisson's ratio (value is 0.25 for rock). The differential stress is ($\sigma_h$)-($\sigma_v$). This tensile stress is insufficient to cause faulting on Io, because the value is less than Byerlee's rule for rock failure in extension. However, the overburden stress may contribute to the faulting when combined with other stresses
2. Subsidence stress: continuous burial of older crust by younger crust causes older rock to be pushed inward to a sphere with a smaller radius. This subsidence of older crust may imply enormous horizontal compressive stress. This stress is related to resurfacing rate (v), Io's radius (R), subsidence distance (ΔR) and Yong's modulus. The subsidence-generated horizontal stress is equal to E/(1-V)× ΔR/R. This stress is more than enough to cause faulting on Io.
3. Thermal stress: thermal stress is another possible stress source on Io, as increasing temperature in Io's crust can cause expansion of the crust. The total tidal heating generated in Io is dissipated to resurfacing processes and conductive heat flow. The more heat used on resurfacing, the less heat can become conductive heat flow and the less thermal stress is caused by heat. The thermal stress is important as it can be generated wherever and whenever volcanic output is less than tidal heating input.

== Geodynamic models ==
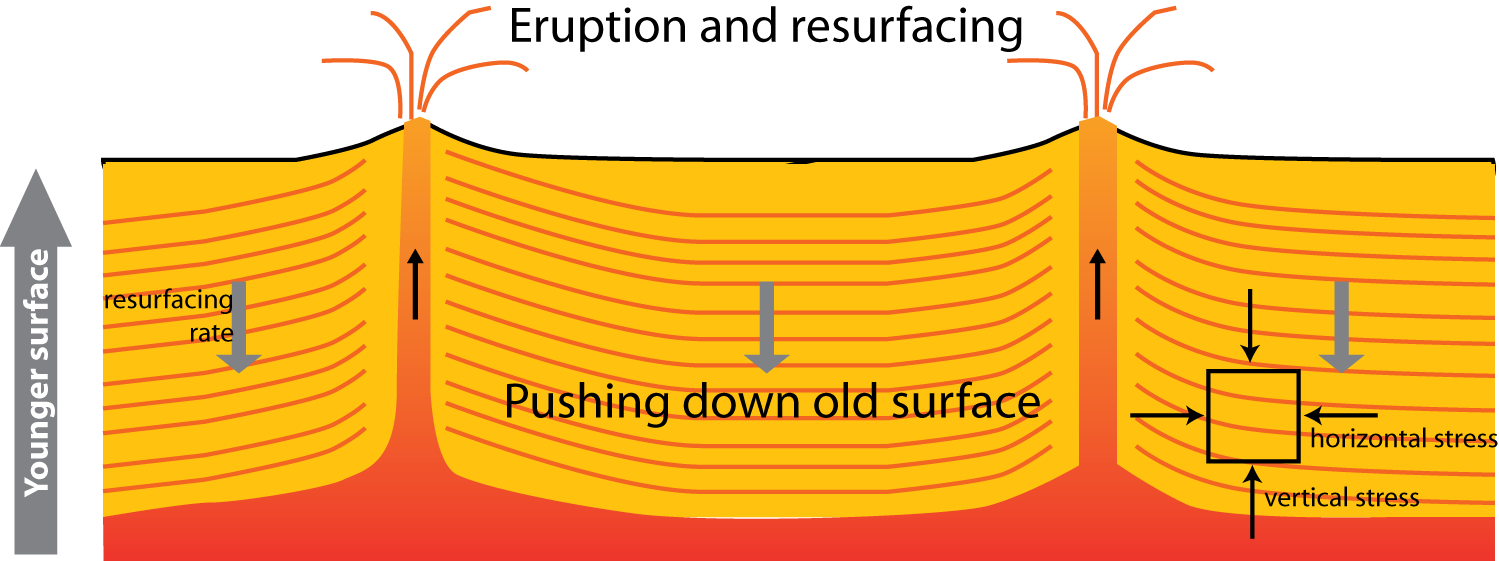
Resurfacing process on Io. Enormous tidal heating causes Io's highly active volcanic activities. Newly generated surfaces push old surfaces inwards. Major stresses related to this process are labeled in this image.

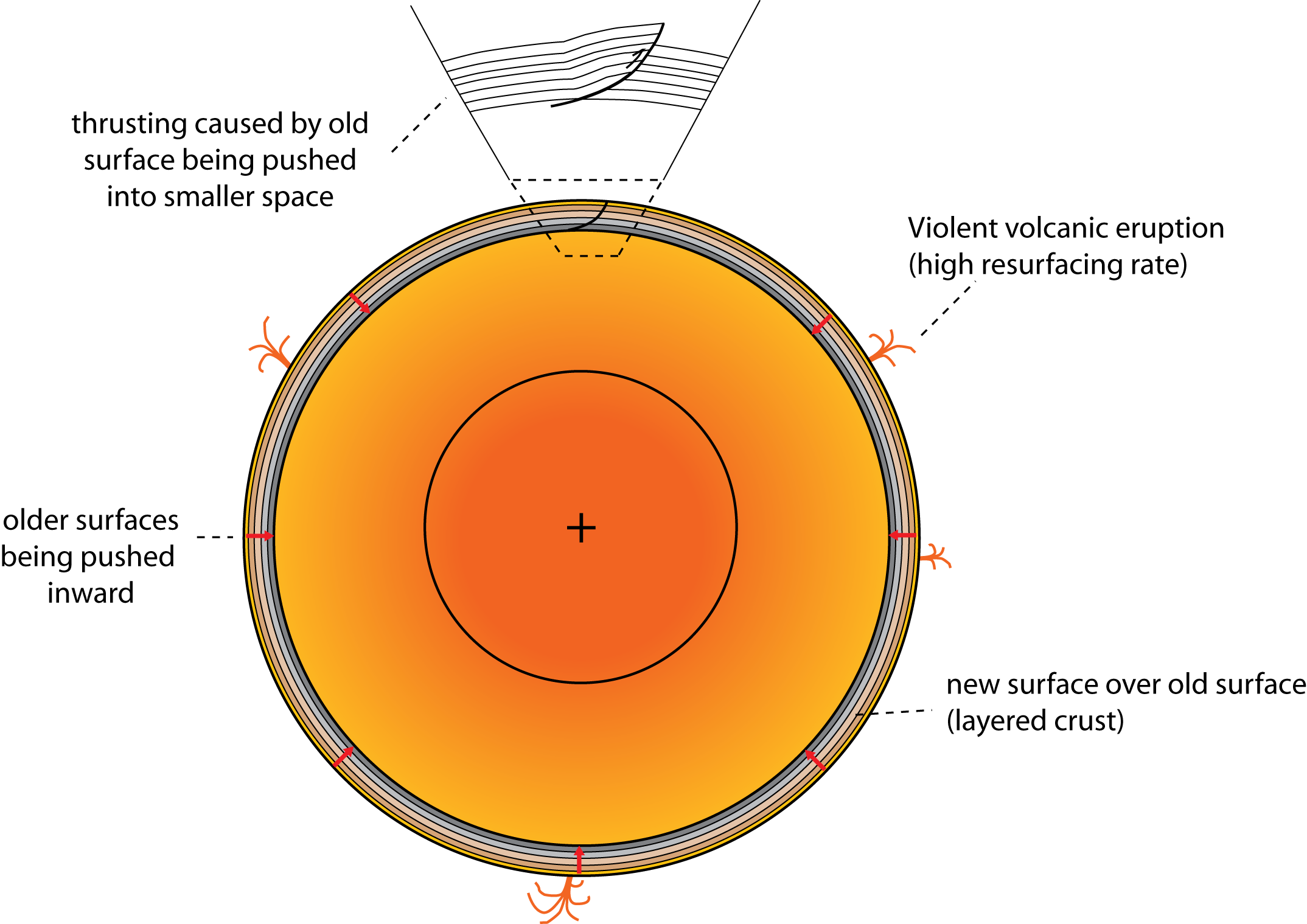
Geodynamic model of Io. Violent volcanic activities cause rapid resurfacing on Io. Newly formed surfaces keep pushing the older layer inwards. As the older layer is squeezed to a smaller sphere, horizontal compressive force cause shortening (horizontal contraction) at the older layer.

Due to a strong tidal heating, Io is very geologically active and is volcanically resurfaced by lavas and plume deposits at a high rate (about 1 centimetre (0.39 in) per year). Several models have been proposed to related this resurfacing process to accumulation of stress in the lithosphere.

Many mountains higher than 10,000 m (33,000 ft) have been observed on Io. This implies that Io has a thick crust. In O'Reilly and Davies' 1981 paper, they proposed that part of the heat in Io is transported by advection. Magma from depths rises to the surface through isolated vents, and spreads out and cools at surface. The solid lithosphere subsides under the continuously generated new lava flow. Solid material is heated by conduction at the base of lithosphere and melts again.

The thrust faulting and uplifting of large crust blocks on Io are interpreted by a model proposed by Schenk and Bulmer's 1998 paper. In the model, Io's crust keeps recycling. Violent volcanic activity brings lava to the surface and older, buried layers are forced to subside. The old volcanic crust materials are compressed laterally as they sink.

A later model presents more details. Io consists of a continuous stack of mafic and ultramafic deposits. After new erupted volcanic materials cool down and are buried, the stack of rocks become indurated and form bedrocks. The bedrocks are fractured due to tidal flexing, compression at depth, volcanic intrusion and other mechanisms, and then are broken into large blocks a hundred kilometers across. Products of magmatism like sills, dikes and batholiths may intrude into layers of stacking volcanics to form a composite crust. Occasionally, the large blocks of crust are rotated and thrusted along deep-rooted thrust faults. This process may expose a cross-section of crust to the surface, as at Euboea Montes. Later, these blocks can also be eroded by mass wasting and reburied by subsequent volcanism. At the base of the crust, materials are met again by heat. Compression at depth due to global burial and subsidence can also form ductile deformation like folding of crust.

== Mountains and paterae ==
"Steeple Mountain" on moon Io (animation; JunoCam; 0:14; 18 April 2024) Note:; The vertical scale is HIGHLY exaggerated (compare: https://www.missionjuno.swri.edu/junocam/processing?id=17654 )

Paterae and mountains are observed to appear near each other on Io. This observation indicates that these two structures are somehow related. As Io has strong tidal heating and very violent volcanic activities, the interior of Io should be vigorously convecting. Localized regions of up-welling and down-welling of mantle material could affect the stress field in Io's lithosphere. Buoyant mantle diapir can locally enhance the compressive stress which may be sufficient for the development of thrust faults. This mechanism would predict curved and circular mountains if it were responsible for the initiating faulting. However, many Ionian mountains are observed to have straight margins. This contradiction indicates that faults exist before the raising of diapirs. Thus, diapirs only provide a mechanism for focusing the stresses in Io's lithosphere. Fractures that are not under compression stress induced by underlying diapiring processes could serve as conduits through which the melt erupts onto the surface. Meanwhile, in a global view, an anti-correlation between the distributions of mountains and volcanic centers is observed on Io. This may reflect a global convective pattern. On the hemisphere which is dominated by up-welling, there are more volcanic centers. On the hemisphere that is dominated by down-welling, there are more mountains.

== Gallery ==
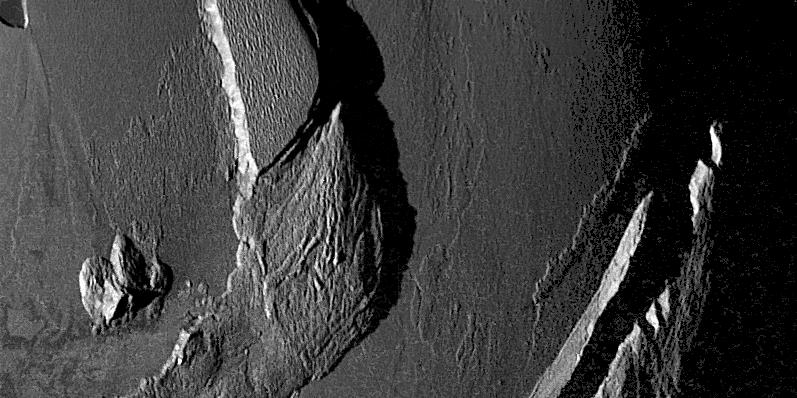
Basal scarps on Io. This image taken by NASA's Galileo spacecraft during its close flyby of Io on November 25, 1999, shows some of the curious mountains found there. The setting sun to the left exaggerates the shadows cast by the mountains. By measuring the lengths of these shadows, Galileo scientists can estimate the height of the mountains. The mountain just left of the middle of the picture is 4,000 m (13,000 ft) high, and the small peak to the lower left is 1,600 m (5,200 ft) high.

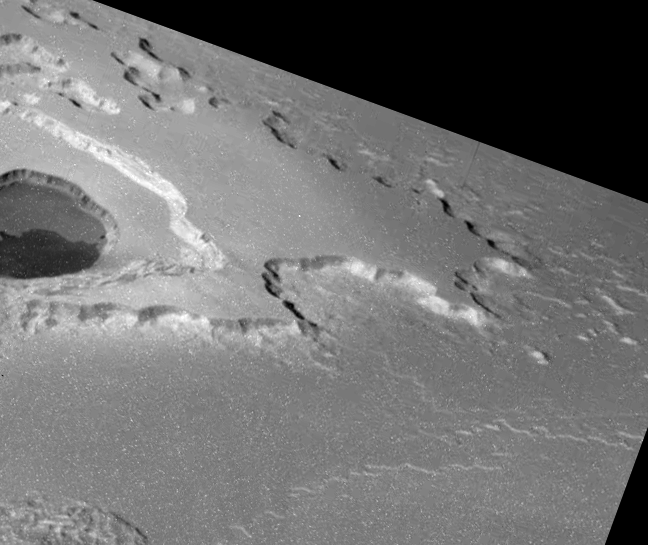
Mesa on Io. This example is Tvashtar Mesa. It has a very flat top and a sharp boundary.

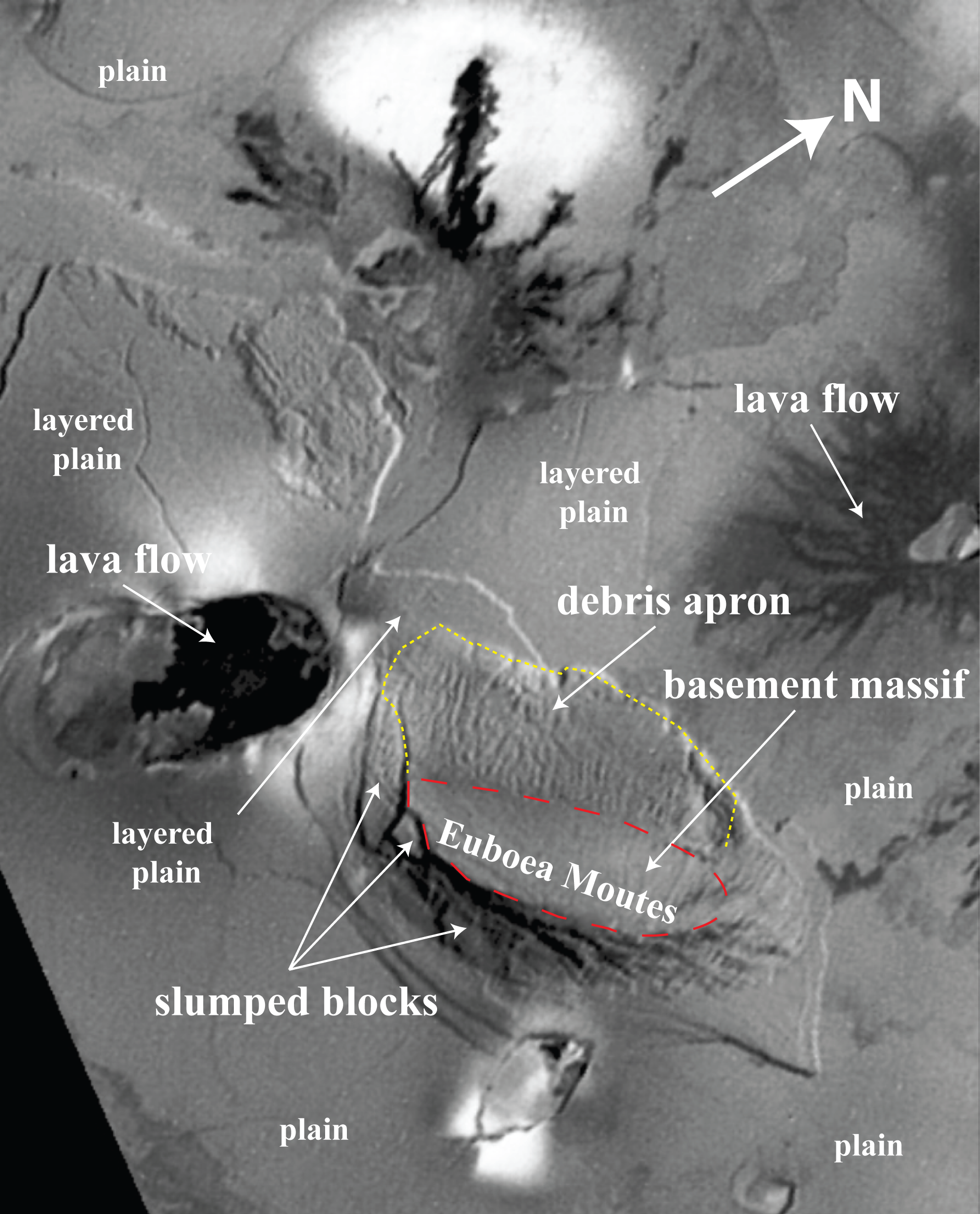
Mass wasting and layered plain on Io. The shape of Euboea Montes, especially the northern flank's thick, ridged deposit, is interpreted by Schenk and Bulmer as evidence of slope failure along the entire face of the northern flank. The northern portion of the image shows layered crust labeled "layered plain".

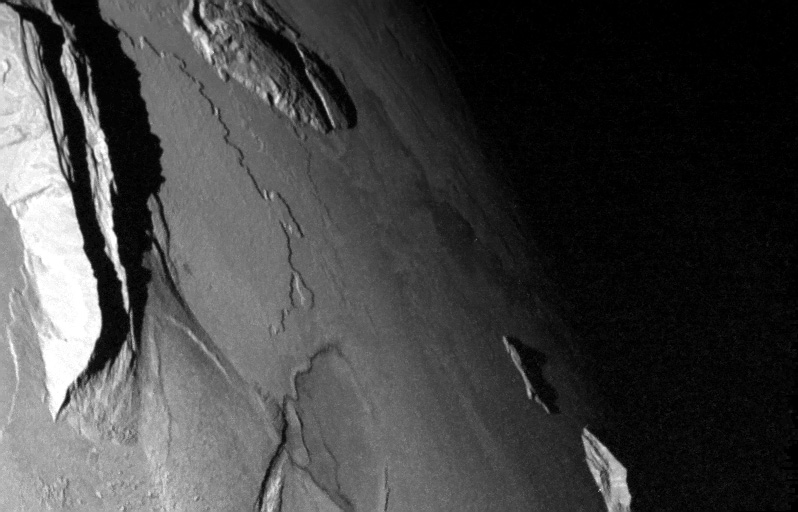
Tilted block on Io

== See also ==
- List of mountains on Io
- Volcanology of Io
