= List of mountains on Io =

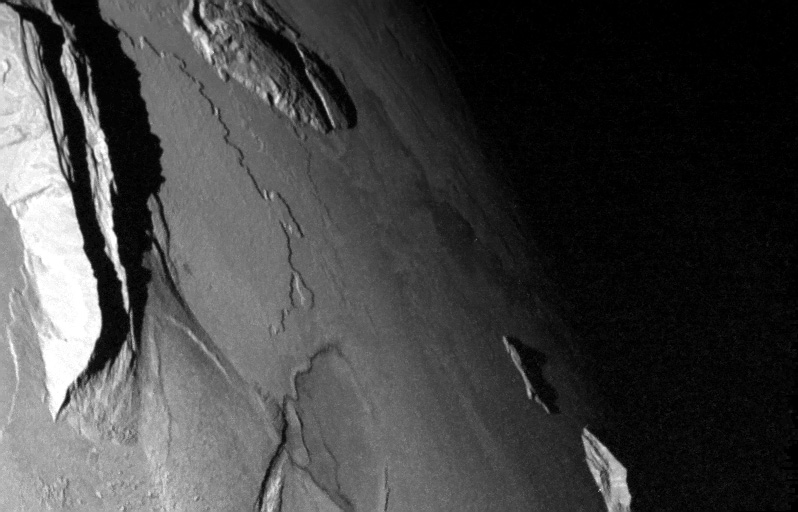
Mongibello Mons and other topographic features on Io's leading hemisphere

More than 135 mountains have been identified on the surface of Jupiter's moon Io. Despite the extensive active volcanism taking place on Io, most mountains on Io are formed through tectonic processes. These structures average 6 km (3.7 mi) in height and reach a maximum of 17.5 ± 1.5 km (10.9 ± 1 mi) at South Boösaule Montes. Mountains often appear as large (the average mountain is 157 km (98 mi) long), isolated structures with no apparent global tectonic patterns outlined, in contrast to the situation on Earth. To support the tremendous topography observed at these mountains requires rock compositions consisting mostly of silicate, as opposed to sulfur.

Mountains on Io (generally, structures rising above the surrounding plains) have a variety of morphologies. Plateaus are most common. These structures resemble large, flat-topped mesas with rugged surfaces. Other mountains appear to be tilted crustal blocks, with a shallow slope from the formerly flat surface and a steep slope consisting of formerly sub-surface materials uplifted by compressive stresses. Both types of mountains often have steep scarps along one or more margins. Only a handful of mountains on Io appear to have a volcanic origin. These mountains resemble small shield volcanoes, with steep slopes (6–7°) near a small, central caldera and shallow slopes along their margins. These volcanic mountains are often smaller than the average mountain on Io, averaging only 1 to 2 km (0.62 to 1.24 mi) in height and 40 to 60 km (25 to 37 mi) wide. Other shield volcanoes with much shallower slopes are inferred from the morphology of several of Io's volcanoes, where thin flows radiate out from a central patera, such as at Ra Patera.

Some of Io's mountains have received official names from the International Astronomical Union. The names are a combination of a name of a person or place derived from the Greek mythological story of Io, Dante's Inferno, or from the name of a nearby feature on Io surface and an approved descriptive term. The descriptive terms, or categories, used for these mountains depends on their morphology, which is a reflection of the mountain's age, geologic origin (volcanic or tectonic), and mass wasting processes. Mountains consisting of massifs, ridges, or isolated peaks use the descriptive term, mons or the plural montes, the Latin term for mountain. These features are named after prominent locations from the Greek mythological travels of Io or places mentioned in Dante's Inferno. Plateaus are normally given the descriptive term mensa (pl. mensae), the Latin term for mesa, though some mountains with plateau morphology use mons. Ionian mensae are named after mythological figures associated with the Io myth, characters from Dante's Inferno. Like mountains, these features can also be named after nearby volcanoes. Some units of layered plains have names using the descriptive term planum (pl. plana). However other more mountainous structures, such as Danube Planum, use the term. Partly as a result of the inconsistent use of this term, planum has not been used since the Voyager era. Ionian plana are named after locations associated with the Io myth. Rare cases of volcanic mountains, such as the shield volcano Tsũi Goab Tholus, use the term tholus (plural: tholi). Ionian tholi are named after people associated with the Io myth or nearby features on Io's surface.

See also the list of volcanic features on Io and the list of regions on Io.

== List of named Ionian mountains ==
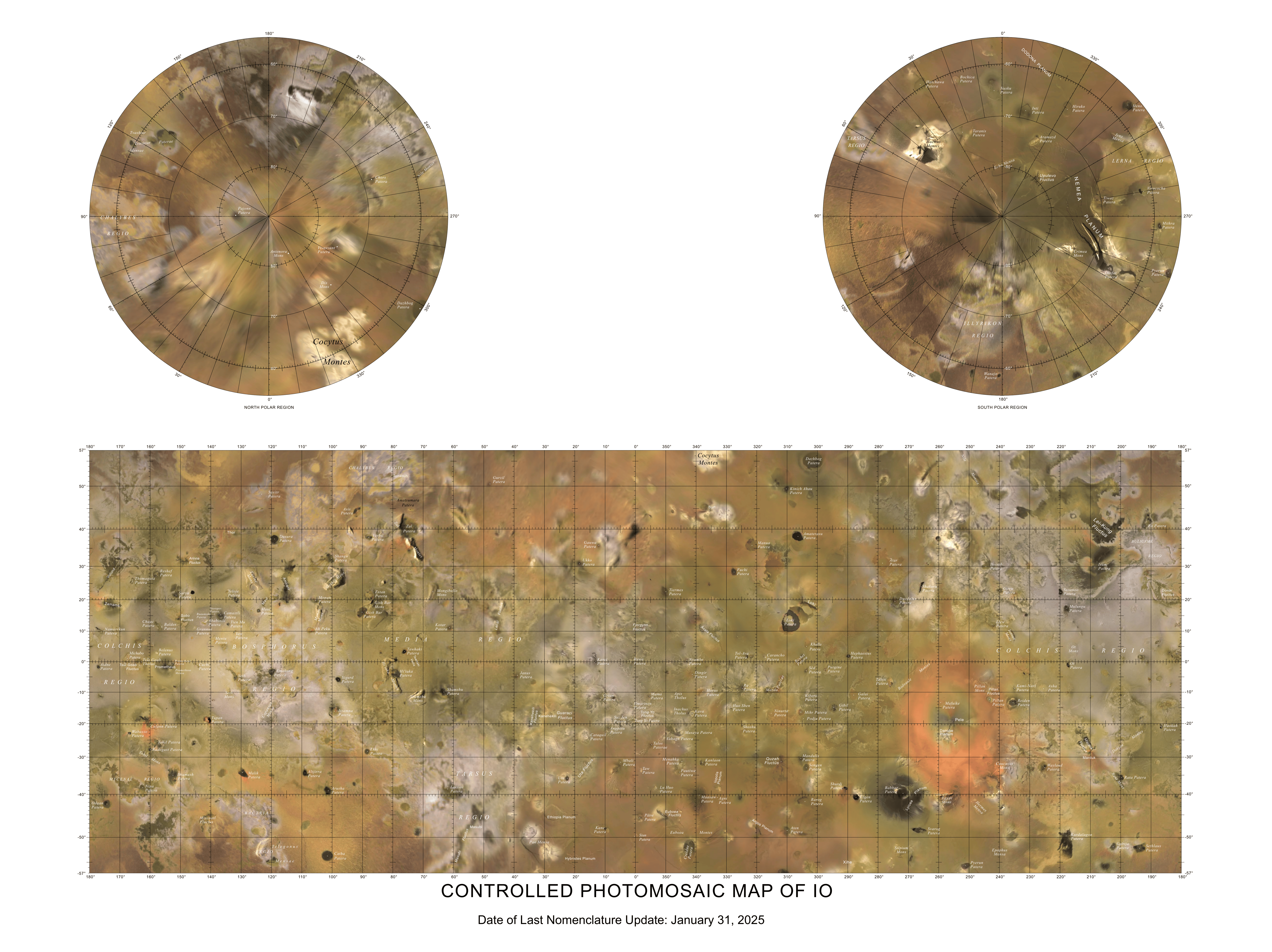
A complete map of Io's surface with labels.

The following table lists those positive topographic structures (mountains, plateaus, shield volcanoes, and layered plains) that have been given names by the International Astronomical Union. Coordinates and Length come from the USGS website that hosts that nomenclature list. Height information from Paul Schenk's 2001 paper, "The mountains of Io: Global and geological perspectives from Voyager and Galileo". When the name refers to multiple mountains, the tallest peak from Schenk et al. 2001 is listed. Those whose heights come from another sources are noted and sourced in the table. Height ranges result from uncertainties due to different methods used to determine the height of the mountain.

Mountain	Named after	Coordinates	Length	Height
Antenora Mons	Antenora	84.90°N 333.65°W	122.00 km	
Apis Tholus	Apis (Greek)	10.9°S 347.88°W	145.71 km	N/A
Argos Planum	Argos	47.98°S 317.81°W	195.45 km	3.2 km
Boösaule Montes	Boösaule (Greek)	3.68°S 269.09°W	546.98 km	17.5–18.2 km
Capaneus Mensa	Capaneus (The Divine Comedy)	16.4°S 121.59°W	291.49 km	9.2–9.5 km
Caucasus Mons	Caucasus	32.38°S 238.57°W	152.44 km	10.6 km
Cocytus Montes	Cocytus	60.989°N 331.67°W	542.0 km	
Crimea Mons	Crimea	76.16°S 241.18°W	143.31 km	3.7 km
Danube Planum	Danube River	22.73°S 257.44°W	244.22 km	5.5 km
Dis Mons	Dis	70.89°N 318.02°W	150.0 km	5–7 km
Dodona Planum	Dodona	58.8°S 347.51°W	522.83 km	N/A
Dorian Montes	Dorian	25.89°S 198.13°W	495.25 km	8.5–9.2 km
Echo Mensa	Echo (Greek)	80.0°S 355.63°W	203.41 km	1.5 km
Egypt Mons	Egypt	41.49°S 257.6°W	193.66 km	10.0 km
Epaphus Mensa	Epaphus (Greek)	52.97°S 239.99°W	203.41 km	N/A
Ethiopia Planum	Ethiopia	45.3°S 24.59°W	331.32 km	4.5 km
Euboea Montes	Euboea	48.89°S 338.77°W	439.94 km	10.3–13.4 km
Euxine Mons	Euxine	26.27°N 126.49°W	286.17 km	7.7 km
Gish Bar Mons	Gish Bar (Babylonian)	18.6°N 87.7°W	110.0 km	9.7–11.0 km
Haemus Montes	Haemus (Greek)	69.71°S 46.23°W	333.56 km	10.8 km
Hermes Mensa	Hermes (Greek)	43.48°S 246.3°W	134.8 km	N/A
Hiʻiaka Montes	Hiʻiaka (Hawaiian)	5.13°S 81.8°W	406.34 km	11.1 km
Hybristes Planum	Hybristes	54.41°S 18.45°W	195.1 km	N/A
Inachus Tholus	Inachus (Greek)	16.18°S 347.76°W	176.96 km	1.8 km
Ionian Mons	Ionian Sea	8.61°N 236.56°W	159.08 km	12.7 km
Iopolis Planum	Iopolis	35.31°S 332.72°W	240.16 km	4.5 km
Iynx Mensa	Iynx (Greek)	62.25°S 303.98°W	121.64 km	4.5 km
Lyrcea Planum	Lyrcea	41.92°S 268.83°W	423.71 km	N/A
Monan Mons	Monan (Brazilian)	15.2°N 104.5°W	297.0 km	6.5 km
Mongibello Mons	Mount Etna	22.75°N 66.95°W	183.37 km	8.6 km
Nemea Planum	Nemea	72.82°S 267.72°W	835.05 km	2.8–6.0 km
Nile Montes	Nile	52.07°N 250.02°W	449.99 km	5.5–6.5 km
Ot Mons	Ot Ene (Mongolian)	4.21°N 215.64°W	154.71 km	3.6 km
Pan Mensa	Pan (Greek)	50.88°S 31.77°W	218.09 km	5.0 km
Pillan Mons	Pillan (Araucanian)	8.81°S 246.72°W	163.0 km	5.0–5.3 km
Prometheus Mensa	Prometheus (Greek)	1.9°S 151.9°W	184.0 km	N/A
Rata Mons	Rātā (Maori)	36.3°S 201.16°W	169.93 km	7.0–8.1 km
Seth Mons	Seth (Egyptian)	10.72°S 134.19°W	135.96 km	7.0–7.5 km
Shamshu Mons	Shamsu (Arabian)	12.0°S 71.51°W	215.12 km	2.9 km
Silpium Mons	Silpium (Greek)	52.71°S 272.34°W	114.54 km	5.5 km
Skythia Mons	Scythia (Greek)	26.21°N 99.01°W	253.35 km	5.5–6.0 km
Telegonus Mensae	Telegonus (Greek)	53.31°S 115.89°W	336.99 km	2.7–4.0 km
Tohil Mons	Tohil (Mayan)	29.5°S 160.49°W	371.47 km	9.0–9.4 km
Tsũi Goab Tholus	Tsui (Khoikhoi)	0.1°S 163.0°W	53.0 km	0.8 km
Tvashtar Mensae	Tvashtar (Hindu)	61.6°N 119.94°W	326.4 km	6.0–6.6 km
Zal Montes	Zal (Iranian)	38.08°N 77.0°W	428.17 km	7.4 km

== See also ==
- List of mountains
- List of mountain types
- Category:Lists of mountains
- List of mountain ranges
- List of highest mountains
- List of peaks by prominence
- List of tallest mountains in the Solar System
- Mountaineering
