= List of regions on Io =

This is a list of named regions on Jupiter's moon Io. These names have been approved for use by the International Astronomical Union. The features listed below represent a subset of the total known bright regions on Io's surface with many currently not having an officially approved name. These areas are large-scale regions on Io's surface that are notable for their difference in brightness or color from their surroundings. In most cases, these areas are bright terrains, consisting of sulfur dioxide frost/ice fields, suggesting that they are colder than their surroundings.

The names of regions on Io use a combination of a name derived from locations in Greek mythology associated with the nymph Io or Dante's Inferno, or from the name of a nearby feature on Io's surface and the descriptor term, regio, Latin for region. Coordinate, diameter, and name source below come from the IAU's Solar System Nomenclature Website.

See also the list of mountains on Io and the list of volcanic features on Io.

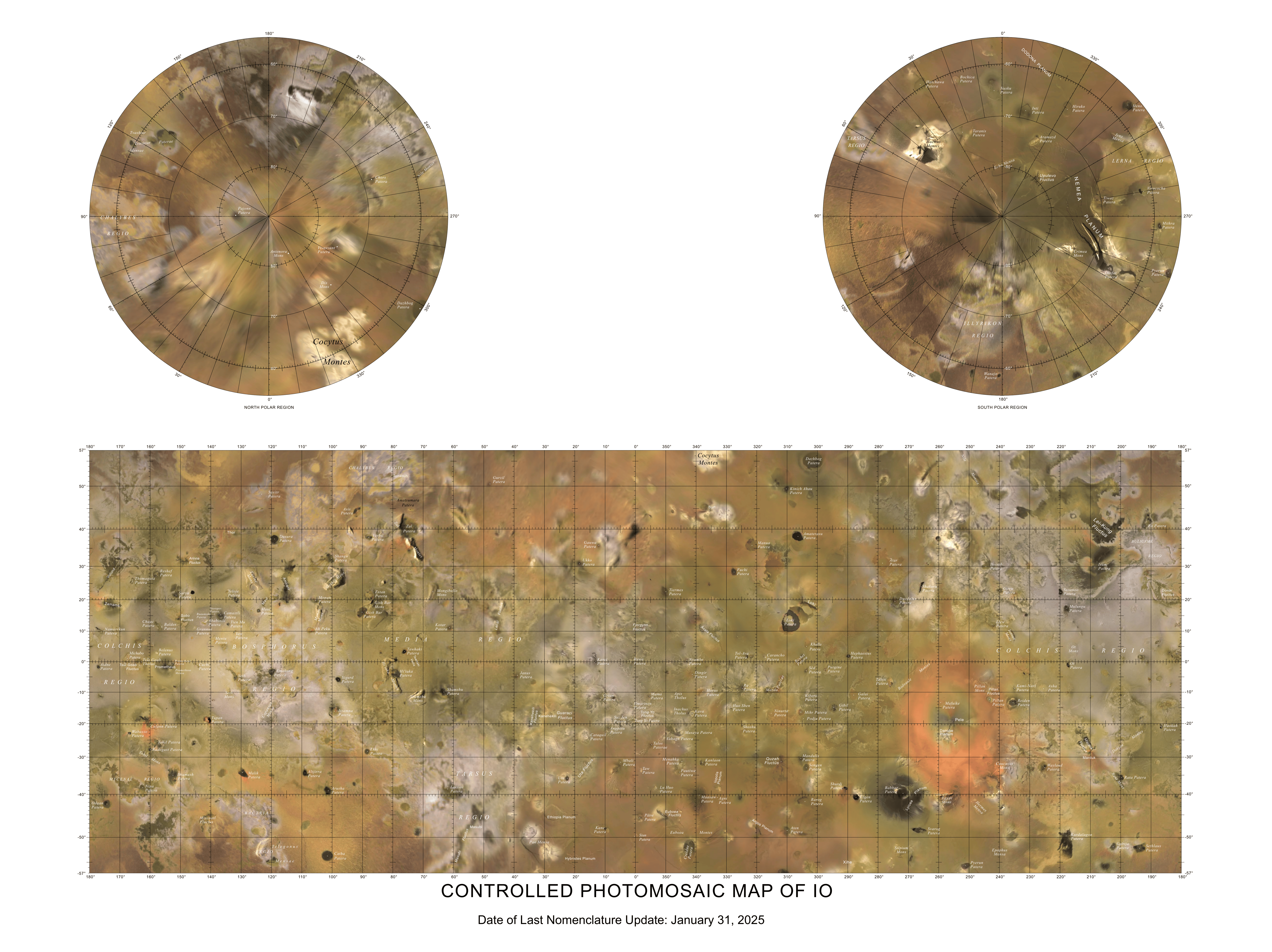
A complete map of Io's surface with labels.

Regio	Pronunciation	Named after	Coordinates	Size
Bactria Regio	/ˈbæktriə/	Bactria	47.6°S 123.77°W	665.68 km
Bosphorus Regio	/ˈbɒsfərəs/	Bosphorus	1.58°S 120.5°W	1,615.15 km
Bulicame Regio		Bulicame (The Divine Comedy)	34.85°N 190.82°W	498.0 km
Chalybes Regio	/ˈkælɪbiːz/	Chalybes	57.5°N 86.21°W	760.56 km
Colchis Regio	/ˈkɒlkɪs/	Colchis	1.63°N 205.01°W	2,373.09 km
Illyrikon Regio	/ɪˈlɪərɪkɒn/	Illyria	69.85°S 169.04°W	750.0 km
Lerna Regio	/ˈlɜːrnə/	Lerna	62.35°S 291.86°W	581.26 km
Media Regio	/ˈmiːdiə/	Media	8.65°N 59.43°W	2,654.02 km
Mycenae Regio	/maɪˈsiːniː/	Mycenae	36.07°S 165.39°W	600.16 km
Tarsus Regio	/ˈtɑːrsəs/	Tarsus	39.69°S 55.14°W	1,520.93 km

== Other regions on Io ==
Region	Named after	Coordinates	Size
Chaac-Camaxtli region	Chaac and Camaxtli paterae	12.5°N 145°W	
