= Tohil Mons =

Mountain on Io

Coordinates: 28.3°S 162.1°W

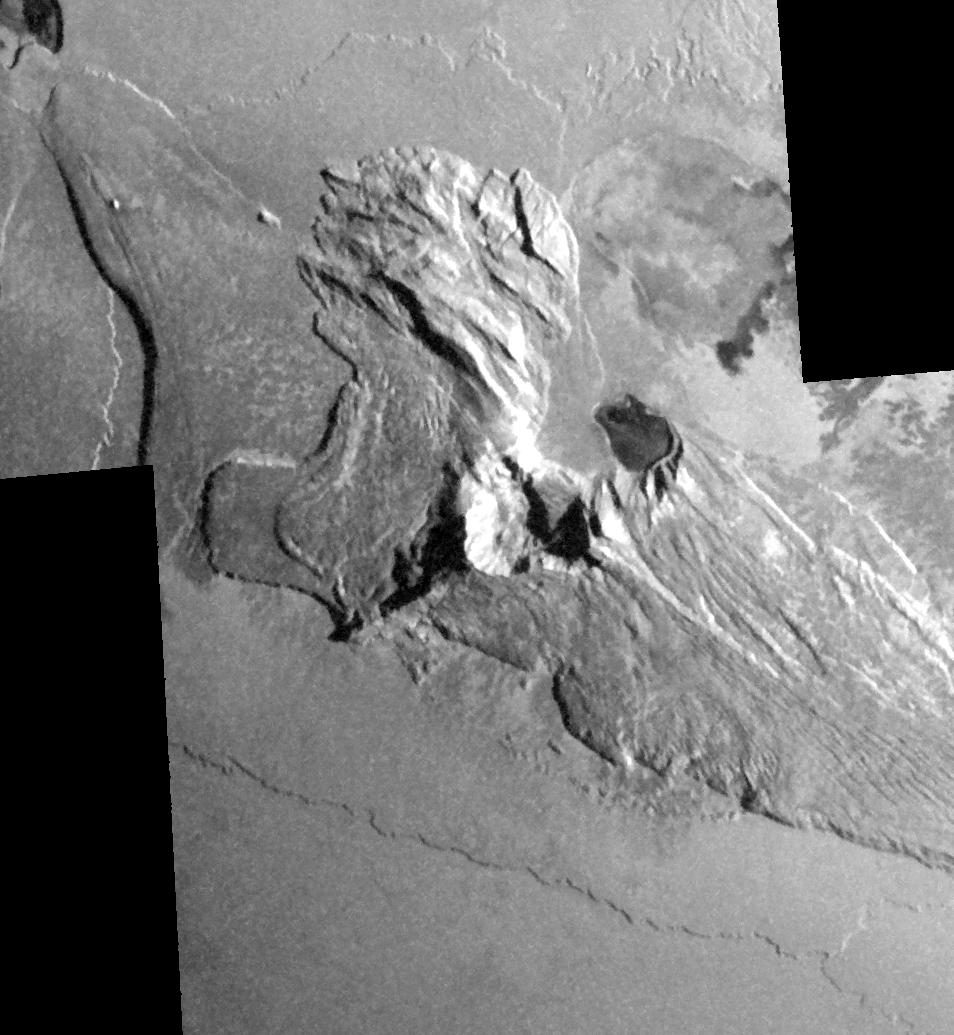
An aerial view of Tohil Mons crater

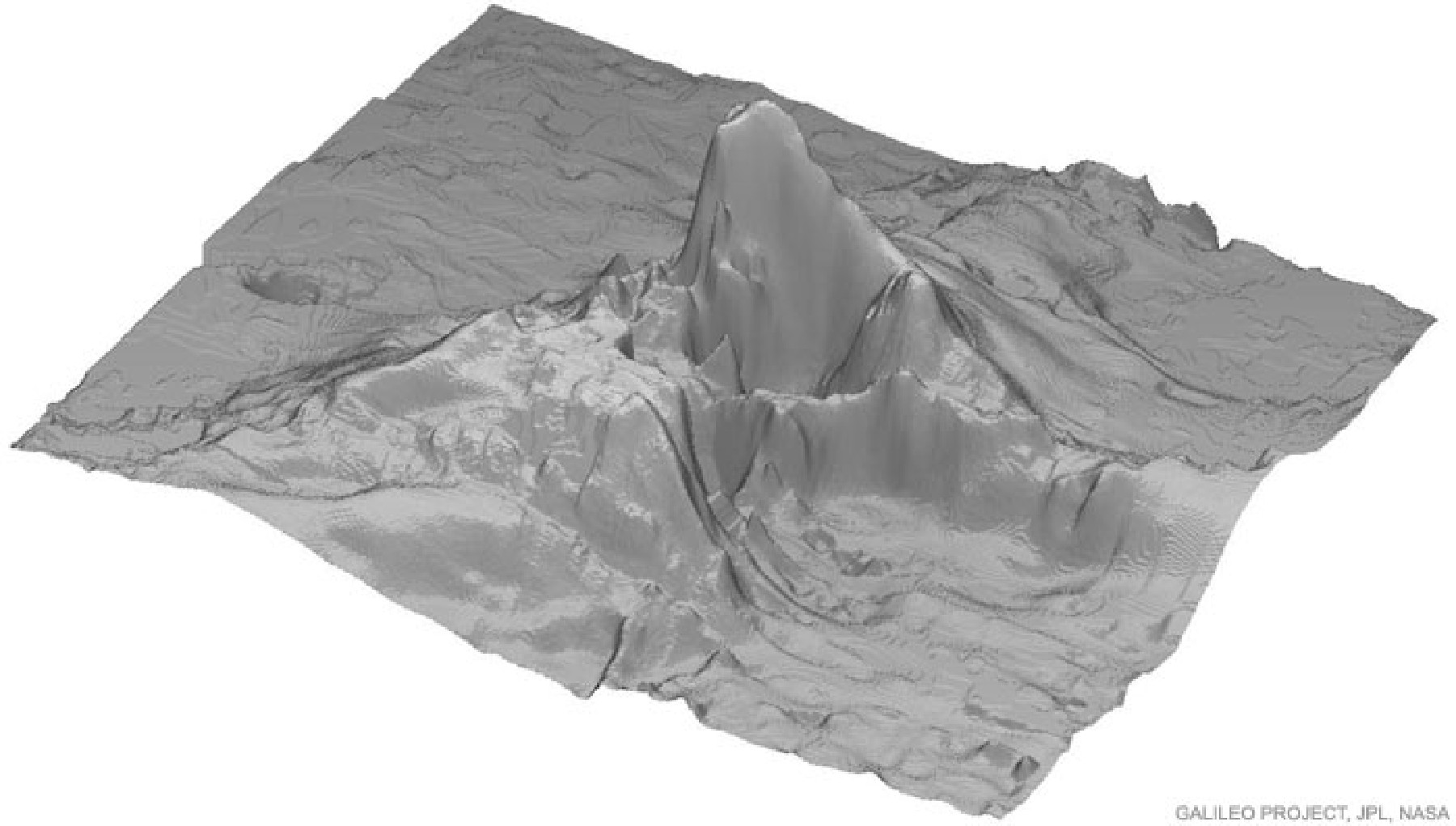
Topography of Tohil Mons, based on data from the spacecraft Galileo

Tohil Mons is a mountain on Io, one of Jupiter's moons. It stands at 5400 m (18,000 feet) and is located in the Culann–Tohil region of Io's antijovian hemisphere. It was named after the Mayan weather god Tohil.

Tohil Mons is one of the most geologically complex mountains in the Solar System as the mountain shows evidence of forming from other mountains through tectonic and erosional processes, in combination with silicate volcanic rock or magma activity.

The main massif of Tohil Mons has ridges and grooves, which indicate the presence of materials that have been tectonically displaced, including younger mottled crustal materials that were displaced during mass wasting processes.

The area between the mountain and the nearby volcanoes, Radegast Patera and Tohil Patera contain a number of dark and white silicate flows, which are thought to be lava ponds or small lava lakes.

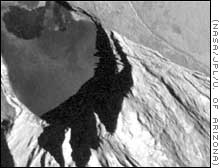
Radegast Patera

Topographical studies of the terrain indicate that there is less than 1 km of relief in the Culann–Tohil region and that there is no discernible correlation between centers of active volcanism and topography.
