= Exploration of Io =

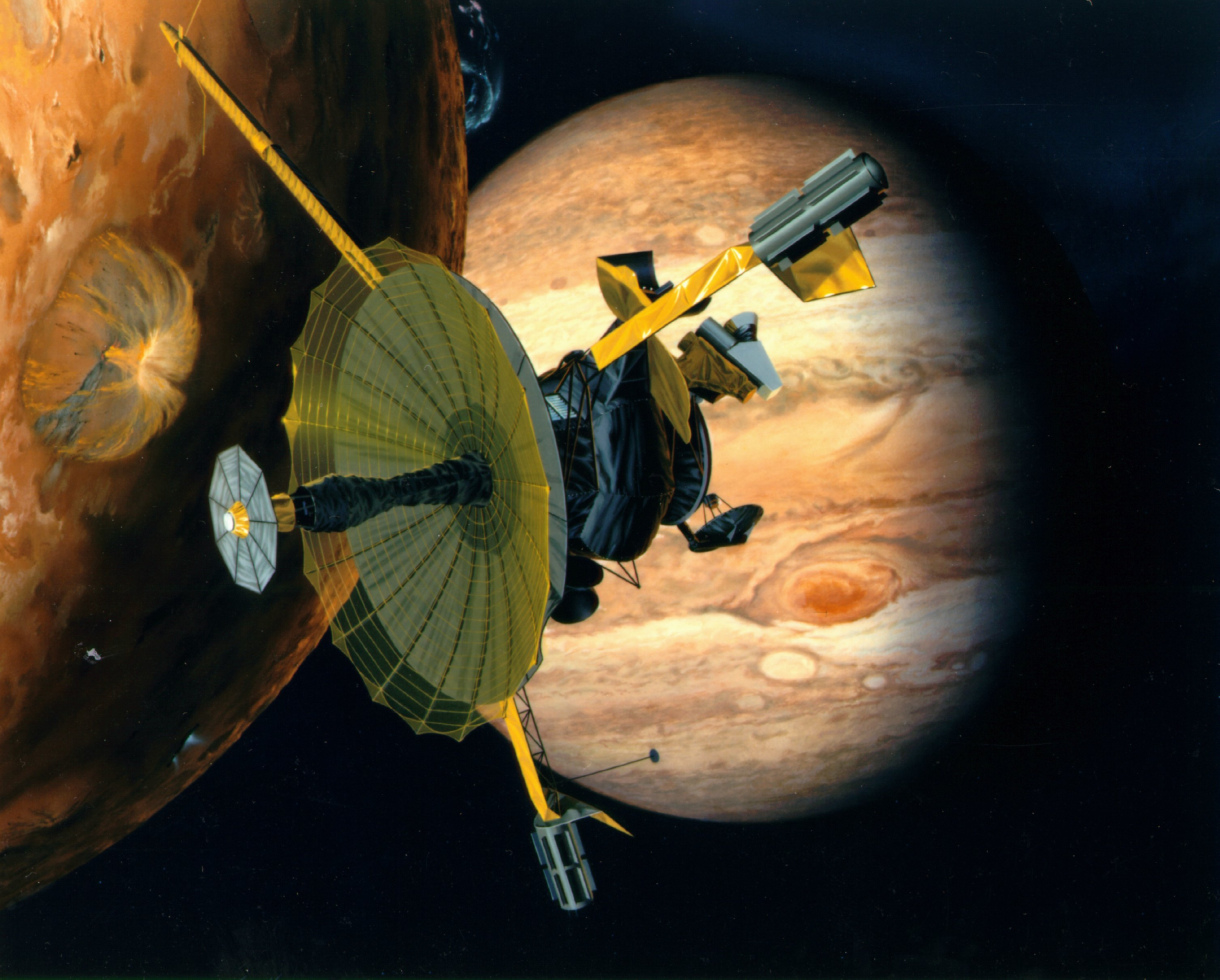
Painting illustrating a flyby of Io by the Galileo spacecraft

The exploration of Io, Jupiter's innermost Galilean and third-largest moon, began with its discovery in 1610 and continues today with Earth-based observations and visits by spacecraft to the Jupiter system. Italian astronomer Galileo Galilei was the first to record an observation of Io on January 8, 1610, though Simon Marius may have also observed Io at around the same time. During the 17th century, observations of Io and the other Galilean satellites helped with the measurement of longitude by map makers and surveyors, with validation of Kepler's Third Law of planetary motion, and with measurement of the speed of light. Based on ephemerides produced by astronomer Giovanni Cassini and others, Pierre-Simon Laplace created a mathematical theory to explain the resonant orbits of three of Jupiter's moons, Io, Europa, and Ganymede. This resonance was later found to have a profound effect on the geologies of these moons. Improved telescope technology in the late 19th and 20th centuries allowed astronomers to resolve large-scale surface features on Io as well as to estimate its diameter and mass.

The advent of uncrewed spaceflight in the 1950s and 1960s provided an opportunity to observe Io up-close. In the 1960s the moon's effect on Jupiter's magnetic field was discovered. The flybys of the two Pioneer probes, Pioneer 10 and 11 in 1973 and 1974, provided the first accurate measurement of Io's mass and size. Data from the Pioneers also revealed an intense belt of radiation near Io and suggested the presence of an atmosphere. In 1979, the two Voyager spacecraft flew through the Jupiter system. Voyager 1, during its encounter in March 1979, observed active volcanism on Io for the first time and mapped its surface in great detail, particularly the side that faces Jupiter. The Voyagers observed the Io plasma torus and Io's sulfur dioxide (SO_{2}) atmosphere for the first time. NASA launched the Galileo spacecraft in 1989, which entered Jupiter's orbit in December 1995. Galileo allowed detailed study of both the planet and its satellites, including six flybys of Io between late 1999 and early 2002 that provided high-resolution images and spectra of Io's surface, confirming the presence of high-temperature silicate volcanism on Io. Distant observations by Galileo allowed planetary scientists to study changes on the surface that resulted from the moon's active volcanism.

In 2016, Juno arrived at Jupiter, and while the mission was designed to study Jupiter's atmosphere and interior, it has performed several distant observations of Io using its visible-light telescope, JunoCAM, and its near-infrared spectrometer and imager, JIRAM.

NASA and the European Space Agency (ESA) have made plans to return to the Jupiter system in the 2020s. ESA launched the Jupiter Icy Moon Explorer (Juice) to explore Ganymede, Europa, and Callisto in 2023, while NASA launched the Europa Clipper in 2024. Both will arrive in the Jupiter system in the late 2020s and early 2030s and should be able to acquire distant observations of Io. The proposed NASA Discovery mission Io Volcano Observer, currently going through a competitive process to be selected, would explore Io as its primary mission. In the meantime, Io continues to be observed by the Hubble Space Telescope as well as by Earth-based astronomers using improved telescopes such as Keck and the European Southern Observatory.

== Discovery: 1610 ==
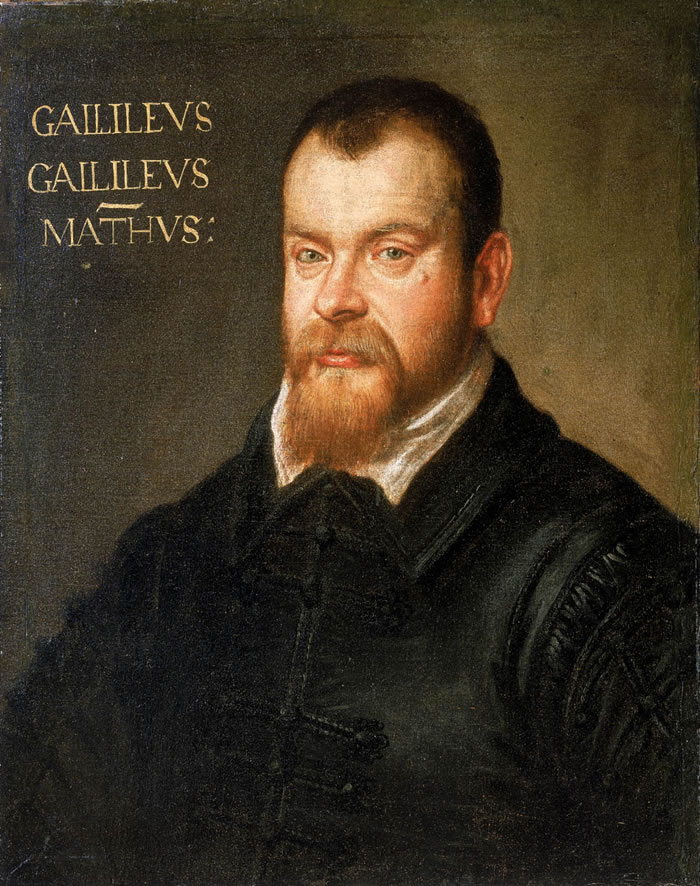
Galileo Galilei, the discoverer of Io

The first recorded observation of Io was made by Tuscan astronomer Galileo Galilei on January 7, 1610 using a 20x-power, refracting telescope at the University of Padua in the Republic of Venice. The discovery was made possible by the invention of the telescope in the Netherlands a little more than a year earlier and by Galileo's innovations to improve the magnification of the new instrument. During his observation of Jupiter on the evening of January 7, Galileo spotted two stars to the east of Jupiter and another one to the west. Jupiter and these three stars appeared to be in a line parallel to the ecliptic. The star furthest to the east from Jupiter turned out to be Callisto while the star to the west of Jupiter was Ganymede. The third star, the closest one to the east of Jupiter, was a combination of the light from Io and Europa as Galileo's telescope, while having a high magnification for a telescope from his time, was too low-powered to separate the two moons into distinct points of light. Galileo observed Jupiter the next evening, January 8, 1610, this time seeing three stars to the west of Jupiter, suggesting that Jupiter had moved to the west of the three stars. During this observation, the three stars in a line to the west of Jupiter were (from east to west): Io, Europa, and Ganymede. This was the first time that Io and Europa were observed and recorded as distinct points of light so this date, January 8, 1610 is used as the discovery date for the two moons by the International Astronomical Union. Galileo continued to observe the Jupiter system for the next month and a half. On January 13, Galileo observed all four of what would later be known as the Galilean moons of Jupiter for the first time in a single observation, though he had observed all four at various times in the preceding days. On January 15, he observed the motions of three of these satellites, including Io, and came to the conclusions that these objects were not background stars, but were in fact, "three stars in the heavens moving about Jupiter, as Venus and Mercury round the Sun." These were the first moons of a planet other than the Earth to be discovered.

The discoveries of Io and the other Galilean satellites of Jupiter were published in Galileo's Sidereus Nuncius in March 1610. While the Jovian moons he discovered would later be known as the Galilean satellites, after himself, he proposed the name Medicea Sidera (Medicean Stars) after his new patrons, the de'Medici family of his native Florence. Initially, he proposed the name Cosmica Sidera (Cosmic Stars), after the head of the family, Cosimo II de' Medici, however both Cosimo and Galileo decided on the change to honor the family as a whole. However, Galileo did not name each of the four moons individually beyond a numerical system in which Io was referred to as Jupiter I. By December 1610, thanks to the publication of Sidereus Nuncius, the news of Galileo's discovery had spread throughout Europe. With high-powered telescopes like Galileo's becoming more available, other astronomers, such as Thomas Harriot in England, Nicolas-Claude Fabri de Peiresc and Joseph Gaultier de la Vallette in France, Johannes Kepler in Bavaria, and Christopher Clavius in Rome, were able to observe Io and the other Medicean Stars during fall and winter of 1610–1611.

In his book Mundus Iovialis ("The World of Jupiter"), published in 1614, Simon Marius, the court astronomer to the Margraves of Brandenburg-Ansbach, claimed to have discovered Io and the other moons of Jupiter in 1609, one week before Galileo's discovery. According to Marius, he began observing the Jupiter system in late November 1609. He continued to observe the moons of Jupiter through December 1609, but did not record his observations until December 29, 1609 when he came to the conclusion "that these stars moved round Jupiter, just as the five solar planets, Mercury, Venus, Mars, Jupiter, and Saturn revolve round the Sun." However, Marius' observations were dated based on the Julian calendar, which was 10 days behind the Gregorian calendar used by Galileo. So Marius' first recorded observation from December 29, 1609 equates to Galileo's second observation of the Jupiter system on January 8, 1610. Galileo doubted this claim and dismissed the work of Marius as plagiarism. Given that Galileo published his work before Marius and that his first recorded observation came one day before Marius', Galileo is credited with the discovery. Despite this, it is one of Marius' naming schemes for the moons of Jupiter that is regularly used today. Based on a suggestion from Johannes Kepler in October 1613, he proposed that each moon was given its own name based on the lovers of the Greek mythological Zeus or his Roman equivalent, Jupiter. He named the innermost large moon of Jupiter after the Greek mythological figure Io.

== Io as a tool: 1610–1809 ==
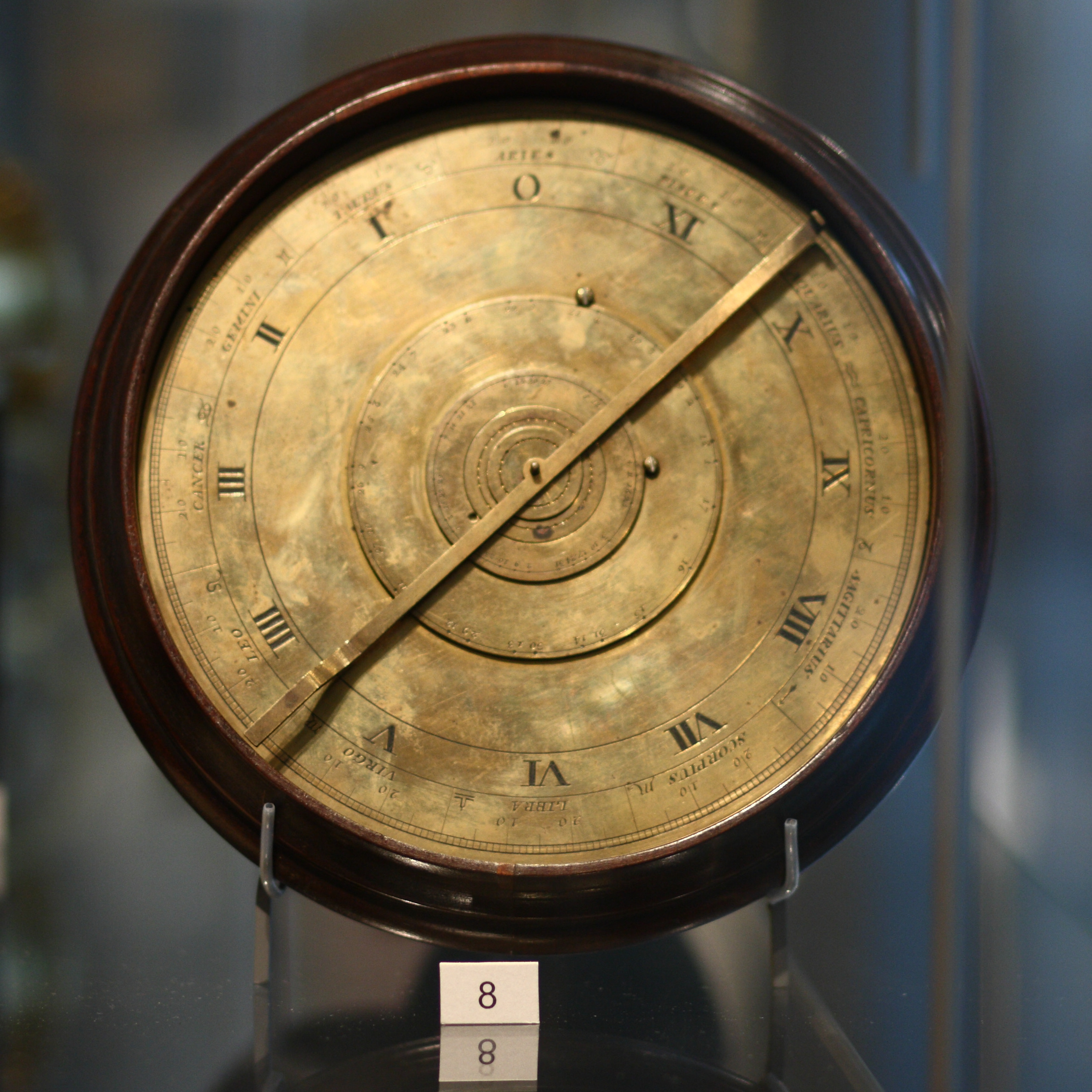
Dutch Orrery of the Jovian system, built c. 1750, used by Harvard professor John Winthrop

For the next two and a half centuries, because of the satellite's small size and distance, Io remained a featureless, 5th-magnitude point of light in astronomers' telescopes. So, the determination of its orbital period, along with those of the other Galilean satellites, was an early focus for astronomers. By June 1611, Galileo himself had determined that Io's orbital period was 42.5 hours long, only 2.5 minutes longer than the modern estimate. Simon Marius' estimate was only one minute longer in the data published in Mundus Iovalis. The orbital periods generated for Io and the other Jovian satellites provided an additional validation for Kepler's Third Law of planetary motion.

From these estimates of the orbital periods of Io and the other Galilean moons, astronomers hoped to generate ephemeris tables predicting the positions of each moon with respect to Jupiter, as well as when each moon would transit the face of Jupiter or be eclipsed by it. One benefit of such predictions, particularly those of satellite eclipses by Jupiter since they were subject to less observer error, would be determining an observer's longitude on Earth with respect to the prime meridian. By observing an eclipse of a Jovian satellite, an observer could determine the current time at the prime meridian by looking up the eclipse in an ephemeris table. Io was particularly useful for this purpose since its shorter orbital period and closer distance to Jupiter made eclipses more frequent and less affected by Jupiter's axial tilt. Knowing the time at the prime meridian and the local time, the observer's longitude could then be calculated. Galileo attempted to produce a table predicting the positions of the Jovian satellites and eclipse timings after he negotiated first with Spain and then with The Netherlands to create a system for measuring longitude at sea using eclipse timings. However, he was never able to generate accurate predictions far enough ahead in time to be useful so he never published his tables. This left the tables published by Simon Marius in Mundus Iovialis and Giovanni Battista Hodierna in 1654 as the most accurate ephemeris tables available, even though they too were unable to predict the moons' positions with sufficient accuracy.

Giovanni Cassini published a much more accurate ephemeris table in 1668 using his observations from the previous 16 years. Using this table, Cassini generated a more accurate map of France by observing eclipses of the Jovian satellites at various locations across the country. This showed that previous maps had depicted some shorelines as extending farther than they really did, which caused the apparent area of France to shrink, and led King Louis XIV to comment that "he was losing more territory to his astronomers than to his enemies." Eclipse timings of the Jovian moons would continue to be used to determine longitude for another hundred years for tasks such as surveying the Mason–Dixon line and geodesy measurements. Efforts were made to utilize this method for marine navigation, but it proved to be impossible to make the necessary observations with sufficient accuracy from the moving deck of a ship; it would not be until the invention of the marine chronometer in the mid-18th century that determining longitude at sea became practical.

Animation showing the Laplace resonance between Io, Europa and Ganymede (conjunctions are highlighted by color changes)

Plot of vertical position y vs time t of the animation above

During the 17th and 18th centuries astronomers used the ephemeris tables generated by Cassini to better understand the nature of the Jovian system and light. In 1675, Danish astronomer Ole Rømer found that observed eclipse times for Io were earlier than predicted when Jupiter was closest to Earth at opposition and later than predicted when Jupiter was furthest from Earth at conjunction. He determined that these discrepancies were due to light having a finite speed. Ole Rømer never published his findings, but he sent along his measurements to Dutch mathematician Christiaan Huygens. Huygens used Rømer's estimate of 22 minutes for light to traverse the diameter of the Earth's orbit to calculate that light traveled 220,000 km/s, 26% less than the modern value. Using Ole Rømer's data and a modern value for the astronomical unit, his measurement that light takes 16.44 minutes to travel the distance of the diameter of Earth's orbit was only 2% greater than the modern-day value, though this was not calculated at the time. In 1809, again making use of observations of Io, but this time with the benefit of more than a century of increasingly precise observations, the French astronomer Jean Baptiste Joseph Delambre reported the time for light to travel from the Sun to the Earth as 8 minutes and 12 seconds. Depending on the value assumed for the astronomical unit, this yields the speed of light as just a little more than 300,000 kilometers (186,000 mi) per second.

In 1788, Pierre-Simon Laplace used Cassini's ephemerides and those produced by other astronomers in the preceding century to create a mathematical theory explaining the resonant orbits of Io, Europa, and Ganymede. The ratios of the orbital periods of the inner three Galilean moons are simple integers: Io orbits Jupiter twice every time Europa orbits once, and four times for each revolution by Ganymede; this is sometimes referred to as the Laplace resonance. Laplace also found that the slight difference between these exact ratios and reality was due to their mean motions accounting for the precession of the periapse for Io and Europa. This resonance was later found to have a profound effect on the geologies of the three moons.

== Io as a world: 1805–1973 ==
Simulation of a transit of Jupiter by Io. Io's shadow precedes Io on Jupiter's cloud tops.

Improved telescopes and mathematical techniques allowed astronomers in the 19th and 20th centuries to estimate many of Io's physical properties, such as its mass, diameter, and albedo, as well as to resolve large-scale surface features on it. In his 1805 book Celestial Mechanics, in addition to laying out his mathematical argument for the resonant orbits of Io, Europa, and Ganymede, Laplace was able to use perturbations on the orbit of Io by Europa and Ganymede to provide the first estimate of Io's mass, 1.73 × 10^{−5} of the mass of Jupiter, which was one-quarter of the modern value. Through the mid-20th century, additional mass estimates using this technique would be performed by Marie-Charles Damoiseau, John Couch Adams, Ralph Allen Sampson, and Willem de Sitter, all of which were less than the modern value with the closest being Sampson's 1921 estimate of 4.5 × 10^{−5} of the mass of Jupiter, which was 4% less than the currently accepted mass. Io's diameter was estimated using micrometer measurements and occultations of background stars by Io. Edward E. Barnard used a micrometer at the Lick Observatory in 1897 to estimate a diameter of 3,950 km (2,450 mi), 8.5% larger than the accepted modern value, while Albert A. Michelson, also using the Lick telescope, came up with a better estimate of 3,844 km (2,389 mi). The best pre-spacecraft estimate of Io's diameter and shape came from the observations of an occultation of the star Beta Scorpii C on May 14, 1971, where a diameter of 3,636 km (2,259 mi) was found, slightly less the accepted modern value. These measurements allowed astronomers to estimate Io's density, given as 2.88 g/cm^{3} following the Beta Scorpii occultation. While this is 20% less than the currently accepted value, it was enough for astronomers to note the differences between the densities of the inner two Galilean satellites (Io and Europa) versus the outer two Galilean satellites (Ganymede and Callisto). The densities of Io and Europa suggested that they were composed primarily of rock while Ganymede and Callisto contained more ices.

Beginning in the 1890s, larger telescopes allowed astronomers to directly observe large scale features on the surfaces of the Galilean satellites including Io. In 1892, William Pickering measured Io's shape using a micrometer, and similar to his measurement of Ganymede, found it to have an elliptical outline aligned with the direction of its orbital motion. Other astronomers between 1850 and 1895 noted Io's elliptical shape. Edward Barnard observed Io while it transited across the face of Jupiter, finding the poles of Io to be dark compared to a brighter equatorial band. Initially, Barnard concluded that Io was in fact a binary of two dark bodies, but observations of additional transits against Jovian cloud bands of different brightness and the round shape of Io's shadow on the Jovian cloud tops caused him to change his interpretation. The egg-shape of Io reported by Pickering was the result of measuring only the bright equatorial band of Io, and mistaking the dark poles for background space. Later telescopic observations confirmed Io's distinct reddish-brown polar regions and yellow-white equatorial band. Observations of variations in the brightness of Io as it rotated, made by Joel Stebbins in the 1920s, showed that Io's day was the same length as its orbital period around Jupiter, thus proving that one side always faced Jupiter just as the Moon's near-side always faces the Earth. Stebbins also noted Io's dramatic orange coloration, which was unique among the Galilean satellites. Audouin Dollfus used observations of Io in the early 1960s at the Pic du Midi Observatory to create crude maps of the satellite that showed a patchwork of bright and dark spots across the Ionian surface, as well as a bright equatorial belt and dark polar regions.

Telescopic observations in the mid-20th century began to hint at Io's unusual nature. The near-infrared spectroscopy suggested that Io's surface was devoid of water ice. The lack of water on Io was consistent with the moon's estimated density, although, abundant water ice was found on the surface of Europa, a moon thought to have the same density as Io. Lee concluded that the spectrum was consistent with the presence of sulfur compounds. Binder and Cruikshank (1964) reported that Io's surface was brighter coming out of Jupiter's shadow than when it entered it. The authors suggested that this anomalous brightening after an eclipse was the result of an atmosphere partially freezing out onto the surface during the eclipse darkness with the frost slowly sublimating away after the eclipse. Attempts to confirm this result met with mixed results: some researchers reported a post-eclipse brightening, while others did not. Later modeling of Io's atmosphere would show that such brightening would only be possible if Io's SO_{2} atmosphere froze out enough to produce a layer several millimeters thick, which seemed unlikely. Radio telescopic observations revealed Io's influence on the Jovian magnetosphere, as demonstrated by decametric wavelength bursts tied to the orbital period of Io (Io-DAM), suggesting an electrodynamic coupling between the two worlds.

== Pioneer era: 1973–1979 ==
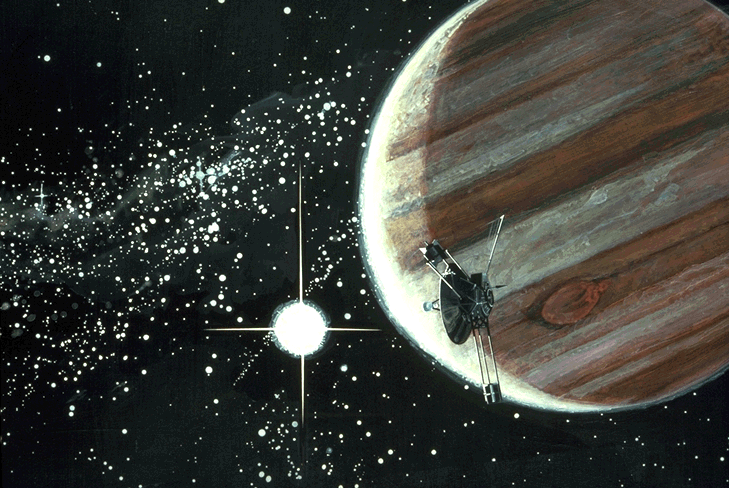
Artist's rendition of the Pioneer 10 encounter with Jupiter

In the late 1960s, a concept known as the Planetary Grand Tour was developed in the United States by NASA and the Jet Propulsion Laboratory (JPL). It would allow a single spacecraft to travel past the asteroid belt and onto each of the outer planets, including Jupiter, if the mission was launched in 1976 or 1977. However, there was uncertainty over whether a spacecraft could survive passage through the asteroid belt, where micrometeoroids could cause it physical damage, or the intense Jovian magnetosphere, where charged particles could harm sensitive electronics. To resolve these questions before sending the more ambitious Voyager missions, NASA and the Ames Research Center launched a pair of twin probes, Pioneer 10 and Pioneer 11 on March 3, 1972 and April 6, 1973, respectively, on the first uncrewed mission to the outer Solar System.

Pioneer 10 became the first spacecraft to reach the Jupiter system on December 3, 1973. It passed within 357,000 km (222,000 mi) of Io. During Pioneer 10's fly-by of Io, the spacecraft performed a radio occultation experiment by transmitting an S-band signal as Io passed between it and Earth. A slight attenuation of the signal before and after the occultation showed that Io had an ionosphere, suggesting the presence of a thin atmosphere with a pressure of 1.0 × 10^{−7} bar, though the composition was not determined. This was the second atmosphere to be discovered around a moon of an outer planet, after Saturn's moon Titan. Close-up images using Pioneer's Imaging Photopolarimeter were planned as well, but were lost because of the high-radiation environment. Pioneer 10 also discovered a hydrogen ion torus at the orbit of Io.

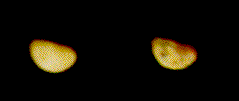
Only image of Io returned from Pioneer 11

Pioneer 11 encountered the Jupiter system nearly one year later on December 2, 1974, approaching to within 314,000 km (195,000 mi) of Io. Pioneer 11 provided the first spacecraft image of Io, a 357 km (222 mi) per pixel frame (D7) over Io's north polar region taken from a distance of 470,000 km (290,000 mi). This low-resolution image revealed dark patches on Io's surface akin to those hinted at in maps by Audouin Dollfus. Observations by both Pioneers revealed that Jupiter and Io were connected by an electrical conduit known as the Io flux tube, which consists of magnetic field lines trending from the Jupiter's poles to the satellite. Pioneer 11's closer encounter with Jupiter allowed the spacecraft to discover Jupiter's intense radiation belts similar to Earth's Van Allen Belts. One of the peaks in charged particle flux was found near the orbit of Io. Radio tracking during the encounters of both Pioneers with Io provided an improved estimate of the moon's mass. This was accomplished by analyzing slight changes in trajectory of the two probes due to the influence of Io's gravity and calculating the mass necessary to produce the deviations. When this estimate was combined with the best available information on Io's size, Io was found to have the highest density of the four Galilean satellites and that the densities of the four Galilean satellites trended downward with increasing distance from Jupiter. The high density of Io (3.5 g/cm^{3}) indicated that it was composed primarily of silicate rock rather than water ice.

Following the Pioneer encounters and in the lead up to the Voyager fly-bys in 1979, interest in Io and the other Galilean satellites grew, with the planetary science and astronomy communities going so far as to convene a week of dedicated Io observations by radio, visible, and infrared astronomers in November 1974 known as "Io Week." New observations of Io from Earth and by the Pioneers during the mid-1970s caused a paradigm shift in thinking about its surface chemistry and formation. The trend in the densities of the four Galilean satellites found by Pioneer 10 suggested that the satellites formed as part of a collapsing nebula, like a miniature version of what took place in the Solar System as a whole. The initial hot Jupiter prevented the condensation of water at the orbits of Io and Europa, leading those bodies to have higher densities than the outer two moons. Spectroscopic measurements of the light reflected from Io and its surrounding space were made with increasing spectral resolution during the 1970s, providing new insights into its surface composition. Other observations suggested that Io had a surface dominated by evaporites composed of sodium salts and sulfur. This was consistent with Io lacking water ice either on its surface or in its interior, in contrast with the other Galilean satellites. An absorption band near 560 nm was identified with the radiation-damaged form of the mineral halite. It was thought that deposits of the mineral on Io's surface were the origin of a cloud of sodium atoms surrounding Io, created through energetic-particle sputtering.

Measurements of Io's thermal radiation in the mid-infrared spectrum in the 1970s led to conflicting results that were not explained accurately until after the discovery of the active volcanism by Voyager 1 in 1979. An anomalously high thermal flux, compared to the other Galilean satellites, was observed at an infrared wavelength of 10 μm while Io was in Jupiter's shadow. At the time, this heat flux was attributed to the surface having a much higher thermal inertia than Europa and Ganymede. These results were considerably different from measurements taken at wavelengths of 20 μm which suggested that Io had similar surface properties to the other Galilean satellites. NASA researchers observed a sharp increase in Io's thermal emission at 5 μm on February 20, 1978, possibly due to an interaction between the satellite and Jupiter's magnetosphere, though volcanism was not ruled out.

A few days before the Voyager 1 encounter, Stan Peale, Patrick Cassen, and R. T. Reynolds published a paper in the journal Science predicting a volcanically modified surface and a differentiated interior, with distinct rock types rather than a homogeneous blend. They based this prediction on models of Io's interior that took into account the massive amount of heat produced by the varying tidal pull of Jupiter on Io resulting from Io's Laplace resonance with Europa and Ganymede not allowing its orbit to circularize. Their calculations suggested that the amount of heat generated for an Io with a homogeneous interior would be three times greater than the amount of heat generated by radioactive isotope decay alone. This effect would be even greater with a differentiated Io.

== Voyager era: 1979–1995 ==
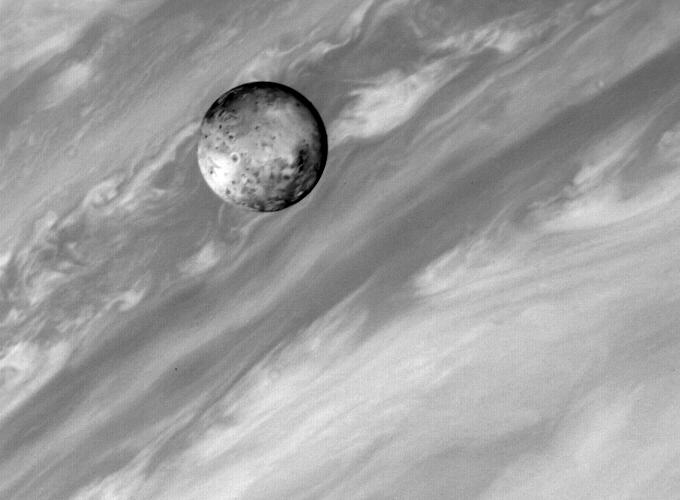
Voyager 1 approach image of Io, with Jupiter's clouds in the background

The first close-up investigation of Io using high-resolution imaging was performed by the twin probes, Voyager 1 and Voyager 2, launched on September 5 and August 20, 1977, respectively. These two spacecraft were part of NASA and JPL's Voyager program to explore the giant outer planets through a series of missions in the late 1970s and 1980s. This was a scaled-down version of the earlier Planetary Grand Tour concept. Both probes contained more sophisticated instrumentation than the previous Pioneer missions, including a camera capable of taking much higher resolution images. This was important for viewing the geologic features of Jupiter's Galilean moons as well as the cloud features of Jupiter itself. They also had spectrometers with a combined spectral range from the far-ultraviolet to the mid-infrared, useful for examining Io's surface and atmospheric composition and to search for thermal emission sources on its surface.

Voyager 1 was first of the two probes to encounter the Jupiter system in March 1979. On approach to Jupiter in late February and early March 1979, Voyager imaging scientists noticed that Io appeared distinct from the other Galilean satellites. Its surface was orange in color and marked by dark spots, which were initially interpreted as the sites of impact craters. Among the most intriguing features was a heart-shaped, dark ring 1,000 km (600 mi) across that would later turn out to be the plume deposit of the volcano Pele. The data from the Ultraviolet Spectrometer (UVS) revealed a torus of plasma composed of sulfur ions at the orbit of Io, but tilted to match the equator of Jupiter's magnetic field. The Low-Energy Charged Particle (LECP) detector encountered streams of sodium, sulfur, and oxygen ions prior to entering Jupiter's magnetosphere, material that the LECP science team suspected originated from Io. In the hours prior to Voyager 1's encounter with Io, the spacecraft acquired images for a global map with a resolution of at least 20 km (12 mi) per pixel over the satellite's leading hemisphere (the side that faces the moon's direction of motion around Jupiter) down to less than 1 km (0.6 mi) per pixel over portions of the sub-Jovian hemisphere (the "near" side of Io). The images returned during the approach revealed a strange, multi-colored landscape devoid of impact craters, unlike the other planetary surfaces imaged to that point such as the Moon, Mars, and Mercury. The dark spots in earlier images resembled volcanic calderas more than they did the impact craters seen on those other worlds. Stunned by the oddity of Io's surface, Voyager imaging scientist Laurence Soderblom at a pre-encounter press conference joked, "this one we got all figured out...[Io] is covered with thin candy shells of anything from sulfates and sulfur and salts to all kinds of strange things."

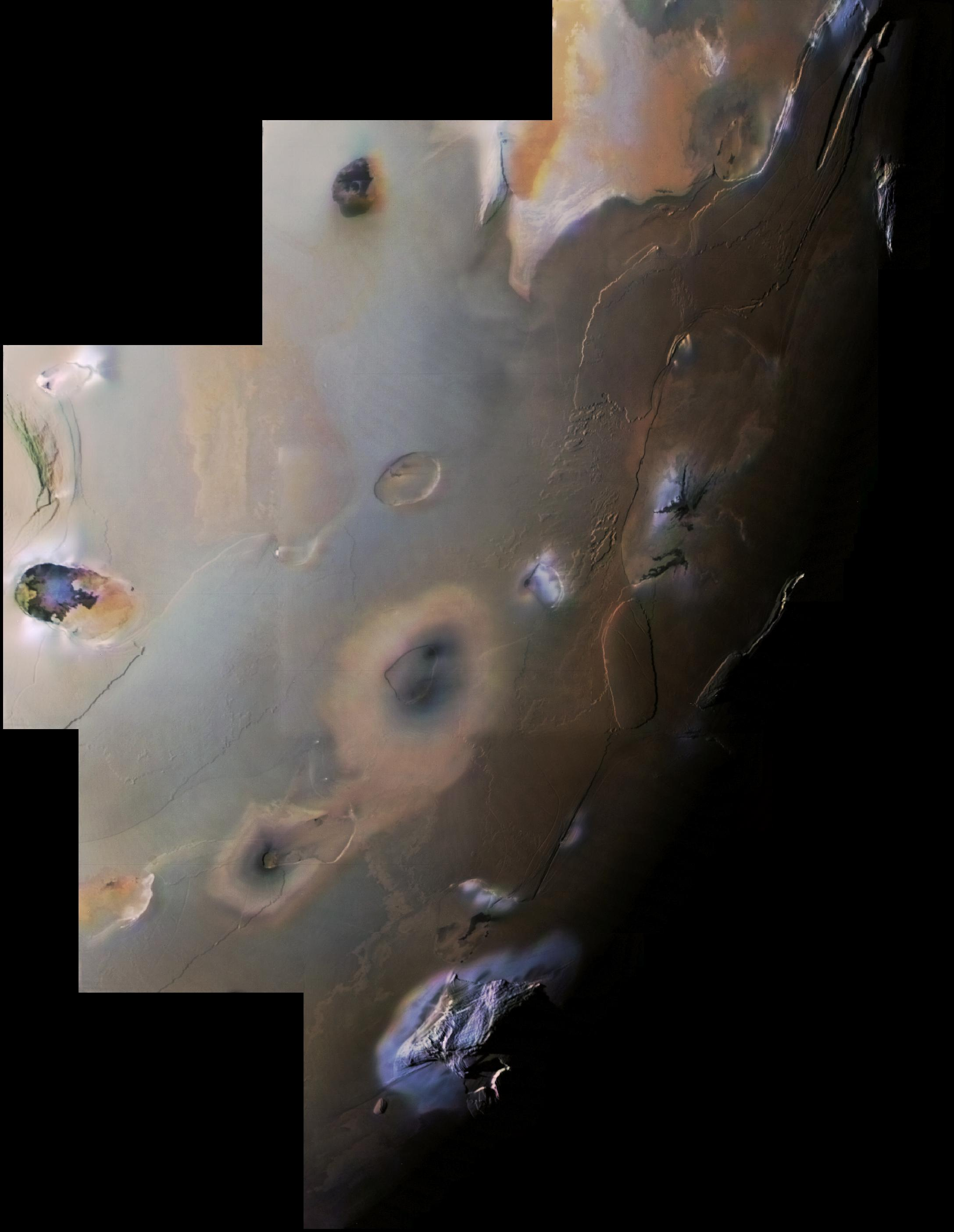
Mosaic of Voyager 1 images covering Io's south polar region

On March 5, 1979, Voyager 1 performed the closest encounter with Io of the Voyager mission from a distance of 20,600 km (12,800 mi) over its south pole. The close distance of the encounter allowed Voyager to acquire images of the sub-Jovian and south polar regions of Io with a best resolution of less than 0.5 km (0.3 mi) per pixel. Unfortunately, many of the close-up images were limited by smear as the result of problems with Voyager's internal clock due to the high radiation environment, causing some narrow-angle-camera exposures of Io to be acquired while the Voyager's scan platform was moving between targets. The highest-resolution images showed a relatively young surface punctuated by oddly shaped pits that appeared more akin to volcanic calderas than to impact craters, mountains taller than Mount Everest, and features resembling volcanic lava flows. The majority of the surface was covered in smooth, layered plains, with scarps marking the boundary between different layers. Even in the highest resolution images, no impact craters were observed, suggesting that Io's surface was being regularly renewed by the present-day volcanic activity. The encounter over one of Io's poles allowed Voyager 1 to directly sample the edge of the Io flux tube, finding an intense electric current of 5 × 10^{6} amperes. The color data from Voyager's cameras showed that Ionian surface was dominated by sulfur and sulfur dioxide (SO_{2}) frosts. Different surface colors were thought to correspond to distinct sulfur allotropes, caused by liquid sulfur being heated to different temperatures, changing its color and viscosity.

On March 8, 1979, three days after passing Jupiter, Voyager 1 took images of Jupiter's moons to help mission controllers determine the spacecraft's exact location, a process called optical navigation. While processing images of Io to enhance the visibility of background stars, navigation engineer Linda Morabito found a 300-kilometer (190 mi) tall cloud along the moon's limb. At first, she suspected the cloud to be a moon behind Io, but no suitably sized body would have been in that location. The feature was determined to be a plume generated by active volcanism at a dark depression later named Pele, the feature surrounded by a dark, footprint-shaped ring seen in approach images. Analysis of other Voyager 1 images showed nine such plumes scattered across the surface, proving that Io was volcanically active. The Infrared Interferometer Spectrometer (IRIS) on Voyager 1 discovered thermal emission from multiple sources, indicative of cooling lava. This showed that some of the lava flows visible on Io's surface were active. IRIS also measured gaseous SO_{2} within the Loki plume, providing additional evidence for an atmosphere on Io. These results confirmed the prediction made by Peale et al. shortly before the encounter.

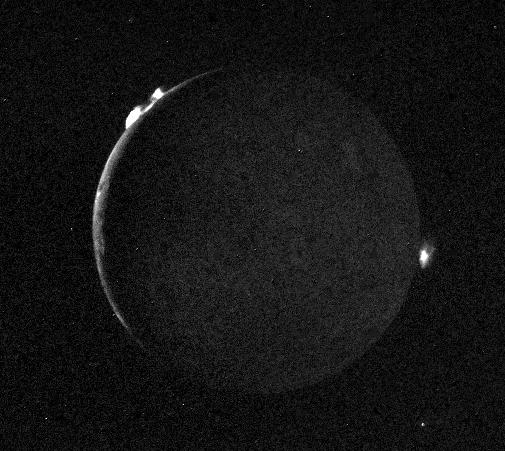
Three volcanic plumes seen by Voyager 2 along the limb of Io

Voyager 2 passed Io on July 9, 1979 at a distance of 1,130,000 km (702,000 mi), approaching Jupiter between the orbits of Europa and Ganymede. Though it did not approach nearly as close to Io as Voyager 1, comparisons between images taken by the two spacecraft showed several surface changes that had occurred in the four months between the encounters, including new plume deposits at Aten Patera and Surt. The Pele plume deposit had changed shape, from a heart-shape during the Voyager 1 encounter to an oval during the Voyager 2 flyby. Changes in the distribution of diffuse plume deposits and additional dark material were observed in the southern portion of Loki Patera, the consequence of a volcanic eruption there. As a result of the discovery of active volcanic plumes by Voyager 1, a ten-hour "Io Volcano Watch" was added to the departure leg of the Voyager 2 encounter to monitor Io's plumes. Observations of Io's crescent during this monitoring campaign revealed that seven of the nine plumes observed in March were still active in July 1979, with only the volcano Pele shutting down between flybys (no images were available to confirm continued activity at Volund), and no new plumes were observed. The blue color of the plumes observed (Amirani, Maui, Masubi, and Loki) suggested that the reflected light from them came from fine grained particles approximately 1 μm in diameter.

Just after the Voyager encounters, the accepted theory was that Io's lava flows were composed of sulfurous compounds. This was based on the color of volcanic terrains, and the low temperatures measured by the IRIS instrument (though IRIS was not sensitive to the high-temperatures associated with active silicate volcanism, where thermal emission peaks in the near-infrared). However, Earth-based infrared studies in the 1980s and 1990s shifted the paradigm from one of primarily sulfur volcanism to one where silicate volcanism dominates, and sulfur acts in a secondary role. In 1986, measurements of a bright eruption on Io's leading hemisphere revealed temperatures higher than the boiling point of sulfur, indicating a silicate composition for at least some of Io's lava flows. Similar temperatures were observed at the Surt eruption in 1979 between the two Voyager encounters, and at the eruption observed by NASA researchers in 1978. In addition, modeling of silicate lava flows on Io suggested that they cooled rapidly, causing their thermal emission to be dominated by lower temperature components, such as solidified flows, as opposed to the small areas covered by still-molten lava near the actual eruption temperature. Spectra from Earth-based observations confirmed the presence of an atmosphere at Io, with significant density variations across Io's surface. These measurements suggested that Io's atmosphere was produced by either the sublimation of sulfur dioxide frost, or from the eruption of gases at volcanic vents, or both.

== Galileo era: 1995–2003 ==
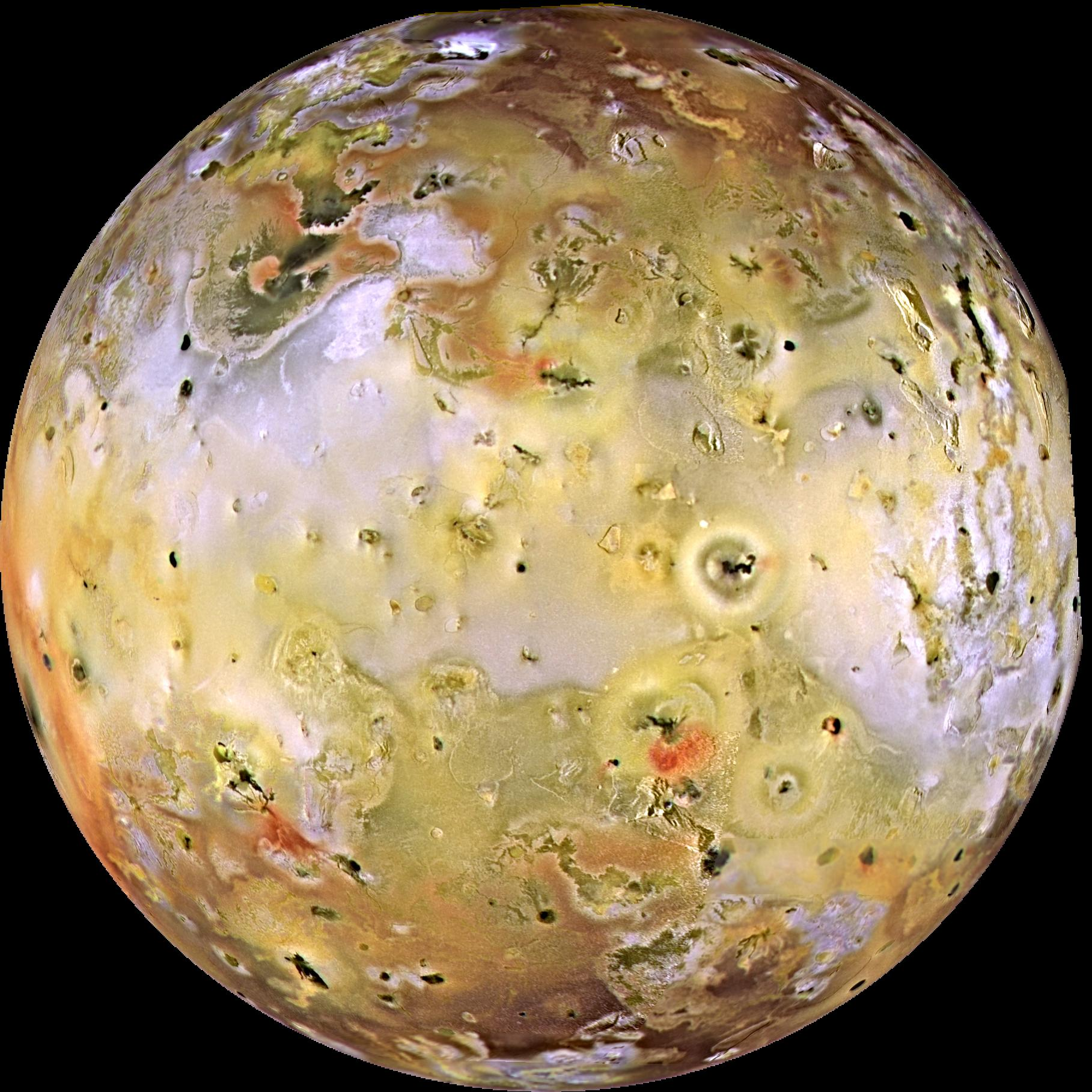
Mosaic of images from Galileo acquired in November 1996

Planning for the next NASA mission to Jupiter began in 1977, just as the two Voyager probes were launched. Rather than performing a flyby of the Jupiter system like all the missions preceding it, the Galileo spacecraft would orbit Jupiter to perform close-up observations of the planet and its many moons, including Io, as well as deliver a Jovian atmospheric probe. Originally scheduled to be launched via the Space Shuttle in 1982, delays resulting from development issues with the shuttle and upper-stage motor pushed the launch back, and in 1986 the Challenger disaster delayed Galileo's launch even further. Finally, on October 18, 1989, Galileo began its journey aboard the shuttle Atlantis. En route to Jupiter, the high-gain antenna, folded up like an umbrella to allow the spacecraft to fit in the shuttle cargo bay, failed to open completely. For the rest of the mission, data from the spacecraft would have to be transmitted back to Earth at a much lower data rate using the low-gain antenna. Despite this setback, data compression algorithms uploaded to Galileo allowed it to complete most of its science goals at Jupiter.

Galileo arrived at Jupiter on December 7, 1995, after a six-year journey from Earth during which it used gravity assists with Venus and Earth to boost its orbit out to Jupiter. Shortly before Galileo's Jupiter Orbit Insertion maneuver, the spacecraft performed the only targeted flyby of Io of its nominal mission. High-resolution images were originally planned during the encounter, but problems with the spacecraft's tape recorder, used to save data taken during encounters for later playback to Earth, required the elimination of high-data-rate observations from the flyby schedule to ensure the safe recording of Galileo atmospheric probe data. The encounter did yield significant results from lower data rate experiments. Analysis of the Doppler shift of Galileo's radio signal showed that Io is differentiated with a large iron core, similar to that found in the rocky planets of the inner Solar System. Magnetometer data from the encounter, combined with the discovery of an iron core, suggested that Io might have a magnetic field.

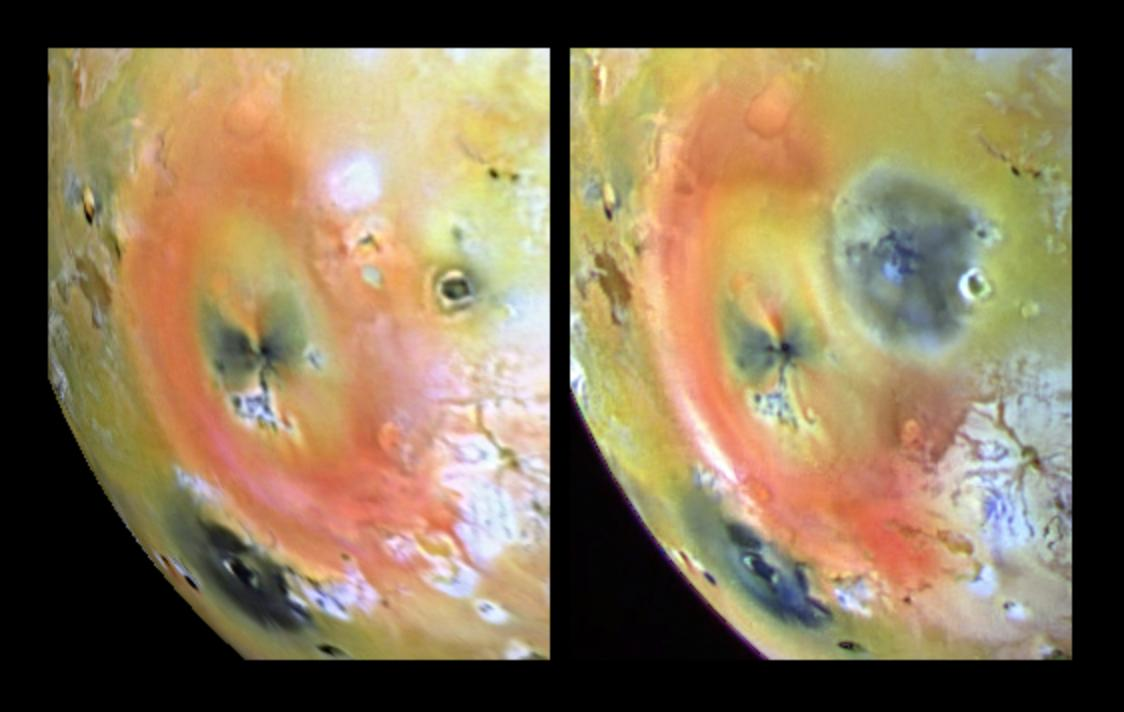
Two Galileo images showing the effects of a major eruption at Pillan Patera in 1997

Jupiter's intense radiation belts near the orbit of Io forced Galileo to come no closer than the orbit of Europa until the end of the first extended mission in 1999. Despite the lack of close-up imaging and mechanical problems that greatly restricted the amount of data returned, several significant discoveries at Io were made during Galileo's two-year, primary mission. During the first several orbits, Galileo mapped Io in search of surface changes that occurred since the Voyager encounters 17 years earlier. This included the appearance of a new lava flow, Zamama, and the shifting of the Prometheus plume by 75 km (47 mi) to the west, tracking the end of a new lava flow at Prometheus. Starting with Galileo's first orbit, the spacecraft's camera, the Solid-State Imager (SSI), began taking one or two images per orbit of Io while the moon was in Jupiter's shadow. This allowed Galileo to monitor high-temperature volcanic activity on Io by observing thermal emission sources across its surface. The same eclipse images also allowed Galileo scientists to observe aurorae created by the interaction between Io's atmosphere and volcanic plumes with the Io flux tube and the plasma torus. During Galileo's ninth orbit, the spacecraft observed a major eruption at Pillan Patera, detecting high-temperature thermal emission and a new volcanic plume. The temperatures observed at Pillan and other volcanoes confirmed that volcanic eruptions on Io consist of silicate lavas with magnesium-rich mafic and ultramafic compositions, with volatiles like sulfur and sulfur dioxide serving a similar role to water and carbon dioxide on Earth. During the following orbit, Galileo found that Pillan was surrounded by a new, dark pyroclastic deposit composed of silicate minerals such as orthopyroxene. The Near-Infrared Mapping Spectrometer (NIMS) observed Io on a number occasions during the primary mission, mapping its volcanic thermal emission and the distribution of sulfur dioxide frost, the absorption bands of which dominate Io's near-infrared spectrum.

Galileo encounters with Io with altitudes less than 300,000 km (186,000 mi)
Orbit	Date	Altitude		Notes
J0	December 7, 1995	897 km	557 mi	No remote sensing; Gravity measurements reveal differentiated interior, large iron core; magnetic field?
C3	November 4, 1996	244,000 km	152,000 mi	Clear-filter imaging of anti-Jovian hemisphere; near-IR spectra of SO_{2} frost
E14	March 29, 1998	252,000 km	157,000 mi	Multi-spectral imaging of anti-Jovian hemisphere
C21	July 2, 1999	127,000 km	78,900 mi	Global color mosaic of anti-Jovian hemisphere
I24	October 11, 1999	611 km	380 mi	High-resolution imaging of Pillan, Zamama, and Prometheus flows; Camera and Near-IR spectrometer suffer radiation damage
I25	November 26, 1999	301 km	187 mi	Spacecraft safing event precludes high-resolution observations; images of Tvashtar outburst eruption
I27	February 22, 2000	198 km	123 mi	Change detection at Amirani, Tvashtar, and Prometheus; Stereo imaging over Tohil Mons
I31	August 6, 2001	194 km	121 mi	Camera problems preclude high-resolution imaging; Near-IR spectrometer observes eruption at Thor
I32	October 16, 2001	184 km	114 mi	High-resolution observations of Thor, Tohil Mons, Gish Bar
I33	January 17, 2002	102 km	63 mi	Spacecraft safing event precludes observations; almost all remote sensing lost
A34	November 7, 2002	45,800 km	28,500 mi	No remote sensing due to budget constraints

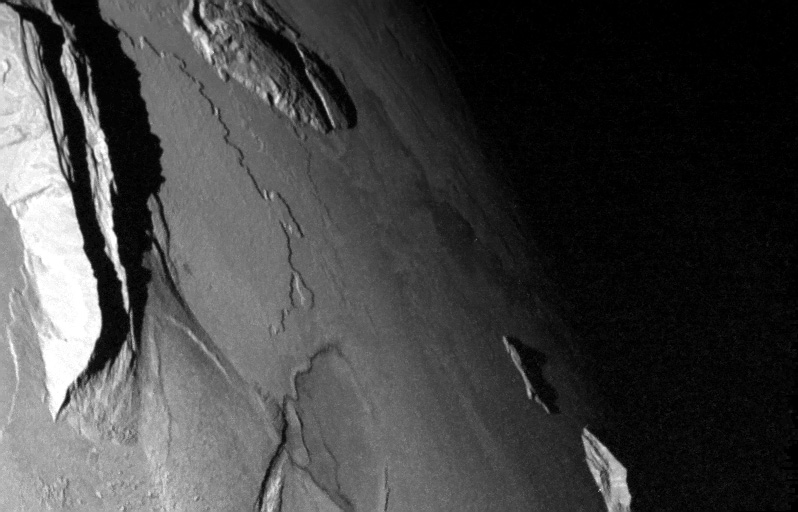
Mongibello Mons, as seen by Galileo in February 2000

In December 1997, NASA approved an extended mission for Galileo known as the Galileo Europa Mission, which ran for two years following the end of the primary mission. The focus of this extended mission was to follow up on the discoveries made at Europa with seven additional flybys to search for new evidence of a possible sub-surface water ocean. Starting in May 1999, Galileo used four flybys (20 to 23) with Callisto to lower its periapse, setting up a chance for it to fly by Io twice in late 1999. During Galileo's 21st orbit, it acquired a three-color, global mosaic of the anti-Jovian hemisphere (the "far" side of Io), its highest resolution observations of Io to date. This mosaic complemented the coverage obtained by Voyager 1, whose highest resolution observations covered Io's sub-Jovian hemisphere. Galileo's two flybys in late 1999, on October 11 and November 26, provided high-resolution images and spectra of various volcanoes and mountains on Io's anti-Jovian hemisphere. The camera suffered a problem with an image mode used extensively during the first encounter, causing the majority of images taken to be highly degraded (though a software algorithm was developed to partially recover some of these images). NIMS also had problems due to the high-radiation environment near Io, suffering a hardware failure that limited the number of near-infrared wavelengths it sampled. Finally, the imaging coverage was limited by the low-data rate playback (forcing Galileo to transmit data from each encounter days to weeks later on the apoapse leg of each orbit), and by an incident when radiation forced a reset of the spacecraft's computer putting it into safe mode during the November 1999 encounter. Even so, Galileo fortuitously imaged an outburst eruption at Tvashtar Paterae during the November flyby, observing a curtain of lava fountains 25 km (16 mi) long and 1.5 km (0.93 mi) high. An additional encounter was performed on February 22, 2000. With no new errors with Galileo's remote sensing instruments, no safing events, and more time after the flyby before the next satellite encounter, Galileo was able to acquire and send back more data. This included information on the lava flow rate at Prometheus, Amirani, and Tvashtar, very high resolution imaging of Chaac Patera and layered terrain in Bulicame Regio, and mapping of the mountains and topography around Camaxtli Patera, Zal Patera, and Shamshu Patera.

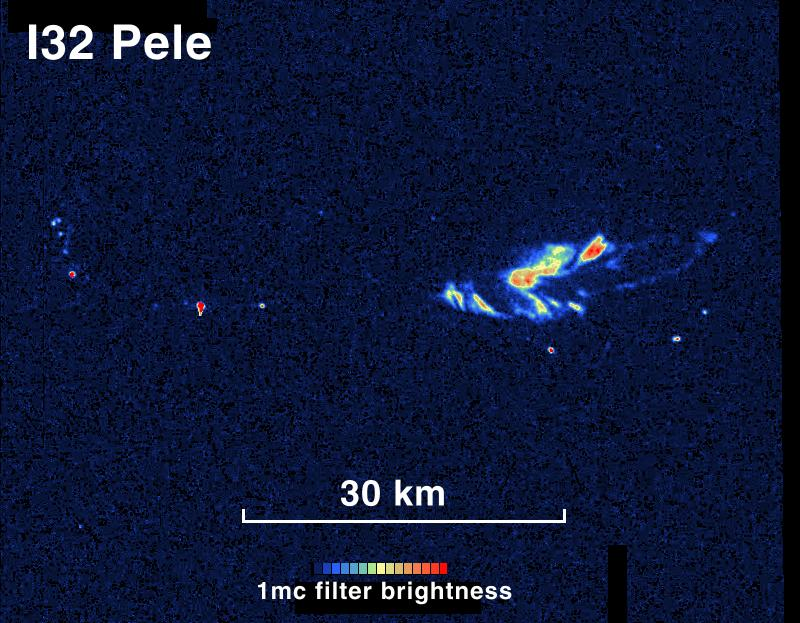
Infrared image showing night-time thermal emission from the lava lake Pele

Following the February 2000 encounter, Galileo's mission at Jupiter was extended for a second and final time with the Galileo Millennium Mission. The focus of this extended mission was joint observation of the Jovian system by both Galileo and Cassini, which performed a distant flyby of Jupiter en route to Saturn on December 30, 2000. Discoveries during the joint observations of Io revealed a new plume at Tvashtar and provided insights into Io's aurorae. Distant imaging by Galileo during the Cassini flyby revealed a new red ring plume deposit, similar to the one surrounding Pele, around Tvashtar, one of the first of this type seen in Io's polar regions, though Galileo would later observe a similar deposit around Dazhbog Patera in August 2001. Galileo performed three additional flybys of Io, on August 6 and October 16, 2001 and January 17, 2002, during the Galileo Millennium Mission. Both encounters in 2001 allowed Galileo to observe Io's polar regions up-close, though imaging from the August 2001 flyby was lost due to a camera malfunction. The data from the magnetometer confirmed that Io lacked an intrinsic magnetic field, though later analysis of this data in 2009 did reveal evidence for an induced magnetic field generated by the interaction between Jupiter's magnetosphere and a silicate magma ocean in Io's asthenosphere. During the August 2001 flyby, Galileo flew through the outer portions of the newly formed Thor volcanic plume, allowing for the first direct measurement of composition of Io's volcanic material. During the October 2001 encounter, Galileo imaged the new Thor eruption site, a major new lava flow at Gish Bar Patera, and the lava lake at Pele. Due to a safing event prior to the encounter, nearly all of the observations planned for the January 2002 flyby were lost.

In order to prevent potential biological contamination of the possible Europan biosphere, the Galileo mission ended on September 23, 2003 when the spacecraft was intentionally crashed into Jupiter.

== Post-Galileo Era: 2003–2016 ==
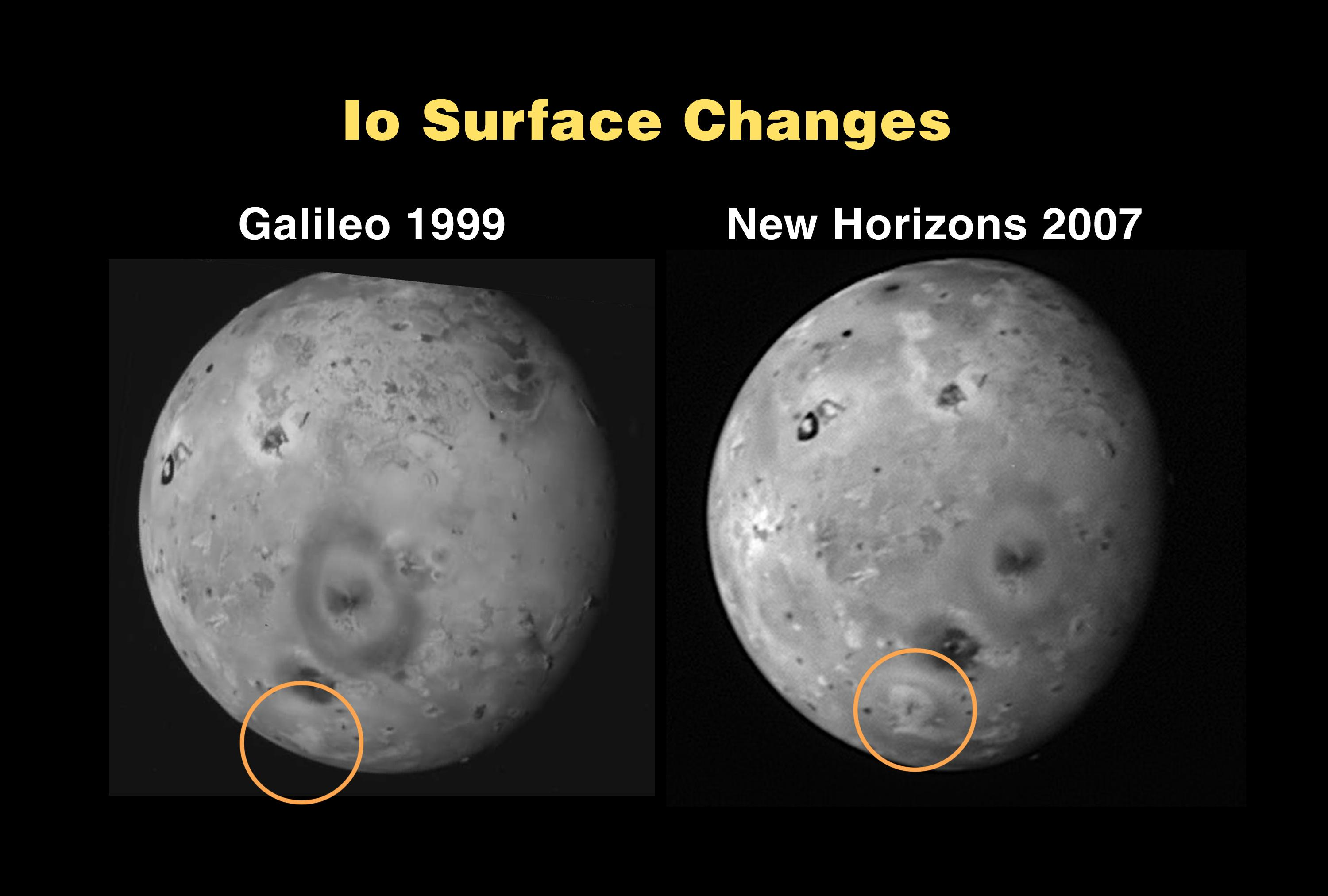
Changes in surface features in the eight years between Galileo and New Horizons observations

Following the end of the Galileo mission, astronomers have continued monitoring Io's active volcanoes with adaptive optics imaging from the Keck telescope in Hawaii and the European Southern Observatory in Chile, as well as imaging from the Hubble telescope. These technologies are used to observe the thermal emissions and measure the composition of gases over volcanoes such as Pele and Tvashtar. Imaging from the Keck telescope in February 2001 revealed the most powerful volcanic eruption observed in modern times, either on Io or on Earth, at the volcano Surt. Earth-based telescopes coming online over the next decade, such as the Thirty Meter Telescope at the Mauna Kea Observatory, will provide more-detailed observations of Io's volcanoes, approaching the resolution achieved by Galileo's near-IR spectrometer. Hubble ultraviolet, millimeter-wave, and ground-based mid-infrared observations of Io's atmosphere have revealed strong density heterogeneities between bright, frost-covered regions along the satellite's equator and its polar regions, providing further evidence that Ionian atmosphere is supported by the sublimation of sulfur dioxide frost on Io's surface.

=== New Horizons (2007) ===
Five-image sequence of New Horizons images showing Io's volcano Tvashtar spewing material 330 km above its surface.

The New Horizons spacecraft, en route to Pluto and the Kuiper belt, flew by the Jupiter system on February 28, 2007, approaching Io to a distance of 2,239,000 km (1,391,000 mi). During the encounter, numerous remote observations of Io were obtained, including visible imaging with a peak resolution of 11.2 km (6.96 mi) per pixel. Like Galileo during its November 1999 flyby of Io and Cassini during encounter in December 2000, New Horizons caught Tvashtar during a major eruption at the same site as the 1999 lava curtain. Owing to Tvashtar's proximity to Io's north pole and its large size, most images of Io from New Horizons showed a large plume over Tvashtar, providing the first detailed observations of the largest class of Ionian volcanic plumes since observations of Pele's plume in 1979. New Horizons also captured images of a volcano near Girru Patera in the early stages of an eruption, and surface changes from several volcanic eruptions that have occurred since Galileo, such as at Shango Patera, Kurdalagon Patera, and Xihe.

A study with the Gemini telescope found that Io's SO_{2} atmosphere collapses during eclipse with Jupiter. Post-eclipse brightening, which has been seen at times in the past, was detected in near infrared wavelengths using an instrument aboard the Cassini spacecraft.

== Juno Era: 2016–2025 ==
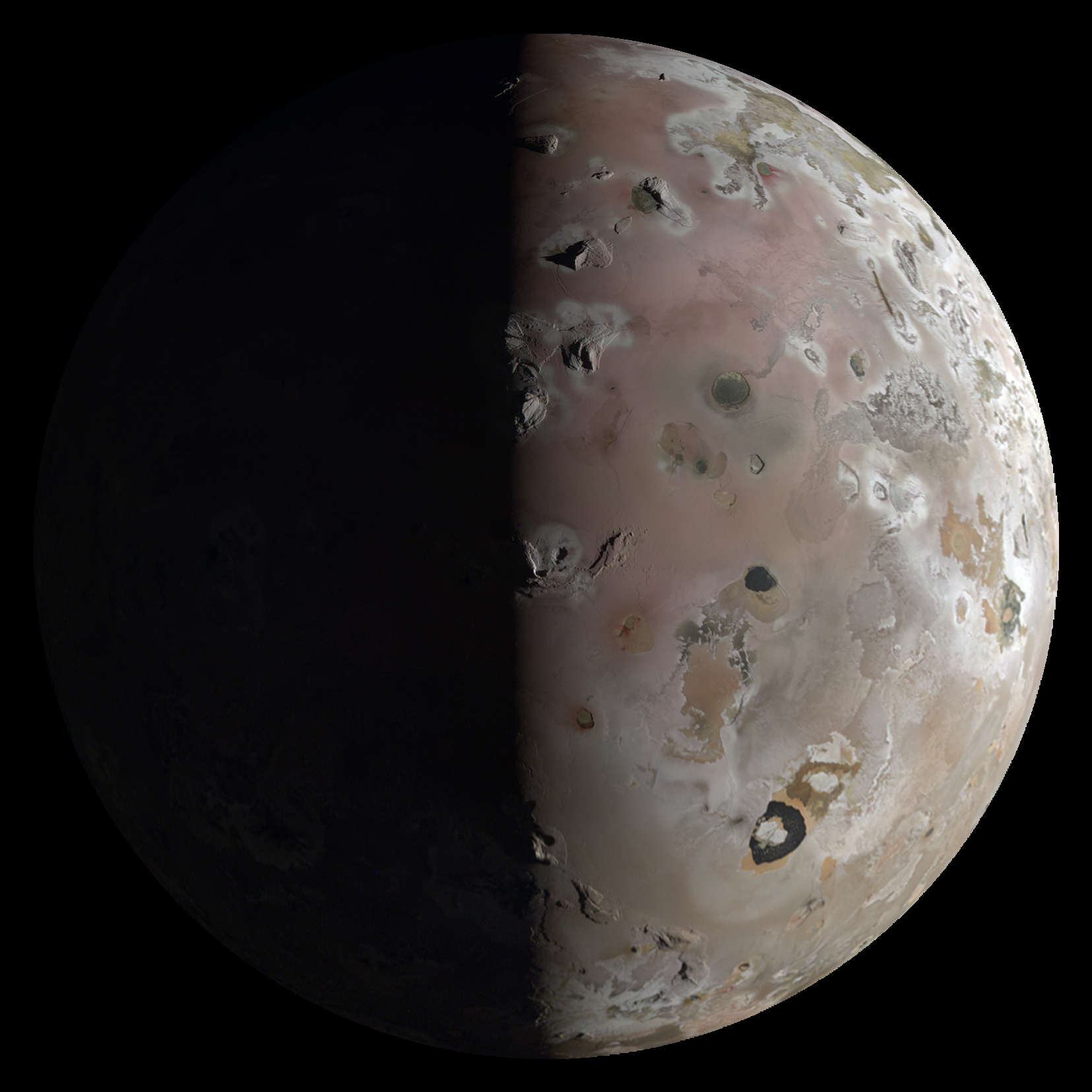
Global image of Jupiter's moon Io acquired by Juno's JunoCam camera on 30 December 2023

The Juno spacecraft was launched in 2011 and entered orbit around Jupiter on July 5, 2016. Juno's mission is primarily focused on improving our understanding of Jupiter's interior, magnetic field, aurorae, and polar atmosphere. Juno's 54-day orbit is highly inclined and highly eccentric in order to better characterize Jupiter's polar regions and to limit its exposure to the planet's harsh inner radiation belts, limiting close encounters with Jupiter's moons. During its primary mission, which lasts through June 2021, Juno's closest approach to Io to date occurred during Perijove 25 on February 17, 2020, at a distance of 195,000 kilometers, acquiring near-infrared spectrometry with JIRAM while Io was in Jupiter's shadow. In January 2021, NASA officially extended the Juno mission through September 2025. While Juno's highly inclined orbit keeps the spacecraft out of the orbital planes of Io and the other major moons of Jupiter, its orbit has been precessing so that its close approach point to Jupiter is at increasing latitudes and the ascending node of its orbit is getting closer to Jupiter with each orbit. This orbital evolution will allow Juno to perform a series of close encounters with the Galilean satellites during the extended mission. Two close encounters with Io occurred during Juno's extended mission on December 30, 2023, and February 3, 2024, both with altitudes of 1,500 kilometers. Nine additional encounters with altitudes between 11,500 and 90,000 kilometers are also planned between July 2022 and May 2025. The primary goal of these encounters will be to improve our understanding of Io's gravity field using doppler tracking and to image Io's surface to look for surface changes since Io was last seen up-close in 2007.

Juno encounters with Io with altitudes less than 100,000 km (62,100 mi)
Orbit	Date	Altitude		Notes
PJ25	February 17, 2020	195,104 km	121,000 mi	Closest encounter to Io during primary mission
PJ43	July 5, 2022	86,141 km	53,500 mi	
PJ47	December 14, 2022	63,771 km	39,600 mi	Safe mode after encounter
PJ49	March 1, 2023	51,547 km	32,000 mi	
PJ51	May 16, 2023	35,555 km	22,100 mi	
PJ53	July 31, 2023	22,202 km	13,800 mi	
PJ55	October 15, 2023	11,640 km	7,230 mi	
PJ57	December 30, 2023	1,500 km	932 mi	
PJ58	February 3, 2024	1,500 km	932 mi	
PJ60	April 9, 2024	17,347 km	10,779 mi	
PJ67	November 25, 2024	85,736 km	53,300 mi	
PJ72	May 8, 2025	92,957 km	57,761 mi	

During several orbits, Juno has observed Io from a distance using JunoCAM, a wide-angle, visible-light camera, to look for volcanic plumes and JIRAM, a near-infrared spectrometer and imager, to monitor thermal emission from Io's volcanoes. JIRAM near-infrared spectroscopy has so far allowed for the coarse mapping of sulfur dioxide frost across Io's surface as well as mapping minor surface components weakly absorbing sunlight at 2.1 and 2.65 μm.

== Future missions ==
Two spacecraft are en route to the Jovian system. The Jupiter Icy Moon Explorer (JUICE) is a European Space Agency mission to the Jovian system that is intended to end up in orbit around Ganymede. JUICE was launched in 2023, with arrival at Jupiter planned for July 2031. JUICE will not fly by Io, but it will use its instruments, such as a narrow-angle camera, to monitor Io's volcanic activity and measure its surface composition during the two-year Jupiter-tour phase of the mission prior to Ganymede orbit insertion.

Europa Clipper is a NASA mission to the Jovian system focused on Jupiter's moon Europa. Like JUICE, Europa Clipper will not perform any flybys of Io, but distant volcano monitoring is likely. Europa Clipper was launched in October 2024 with an expected arrival at Europa in 2030.

A dedicated mission to Io, called the Io Volcano Observer (IVO), was proposed for the Discovery Program as a Jupiter orbiter that would perform at least ten flybys of Io over 3.5 years, but in June 2021 it was passed over in favor of two missions to Venus.

- Exploration of Jupiter
- Volcanology of Io
