= Feuer =

Feuer is the German language word for fire. It may also refer to:

- Feuer (surname)
- "Feuer" (song), the German entry in the Eurovision Song Contest 1978, performed by Ireen Sheer
- "Feuer", a single by the Swiss band Lacrimosa
- "Feuer" (Loredana song), by Swiss-Albanian rapper Loredana

== See also ==
- Feuerland, a 19th-century designation for the industrial nucleus of Berlin
