= FIRE =

FIRE or F.I.R.E. may refer to:

== Concepts ==
- FIRE economy, a segment of the stock market: Finance, Insurance, Real Estate
- FIRE movement, a lifestyle movement: Financial Independence, Retire Early

== Entertainment and arts ==
- FIRE (Maltese band), a rock band founded in 1998
- "F-I-R-E", a 2013 single by the American Christian group Press Play
- F.I.R.E., a 1991 shoot-em-up game developed by the Slovak company Ultrasoft
- F.I.R.E. (Free Inspiring Rising Elements), a Hmong and Lao performance group with May Lee-Yang
- Future in Reverse (FIRE), a performance group founded by composer Huang Ruo

== Organizations ==
- Fellowship of Independent Reformed Evangelicals, a network of Reformed Baptist churches
- Foundation for Individual Rights and Expression (formerly Foundation for Individual Rights in Education), an American civil liberties and free speech organization
- Future Internet Research and Experimentation, a program funded by the European Union
- Future Investors in Real Estate (F.I.R.E.), a student organization at Suffolk College of Arts and Sciences in Boston, Massachusetts, US

== Technology and medicine ==
- Flyby of Io with Repeat Encounters, a proposed spacecraft mission to Jupiter's moon Io
- Fully Integrated Robotised Engine, a series of engines produced by Fiat
- Febrile infection-related epilepsy syndrome (FIRES), a rare form of epilepsy

== See also ==
- Fire (disambiguation)
