= Fire (surname) =

gin derived from the word fire. The Dictionary of American Family Names states that it may be an Americanisation of the German or Ashkenazi Jewish surname Feuer, which itself has origins as "a stoker in a smithy or public baths, or a nickname for someone with red hair or a fiery temper". Notable people with the name include:

- Alexis Fire (born 1964), American pornographic actress and prostitute
- Andrew Fire (born 1959), American biologist
- Walshy Fire (born 1982), Jamaican-American DJ

== See also ==
- Fire (disambiguation)
- FIRE (disambiguation)
- Firer
- Feuer (surname)
