= Firer =

Firer is a surname. Notable people with the surname include:

- Avraham Elimelech Firer (born 1954), Israeli rabbi
- Ivan Firer (born 1984), Slovenian footballer
- Susan Firer (born 1948), American poet
- Ida Firer, married name of Ida Segal, Soviet army officer

== See also ==
- Fire (surname)
- Firor
