= Io Volcano Observer =

Proposed American mission to explore Jupiter's moon Io

- Mission type: Science
- Operator: NASA / Applied Physics Laboratory / University of Arizona
- Website: https://ivo.lpl.arizona.edu/
- Mission duration: 5-year transit to Jupiter 47-month primary mission at Jupiter

Spacecraft properties
- Manufacturer: Applied Physics Laboratory
- Launch mass: <2000 kg
- Dry mass: <800 kg

Start of mission
- Launch date: January 2029 (proposed)
- Rocket: TBD
- Launch site: Cape Canaveral

Jupiter orbiter
- Orbits: 10

Flyby of Io

The Io Volcano Observer (IVO) was a proposal for a low-cost mission to explore Jupiter's moon Io to understand tidal heating as a fundamental planetary process. The main objectives were to understand:

1. How and where is tidal heat generated inside Io?
2. How is tidal heat transported to the surface?
3. How is Io evolving?

Results from IVO were expected to have direct implications for the thermal history of Europa and Ganymede as well as provide insights into other tidally heated worlds such as Titan and Enceladus. IVO data might also have improved our understanding of magma oceans, and therefore the early evolution of the Earth and Moon.

IVO is similar to the Io Orbiter concept suggested for the New Frontiers Program by the 2013–2022 U. S. National Research Council Planetary Science Decadal Survey. The mission was proposed to NASA's Discovery Program by the University of Arizona and Johns Hopkins University's Applied Physics Laboratory in 2010, 2015, and 2019. It was previously proposed to NASA's Discovery & Scout Mission Capability Expansion (DSMCE) in 2007 and awarded a concept study in 2009.

In 2020, IVO was selected along with three other Discovery proposals for further study, with one or two expected to be selected to fly. The Principal Investigator was Alfred McEwen. IVO and Trident were passed over in the Discovery 15 and 16 selection phase in favor of DAVINCI+ and VERITAS, both missions to Venus.

== Mission profile ==
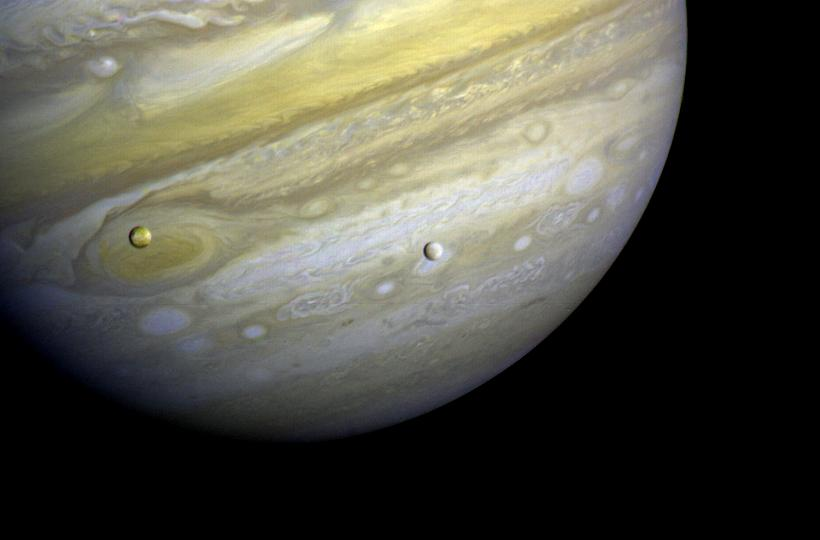
Jupiter, Io, and Europa by Voyager 1

The proposed baseline launch would have allowed a MEGA (Mars-Earth Gravity Assist) trajectory, using a gravity assist at both Mars and Earth to reach Jupiter in August 2033. Following a flyby of Io on its way in, the Io Volcano Observer would have executed a Jupiter orbital insertion burn to go into an inclined orbit around Jupiter. During the remainder of the primary mission, IVO would have encountered Io nine times over four years. During each of these encounters, the spacecraft would have approached Io from over its north polar region, made its closest approach to Io near its equator at an altitude between 200 and 500 kilometers, and left Io over its south polar region. The time and location of closest approach were carefully optimized to obtain the clearest observations of Io's induced magnetic field, libration amplitude, and gravity field. Erupting volcanoes would have been observed in sunlight and in darkness to best constrain the lava compositions. The distribution of heat emanating from would have been measured from polar perspectives that were not seen by the Galileo spacecraft and cannot be observed from Earth. IVO would also have sampled the complex mix of ionized and neutral molecules of plasma and gas around Io. The spacecraft was designed to survive the primary mission with ample margin which could allow various types of extended missions.

=== Current status ===
Io Volcano Observer (IVO) was proposed to the NASA Discovery Program in July 2019 and was selected for further study in February 2020, but in June 2021, two missions to Venus, DAVINCI+ and VERITAS, were selected instead.

== Science ==
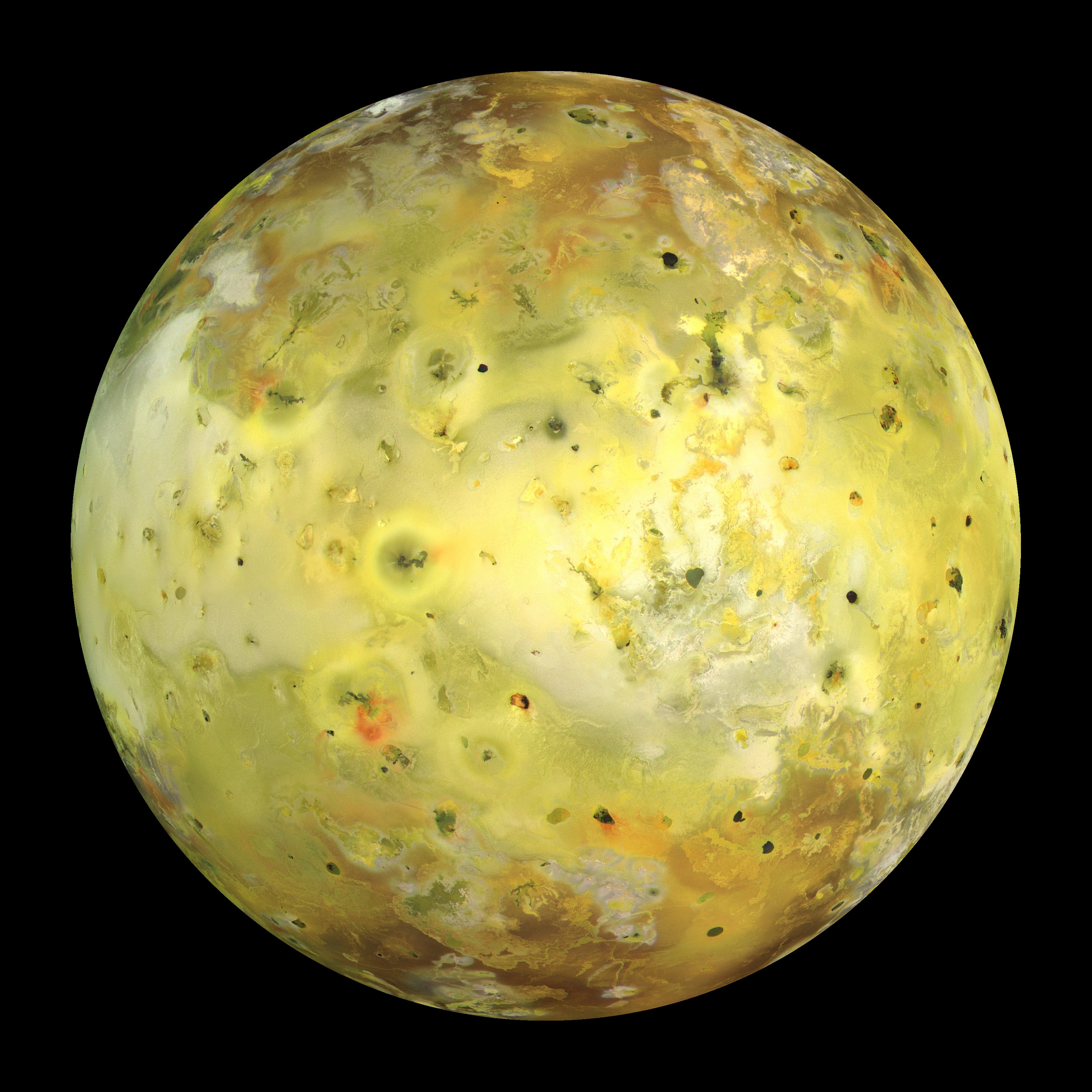
Jupiter's moon Io

The current hyperactive geology of Io is itself of scientific interest, but IVO sought to understand fundamental processes that have implications further than the moon. The slogan describing science to be done at Io was "Follow the Heat."

There is a continuing debate about where the tidal heat is produced within Io with some observations suggesting that it is primarily in the shallow mantle while others suggest that the heating is broadly distributed. It is also unclear how much of the heating is from deforming solid rock versus pushing liquid magma around.

There is evidence suggesting that there is a global layer of melt (sometimes called a magma ocean) under Io's frozen crust but there are also reasons why such a layer of melt cannot persist. IVO would have used four independent experiments to determine if a magma ocean exists and, if it does exist, measure its basic properties. Magma oceans are thought to have been common in the earliest history of most of the bodies in the inner Solar System so IVO might have had the opportunity to investigate a key process that died about 4 billion years ago everywhere else in the Solar System. It is also conceivable that some of the lessons learned about magma oceans may also have been applicable to oceans of water within tidally heated icy moons of the outer Solar System.

For example, the way Io loses its internal heat is very different from how the Earth and other rocky planets lose heat at this time. Io appears to lose almost all its heat via a "heat pipe" process through volcanic eruptions that cover about 1% of the surface of the body. On Earth, plate tectonics mixes large slabs of cold oceanic crust into the warm mantle. On the Moon and Mars, most of the current heat loss is by conduction through the crust. By examining how the cold 99% of Io's crust is involved in the heat pipe tectonics, IVO may have a window into how the early Earth, Moon, and Mars operated.

"Follow the heat" beyond Io bring IVO science to consider the effect tides have on the orbit of Io and the volcanic pollution it spreads across the Jovian system. Io, Europa and Ganymede have their tidal evolution locked to each other via the Laplace resonance, so the system is well-understood only if one combines measurements of all three moons. IVO, as well as the Io exploration spacecraft Europa Clipper and JUICE, would do precisely this. The tons of volcanic gasses stripped from Io every second is spread widely by Jupiter's powerful magnetic field. IVO will fly through this material providing new insight into how this material is removed and where it goes. This is the first step in understanding how the chemistry of Io has been altered from its initial state and may provide useful clues to how atmospheres on other bodies have evolved over time.

Overall, the IVO intended to use Io as a planet-sized natural laboratory to better understand processes that are important across the Solar System and even affect exoplanets.

== Science objectives ==
The science objectives of this proposed mission were:

- Determine the degree and distribution of melt in Io's mantle
- Determine Io's lithospheric structure
- Determine where and how Io is losing heat
- Measure Io's orbital evolution
- Determine the current rate of volatile loss from Io

=== Scientific payload ===
IVO's highly capable science payload was based on instruments developed for other missions.

- Narrow-Angle Camera (NAC): 10 μrad/pixel CMOS detector, pushbroom color imaging in 12 bandpasses from 350–1050 nm, panchromatic framing images for movies and geodesy. Derived from Europa Clipper's EIS NAC camera.
- Thermal Mapper (TMAP): 125 μrad/pixel, nine bandpasses for thermal mapping and silicate compositions. Derived from BepiColombo's MERTIS instrument.
- Dual Fluxgate Magnetometers (DMAG): two units with a sensitivity of 0.01 nT. Related to magnetometers on InSight.
- Planetary Instrument for Magnetic Sounding (PIMS): two 90 degree conical fields of view. Derived from Europa Clipper's PIMS instrument.
- Ion and Neutral Mass Spectrometer (INMS): 1-1000 amu/q mass range. Derived from JUICE's NIM instrument.
- A student-built wide-angle camera (WAC) based on Europa Clipper's EIS WAC camera is also being considered in the Phase A study.

== See also ==
- Flyby of Io with Repeat Encounters (FIRE), a mission concept to Io
- Atmosphere of Io
