= List of extraterrestrial volcanoes =

This is a list of active, dormant, and extinct volcanoes located beyond planet Earth. They may be designated mons (mountain), patera (an irregular crater) or tholus (small mountain or hill) in accordance with the International Astronomical Union's rules for planetary nomenclature. Many of them are nameless.

== Io ==
Animation of eruption from Tvashtar Paterae (Io), taken from imagery from the New Horizons probe in 2007

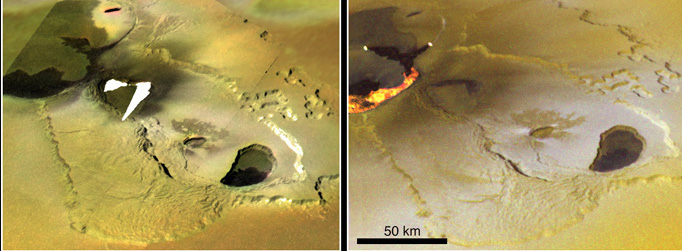
Lava flow at Tvashtar Paterae

Io, a moon of the planet Jupiter, is the most volcanically active body in the Solar System. Its volcanoes are believed to eject sulfur and sulfur dioxide, as well as basaltic and ultramafic silicate lavas.

== Mars ==
Mars has many shield volcanoes, including the largest known volcano of the Solar System, but they are all dormant if not extinct.

The most famous of these volcanoes is Olympus Mons, which is the largest known volcano in the Solar System.

== Venus ==
On Venus, volcanic features are very numerous and quite diverse, but, like on Mars, none are known to be currently active. These volcanoes range from several to several hundred kilometers in diameter; a majority of them are shield volcanoes. In addition, Venus has unusual types of volcanoes: pancake domes and scalloped margin domes. Most small volcanoes on Venus are nameless.

== The Moon ==
Due to the low viscosity of most lunar lava, volcanic mountains were seldom created. Instead, basaltic lava flooded large areas, which became lunar maria. Shield volcanoes are known from a few areas on the Moon; they are called lunar domes. Some areas of the Moon are covered with a usually dark coating, which is interpreted as pyroclastic deposits. Sometimes they form a dark halo around rilles. See also:

- Lunar dome
- Mons Rümker
- Mons Hansteen

== Mercury ==
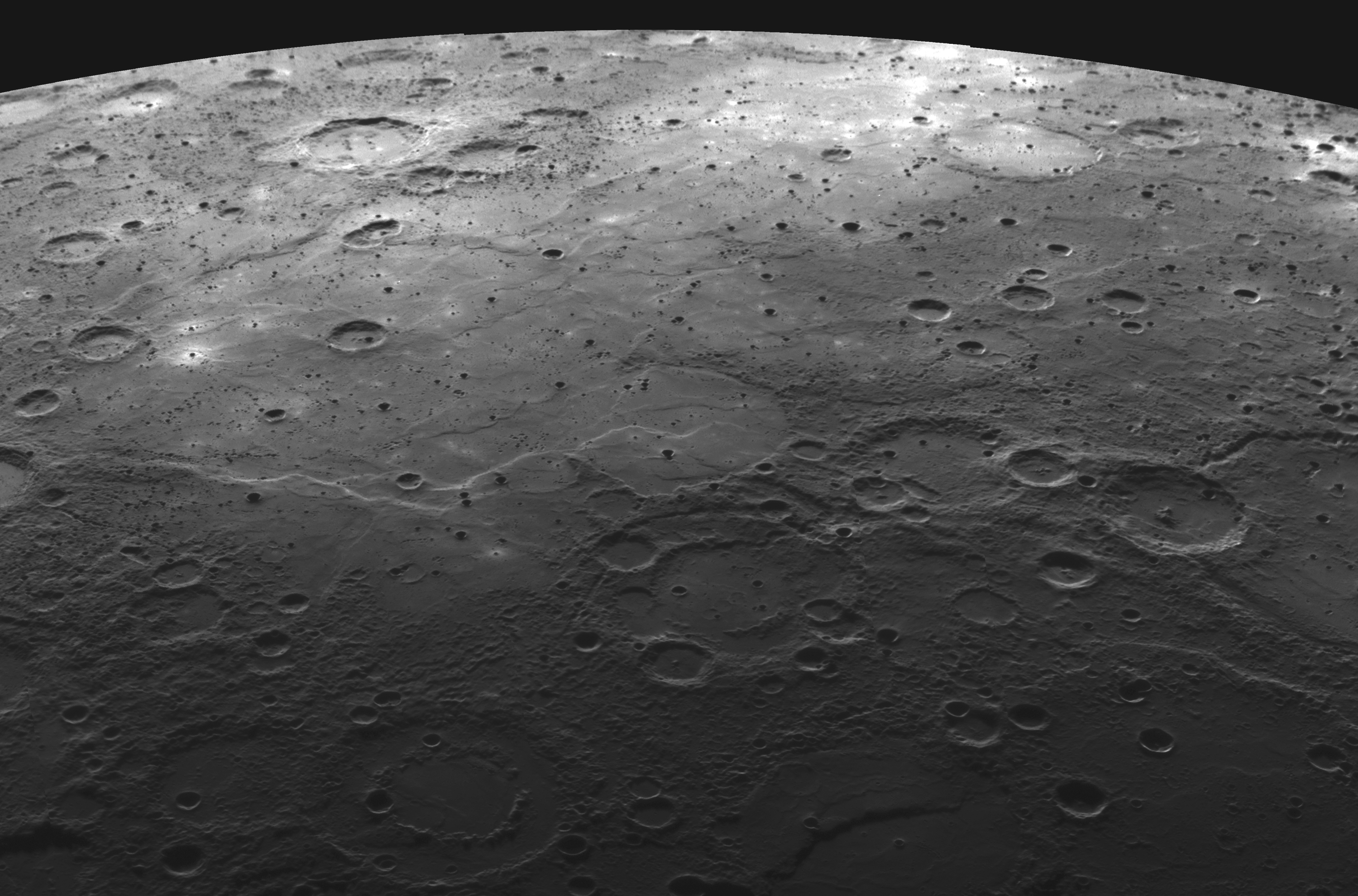
Lava-flooded craters and large expanses of smooth volcanic plains on Mercury

Many of Mercury's basins contain smooth plains, like the lunar mare, that are believed likely to be filled with lava flows. Collapse structures possibly indicative of volcanism have been found in some craters. Eleven volcanic domes were identified in Mariner 10 images, including a 1.4-km high dome near the centre of Odin Planitia.

== Other planets and moons ==
- Saturn's moon Enceladus has fissures that spew water which have been photographed erupting by NASA's Cassini–Huygens spacecraft.
- Reports from NASA's Cassini–Huygens mission indicate that Saturn's moon Titan probably has volcanoes that eject water (cryovolcanoes).
- Triton, a moon of the planet Neptune, has cryovolcanic geysers that are believed to eject nitrogen, dust, or methane compounds, as well as possible cryovolcanic features.
- Pluto has features that may be cryovolcanoes, including Wright Mons and nearby Piccard Mons.

== See also ==
- Cryovolcano
- Category:Extraterrestrial mountains
- Areography
- Lists of volcanoes
