= Vera Salbieva =

Ossetian Red Army officer (1910-1993)

- Salbieva in 1942
- Native name: Вера Ивановна Салбиева
- Born: 27 August 1910; Khumalag, Vladikavkaz okrug, Terek Oblast, Russian Empire
- Died: 27 June 1993 (aged 82) Moscow, Russia
- Allegiance: USSR
- Branch: Red Army / Soviet Army
- Service years: 1931–1947
- Rank: Major
- Conflicts: World War II
- Awards: Order of the Red Banner

Vera Ivanovna Salbieva (Russian: Вера Ивановна Салбиева; 27 August 1910 – 27 June 1993) was an Ossetian Red Army officer. Nominated for the title Hero of the Soviet Union in 1942 by General Mikhail Kozlov for her bravery during a battle against an onslaught of advancing German soldiers in the summer of 1941, she was the first and only Caucasian woman nominated for the title; however, the nomination was downgraded so that she was awarded only an Order of the Red Banner instead.

== Early life ==
Salbieva was born to an Ossetian peasant family in Khumlag, located in what is present-day North Ossetia. After the end of the Russian Civil War she began primary school, and eventually she moved to Tiflis with her older sister Xenia. Initially she worked as a teacher at a boarding school for children before later entering trade school, which taught several supplemental courses beyond basic courses, such as military science, which Salbieva developed an interest in, leading to her decision to enroll as a cadet at the Kiev Military School of Communications named after Kalinin in May 1931. Upon graduation from the school she was sent to Novocherkassk to serve as commander of a communications platoon; she became a member of the Communist Party in 1932. Later she was transferred to the city of Ordzhonikidze; there, she met fellow officer Islam Salamov, who she soon married. Before the war they had three children and moved to Moscow in 1939, where Islam was assigned to a cavalry brigade and Vera to a communications regiment.

== World War II ==
Despite being allowed to forego combat due to motherhood, Salbieva chose to go to the frontlines; two days after the start of the German invasion of the Soviet Union she sent her children to an orphanage to stay at, since her husband was also going to the warfront. On 1 July 1941 she was deployed to the warfront as chief of communications of the 783rd Rifle Regiment with the rank of captain. During the chaotic retreat that ensued throughout autumn that year she distinguished herself in protecting key equipment and securing crucial crossings as they fought their way out of encirclement. On 4 August 1941 when her communications company attempting to retreat across the Dniepr was cut off from the river crossing by German infantry, she raised not only her unit but also nearby Red Army units in attacking the encircling German forces near the river, allowing them to take control of the crossings for use by both infantry as well as military vehicles, including damaged tanks and artillery guns being towed by tractors, saving as much equipment as they could. For her bravery and organization in securing the crossing she was nominated for the title Hero of the Soviet Union, but the nomination was downgraded to an Order of the Red Banner which she was awarded in 1942. Nevertheless, various Soviet newspapers detailed her feat, and she received significant publicity at the time. During the war she was transferred and promoted to various positions, and at one point was head of a communication's unit under Marshal Zhukov. Throughout the war she participated in the battles for Moscow, Belorussia, Ukraine, Poland, and Czechoslovakia.

== Postwar ==
Her husband, had been taken prisoner by the Germans after sustaining a severe head wound that knocked him unconscious, was considered missing during the war. Eventually he was released from the NKVD filtration camp, and Vera retired from the military in 1947, after which they settled in Moscow. Ever since the end of the war Vera had been searching for her children; after several years of searching she finally found them, reuniting in the 1950s; Galina was found in Losinoostrovsky orphanage, while Eduard and Svetlana were found in Perm. With their family reunited and settled in Moscow, Islam worked as head of a print shop while Vera worked in the Moscow Administration of Trade Union Resorts. When asked why she chose to leave her children for the front instead of staying among civilians, she said that neither her oath as a communist nor her military oath would be honored if had forgone fighting. She died on 27 June 1993.

== Awards ==
- Order of the Red Banner
- Order of the Red Star
- Medal "For Battle Merit"
- campaign and jubilee medals

== See also ==
- Ida Segal
- Zinaida Smirnova
