= Zinaida Smirnova =

- Native name: Зинаида Ивановна Смирнова
- Born: 4 October 1923
- Died: 1991 (aged 67–68)
- Allegiance: Soviet Union
- Branch: Red Army
- Service years: 1941–1944
- Rank: Starshina
- Conflicts: World War II
- Awards: Order of Lenin

Zinaida Ivanovna Smirova (Russian: Зинаида Ивановна Смирнова; 1923–1991) was a medic in the Red Army. Badly wounded on multiple occasions while rescuing fellow soldiers during World War II, she was nominated for the title Hero of the Soviet Union, but only awarded the Order of Lenin instead.

== Early life ==
Smirnova was born to a working-class family in Moscow on 4 October 1923; her mother was a nurse, while her father was a worker. In 1937 family moved to Kuibyshev, where she completed her eighth grade of school in 1940; while in school she attended nursing courses.

== World War II ==
Despite being only seventeen years old when Nazi Germany invaded the Soviet Union, she volunteered for the Red Army in July 1941 and was deployed to the warfront near Smolensk as a medic the next month, having attended accelerated training.

In July 1943 her company, subordinate to the 48th Guards Rifle Regiment of the 15th Guards Rifle Division, became encircled by enemy forces in the forest and became completely cutoff from their battalion. After ten hours of fighting in attempt to push away the encirclement, Smirnova volunteered to go by herself to restore contact with their battalion, which she did successfully. For the next several days she helped evacuate 31 soldiers and their weapons from the battlefield under intense fire, and despite being wounded on 13 July she soon left the hospital and returned to the frontlines, and reached a total of 67 people rescued before the end of the month. For her heroism in those days she was awarded the Order of the Red Banner, her first military order. She went on to sustain numerous other injuries while rescuing soldiers, saving 38 people in the Battle of Kharkov. After recovering again she returned to her unit, and saw heavy combat in the fight for a bridgehead on the Dniester. During that battle, she replaced a member of a machine-gun crew who was killed in battle, repulsing a German counterattack and killing twenty enemy combatants. For doing so she was nominated for the title Hero of the Soviet Union on 11 May 1944, but the award proposal was downgraded to the Order of Lenin, which was awarded on 19 September 1944. Nevertheless, she received publicity from Soviet media highlighting her accomplishments and bravery.

Throughout the war she participated in both offensive and defensive operations on the Southern, Stalingrad, 2nd Ukrainian, and 3rd Ukrainian fronts, aiding 680 soldiers before being discharged in October 1944 due to her many injuries. Both her father and stepfather were killed in the war.

== Later life ==
Having been discharged from the military with the rank of starshina due to her extensive injuries, she initially worked as a Komsomol secretary at a textile factory and later as a senior pioneer leader before graduating from law school in Kuibyshev in 1949 and working as an investigator in the local prosecutor's office, where her husband worked as an assistant to the prosecutor. She had two children and received various honors after the war including the Florence Nightingale medal in 1971.

== Awards ==
- Order of Lenin (1944)
- Order of the Red Banner (1943)
- Florence Nightingale Medal (1971)
- Honorary citizen of Bender (1974)
- Campaign and jubilee medals

== See also ==
- Vera Salbieva
- Ida Segal
