= Flyby of Io with Repeat Encounters =

Concept mission to Io

- Names: FIRE
- Mission type: Reconnaissance
- Operator: NASA / JPL
- Mission duration: cruise: 6 years science phase: 4 months (proposed)

Start of mission
- Launch date: 2024 (proposed)
- Rocket: Atlas V
- Launch site: CCAFS, SLC-41
- Contractor: United Launch Alliance

Orbital parameters
- Reference system: Jovicentric

Flyby of Io
- Closest approach: 2030 (proposed)
- Distance: ~100 km (62 mi)
- Orbits: ≥10 flybys
Instruments
- VOLCANO: Visible OpticaL Camera And Near-infrared Observer
- MAGMA: Multi-Axis Geophysical Magnetometer
- CALDERA: Comprehensive AnaLysis of Dust from ERuptions and Atmosphere
- FLARE: FieLd Analysis through Radio Exploration

FIRE (Flyby of Io with Repeat Encounters) is a concept mission to Jupiter's innermost major moon Io. The mission was first presented in 2012, for a possible future consideration by NASA's New Frontiers program.

== Overview ==
If developed in the future, the FIRE spacecraft would use three gravity assists to reach Jupiter six years later. The spacecraft would orbit Jupiter and perform 10 flybys of Io, some as low as 100 km (62 mi) from its surface. The ten flybys would be completed in approximately four months.

As a New Frontiers class mission, the cost cap would be $991 million (FY2012) with a $927 million base cap with a $64 million launch vehicle cost credit.

== Goals and objectives ==
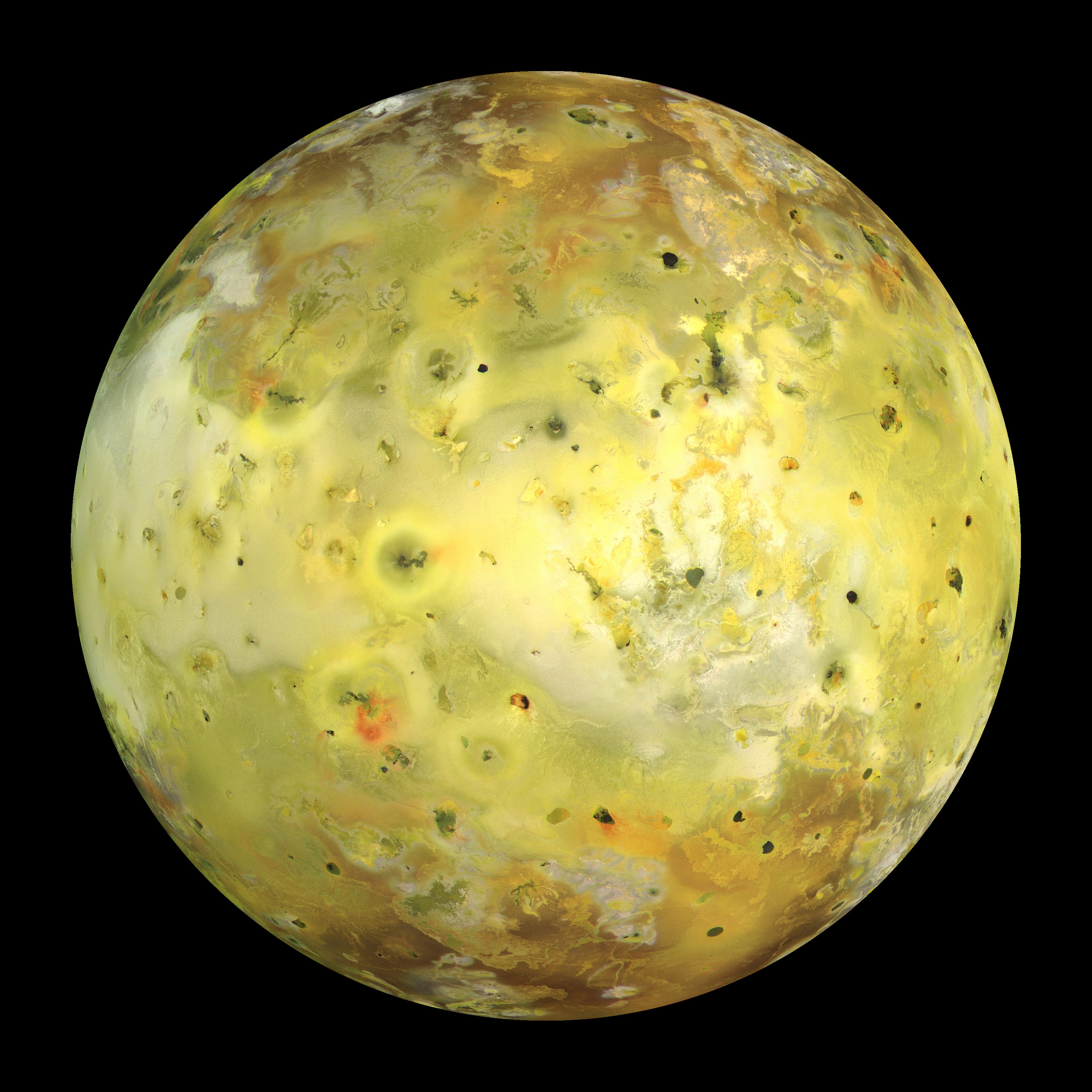
Jupiter's moon Io

== Payload ==
Five-image sequence acquired by New Horizons showing Io's volcano Tvashtar spewing material 330 km above its surface.

The instrument suite includes four proposed instruments:

1. Visible OpticaL Camera And Near-infrared Observer (VOLCANO) is a visible/near-infrared imager.
2. Multi-Axis Geophysical Magnetometer (MAGMA) is a magnetic instrumentation subpackage.
3. Comprehensive AnaLysis of Dust from ERuptions and Atmosphere (CALDERA), is a dust analyzer that would identify the material in the volcanic plumes.
4. FieLd Analysis through Radio Exploration (FLARE) is a radio science experiment.

== Power ==
Electric power to the spacecraft and its scientific payload would be generated by three Advanced Stirling Radioisotope Generators (ASRG). ASRG is a radioisotope power system under development at NASA's Glenn Research Center. It uses a Stirling power conversion technology to convert radioactive-decay heat into electricity for use on spacecraft.

== See also ==
- Atmosphere of Io
- Io Volcano Observer (IVO), a mission concept to Io
- Volcanology of Io
