= Thor (volcano) =

Active volcano on Jupiter's moon Io

Coordinates: 39.15°N 133.14°W

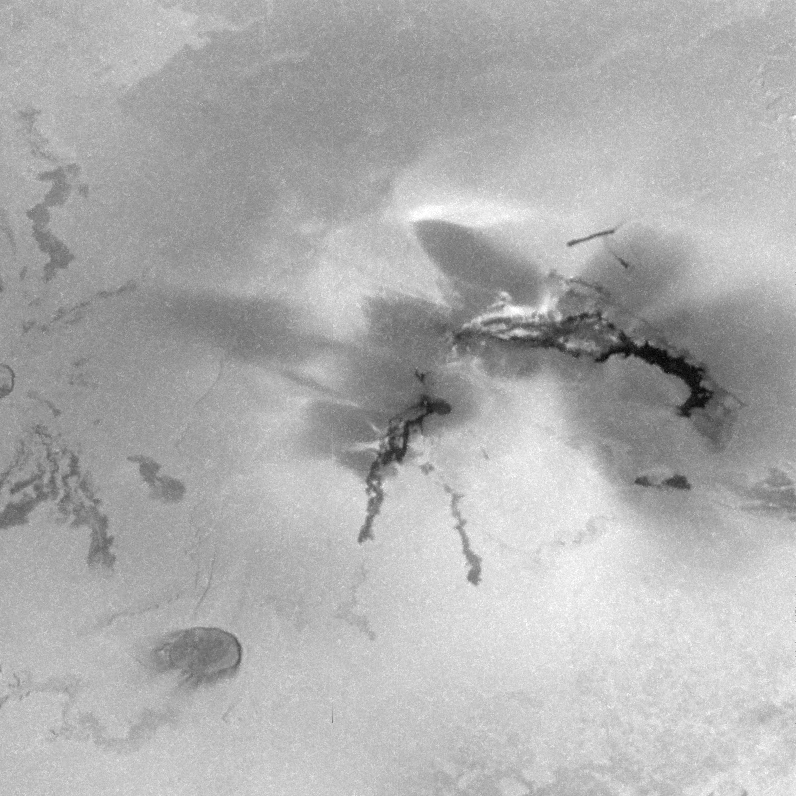
Galileo image of Thor taken in October 2001

Thor is an active volcano on Jupiter's moon Io. It is located on Io's anti-Jupiter hemisphere at . A major eruption with high thermal emission and a large, volcanic plume was observed during a Galileo flyby on August 6, 2001, when the spacecraft flew through the outer portions of the plume allowing for direct sampling. The eruption continued into Galileo's next flyby in October 2001. As seen during high-resolution images taken during the eruption, Thor consists of a series of dark lava flows emanating from a set of nearby volcanic depressions. Before the eruption, the area consisted of red-brown plains, composed of irradiated sulfur, typical of Io's mid- to high-northern latitudes and a set of yellow flows, possibly consisting of sulfur or silicate flows covered by diffuse sulfur deposits. During the New Horizons encounter in February 2007, Thor was still active, with the spacecraft observing thermal emission in the near-infrared and a volcanic plume at the volcano.

Thor was named in 2006 by the International Astronomical Union (IAU) after the Norse god of thunder, Thor.

== 2001 eruption ==
Prior to 2001, no active volcanic activity had been observed at Thor. The appearance of the region had remained stable from Voyager observations of the region in 1979 through the Galileo mission until December 2000 at the latest. In the first detailed observation of Thor, taken in July 1999, several bright, yellow flows were mapped. These flows either consist primarily of sulfur, or are cooled silicate flows coated in sulfur that has condensed on them. Either way, no changes at these flows were observed in their size, color, or distribution through the end of 2000, suggesting that these flows were emplaced before the Voyager encounters. No thermal emission had ever been observed at Thor as late as May 2001, so the eruption observed later that year must have started after those observations.

=== August 2001 ===
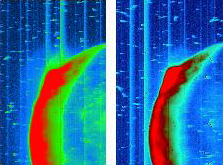
Colorized Galileo image from August 2001 showing the Thor plume

On August 6, 2001, the Galileo spacecraft flew over Io's north polar region at an altitude of 194 kilometers (121 mi). The goal of the flyby was to image the source of the Tvashtar plume at high-resolution and sample the material in the plume directly. Imaging during the encounter was prevented by a camera anomaly. Distant imaging acquired a few days before and after the encounter were successful. Images of a crescent Io were taken on August 4, 2001, to image the Tvashtar plume as context for closer and in situ observations during the encounter. Instead of a plume at Tvashtar, the images revealed a volcanic plume over Thor, suggesting that a major eruption was ongoing. The plume at Thor had two components: an inner dust plume 100–125 km (62–78 mi) tall and a larger, fainter halo 440 km (270 mi) tall. This outer plume is one of the largest observed on Io (only the Grian Patera plume seen in July 1999 was larger). The outer halo was composed of sulfur dioxide gas and fine, SO_{2} dust grains 0.5-10 nanometers in size. While the outer halo was fainter than the inner, optically thick dust plume, the mass of outer halo was actually greater (at least 10^{8} kg compared to 10^{6}-10^{7} kg for the typical dust plume).

During the encounter, while the camera was not functioning properly, the other scientific instruments on Galileo were able to obtain observations of the Thor eruption. During closest approach, the Plasma Subsystem, an instrument designed to detect plasma in the vicinity of the spacecraft, sampled some of the material in the outer halo of the Thor plume, finding "snowflakes" weighing 500-1000 amu. Assuming a pure sulfur dioxide composition, this suggested that the dust particles inferred by the camera's distant observation were made up of 15 to 20 molecules of sulfur dioxide. The Near-infrared Mapping Spectrometer (NIMS) mapped thermal emission and infrared spectra across Io's anti-Jupiter hemisphere shortly after the encounter, and found an intense thermal hotspot at Thor with a near-infrared spectrum consistent with an explosion-dominated eruption. NIMS found high eruption temperatures at Thor suggesting exposed, silicate lava and a high power output indicating a high flow rate for the lava at Thor. Prior to its official naming by the IAU, NIMS scientists designated the eruption I31A, as the first new eruption detected during Galileo orbit I31.

Another imaging observation taken on August 8 showed the effects of this eruption on the surface of Io, as a new dark spot was observed surrounding the Thor volcano and a bright ring composed of fresh, fine-grained sulfur dioxide frost deposited by the plume. In some areas of the white plume deposit, the areal coverage of SO_{2} frost had increased from 60 to 70% to 100% as a result of this eruption. The size of the plume deposit is consistent with being formed by Thor's inner dust plume. NIMS data suggests that the outer plume may form a deposit of very fine-grained SO_{2} that is transparent at visible wavelengths, while the inner plume deposit is thicker and contains larger frost grains, which would appear bright at visible wavelengths. Unlike many large, "outburst" eruptions, no red deposits were observed at Thor, suggesting that the upper lithosphere of Io contains heterogeneities in the distribution of sub-surface sulfur.

=== October 2001 ===
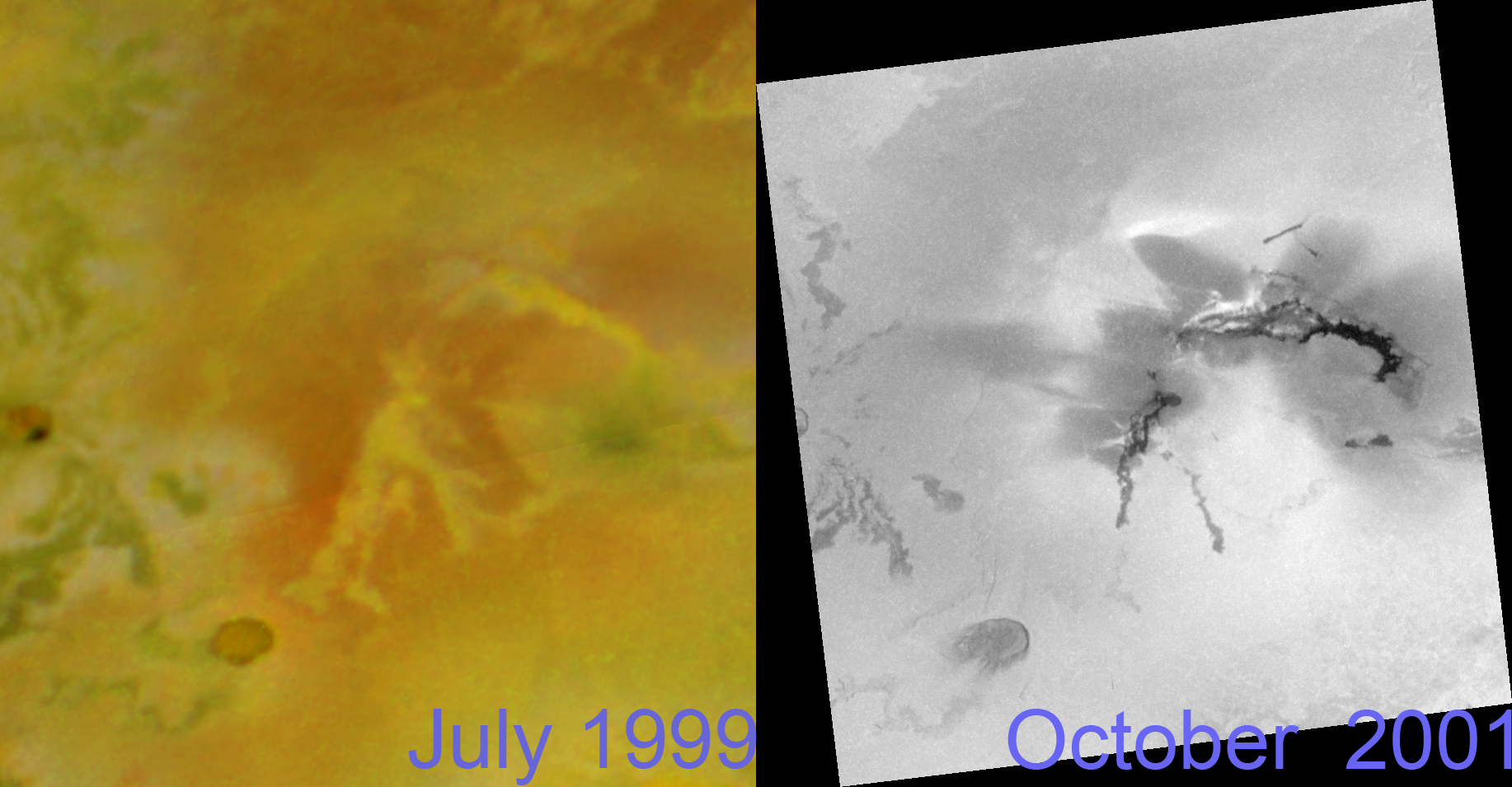
Surface changes at Thor between July 1999 and October 2001

Galileo flew by Io again on October 16, 2001, this time passing over the satellite's south polar region at an altitude of 184 km (114 mi). As a result of the discovery of the Thor eruption during the previous flyby, the observation plan was adjusted so that the camera and near-infrared spectrometer could take high-resolution images and spectra of the new eruption site. The camera acquired a single, clear-filter frame over the volcano with a spatial resolution of 334 meters (1,100 ft) per pixel. The image revealed several new dark, silicate lava flows, many surrounded by dark, pyroclastic flow deposits. The dark flows generally covered over the previously observed yellow flows, though by October 2001, some of those older flows remained visible. The source of a large dark flow on the eastern side of the volcano appears to be a fissure 50 by 17 km (31 by 11 mi) in size. This fissure maybe a patera, or volcanic depression, in the process of forming. Distant color imaging taken a few hours after the flyby showed that the volcanic plume at Thor was still visible.

NIMS also observed Thor at high resolution. It found Thor was still vigorously erupting, though the power output was lower than it was in August 2001. The most intense part of the eruption (in terms of total power output) was centered over the large eastern lava flow observed by the camera team. NIMS also found thermal emission from several nearby paterae, where no volcanic activity had previously been observed. This activity coincided with a darkening of the floors of these volcanoes, as a result of fresh lava flows or the sublimation of sulfur deposits seen by the camera on Galileo. Activity at nearby volcanoes suggested that the magma plumbing system below Thor extended to these features as well, producing renewed volcanic activity on a regional scale.

== After Galileo ==
While the Galileo observations of Thor in October 2001 were the last for the spacecraft, the 2001 eruption continued to be observed by Earth-based astronomers. Thermal emission from Thor was seen from the Keck telescope in Hawaii on December 22, 2001. Volcanic activity continued even into the New Horizons encounter in February 2007, when a thermal hotspot and a faint volcanic plume 100 km (62 mi) tall were spotted at Thor. However, the plume and much of the dark pyroclastic flow deposits had faded or were covered by a new plume at Tvashtar by that time.

== Gallery ==
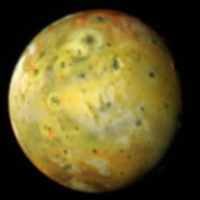
Low-resolution images of the anti-Jupiter hemisphere of Io, showing the effects of the Thor eruption in August 2001

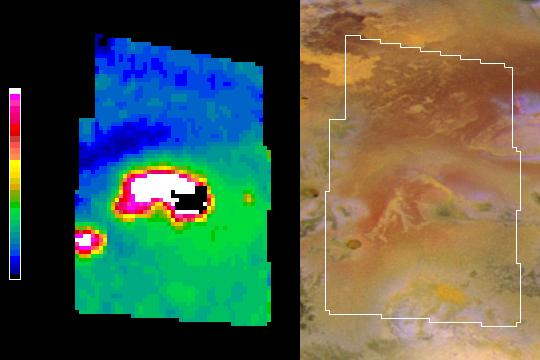
Near-infrared thermal emission from Thor in October 2001
