= Firor =

Firor is a surname. Notable people with the surname include:

- Anne Firor Scott (1921–2019), American historian
- John W. Firor (1927–2007), American physicist
- Matt Firor, founder of ZeniMax Online Studios, American video game developer

== See also ==
- Firer
