= Feuer (surname) =

Feuer is a German and Jewish surname of multiple possible origins. Notable people with the surname include:

- Cy Feuer (1911–2006), American theatre producer, director, composer, and musician
- Debra Feuer (born 1959), American actress
- Donya Feuer (1934–2011), American dancer, choreographer, theater director and filmmaker
- Eduard Feuer (born 1936), mechanical engineer and entrepreneur
- Ian Feuer (born 1971), American former professional soccer player
- Jane Feuer (fl. 1980s–2010s), American professor of film studies
- Lewis Samuel Feuer (1912–2002), American sociologist
- Mike Feuer (born 1958), American politician and lawyer
- Zach Feuer (fl. 2000s–2010s), founding member of the Zach Feuer Gallery

== See also ==
- Fire (surname)
