= Ida Segal =

Soviet army officer (1923–2017)

- Ида Нухимовна Сегал
- Segal in 1944
- Born: 9 January 1923; Fastiv, Kiev oblast, Ukrainian SSR, USSR
- Died: 27 February 2017 (aged 94); Los Angeles county, California, United States
- Military career
- Allegiance: Soviet Union
- Branch: Red Army
- Service years: 1941–1945
- Rank: Senior Lieutenant
- Awards: Order of the Red Banner

Ida Nukhimovna Firer née Segal (Russian: Ида Нухимовна Сегал; 9 January 1923 – 27 February 2017) was an assistant political commissar in the Red Army who functioned as a paratrooper and medic during World War II. In 1943 for her bravery during the Dnieper crossing she was nominated for the title Hero of the Soviet Union, but received only the Order of the Red Banner.

== Early life ==
Segal was born on 9 January 1923 to a Jewish family in Fastov; their family moved to Kiev in 1930, where she went on to join the Komsomol in 1938 and graduate from high school in 1940 before starting university with a major in geography in 1941, but her dreams of becoming a pilot never came to fruition.

== World War II ==
Immediately after the German invasion of the Soviet Union she volunteered for the Red Army; initially after applying to join with her classmates they were rejected and told to help by digging trenches instead, but soon she was accepted in the military and made assigned to a sapper battalion, where she became an assistant political commissar. During the mass retreat in late 1941 she was assigned to sit in on interrogations of Soviet soldiers who escaped from encirclements. In November 1941 she became a paratrooper in the 204th Airborne Brigade of the 1st Airborne Corps, retaining her position as a deputy political educator. Despite not having made any practice jumps, she had to jump out of a DB-3 to land behind enemy lines with a group of experienced paratroopers. Having managed to figure out how to work her parachute in a short timeframe, she managed to land safely and report to command. In addition to her six parachute jumps, she also participated in a mission to attack German forces from the rear on skis near Demyansk; the mission had intended to use parachutes, but poor weather led to her unit being deployed via the use of skis instead. During the ensuing battle she was wounded and had to be taken to a field hospital. Upon recovery she joined the 37th Guards Rifle Division (which had previously been the 1st Airborne Corps) as an assistant commissar in a medical company, where she was tasked with evacuating the wounded during the Battle of Stalingrad under heavy enemy fire. For her bravery in saving the wounded during that battle she was awarded the Order of the Red Star in April 1943. Later that year on the night of 15–16 October she led an assault boat of her battalion during the Dnieper crossing, which was the first of the assault groups in the 149th Rifle Division to cross over to the right bank of the river and establish a bridgehead. The battalion sustained heavy casualties in the ensuing battle, but her boat survived, allowing her to lead them pushing deep into the right bank to establish a strong foothold to maintain until reinforcements arrived. For her actions in that battle she was praised in various Soviet publications and nominated for the title Hero of the Soviet Union, but the award nomination was downgraded to an Order of the Red Banner. Shortly thereafter Segal was transferred to a communications regiment, where she remained until the end of the war, experiencing victory day while stationed in Poland.

== Postwar ==
After the end of the war in 1945 she retired from the military and married fellow Red Army officer Aleksandr Firer. They settled in the city of Odessa, where she worked as a secretary, librarian, and pharmacist before becoming pensioner in 1984. Having been widowed in 1986, she immigrated to the United States after the fall of the Soviet Union, where she lived for the remainder of her life. In 2009 she became one of the veterans interviewed by Blavatnik film archive. She died in Los Angeles on 27 February 2017.

== Awards ==
- Order of the Red Banner (1943)
- Order of the Patriotic War 1st class (1985)
- Order of the Red Star (1943)
- campaign and jubilee medals

== See also ==
- Vera Salbieva
- Zinaida Smirnova
