= FIRE (Maltese band) =

Rock band from Malta

- Origin: Malta
- Genres: Hard rock, heavy metal, blues rock
- Years active: 1998—present
- Members: Kenneth Calleja; Joe Vella; Robert Longo; Trevor Catania; Robert Spiteri
- Past members: Mark Abela; Charles Cassar; Laurence Baldacchino; Ruben Micallef
- Website: Firemalta.com

FIRE is a rock band from Malta. Founded in 1998, the band's line-up includes vocalist Kenneth Calleja, guitarists Joe Vella and Robert Longo, bassist Trevor Catania and drummer Robert Spiteri. The band has released three albums, which have received favorable reviews.

Beyond their presence in the Maltese music scene, FIRE has also gained attention on an international level, performing at various music festivals and events outside of Malta.

== Band members ==
Current

- Kenneth Calleja - lead vocals
- Joseph (Pejxa) Vella - guitar
- Robert Longo - guitar
- Trevor Catania - bass guitar
- Robert Spiteri - drums

Former

- Mark Abela - drums
- Charles Cassar - bass guitar
- Laurence Baldacchino - drums
- Ruben Micallef - bass guitar

== Discography ==
=== Studio albums ===
- Flight to Cuba/Soul on Ice (2005)
- Ignite (2006)
- Thrill Me (2009)

=== Singles ===
- "Miss You This Christmas" (2007)
