= Tvashtar Paterae =

Active volcanic region on the moon Io

Coordinates: 62.76°N 123.53°W

Animation of eruption from Tvashtar Paterae, taken from imagery from the New Horizons probe in 2007

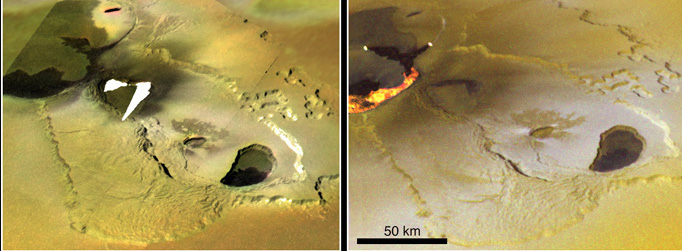
Two images taken by Galileo over the course of three months showing the shifting regions of lava flow. The Galileo probe observed a lava curtain erupting from the small patera in the centre of the image, and the lava lake from the larger one above it.

Tvashtar Paterae compose an active volcanic region of Jupiter's moon Io located near its north pole. It is a series of paterae, or volcanic craters. It is named after Tvashtar, the Hindu god of blacksmiths. Tvashtar was discovered in IRTF images on 26 November 1999, several hours after a Galileo flyby. Images taken with the ESO 3.6m telescope and its adaptive optics in September 1999 revealed the presence of faint hot spot (labeled 990930D). The outburst was studied by the Galileo spacecraft over several years. During this time, a 25-kilometre (16 mi) long, 1-to-2-kilometre (0.62 to 1.24 mi) high curtain of lava was seen to erupt from one patera, a lake of superheated silicate lava erupted in the largest patera, and finally a plume of gas burst out, rising 385 kilometres (239 mi) above Io and blanketing areas as far away as 700 kilometres (430 mi).

The hot spot awakening of Tvashtar was observed on 2 June 2006 with the Keck Adaptive Optics system and followed up for 530 days making it the longest outburst eruption ever observed on Io. On February 26, 2007, the eruption was photographed by the New Horizons probe as it went past Jupiter en route to Pluto. The probe observed an enormous 330-kilometre (210 mi) high plume from the volcano, with an as-yet unexplained filamentary structure made clearly visible by the background light from the sun.

== See also ==
- List of extraterrestrial volcanoes
- Tvashtar
