= Atmosphere of Io =

Thin layer of gases surrounding Jupiter's moon Io

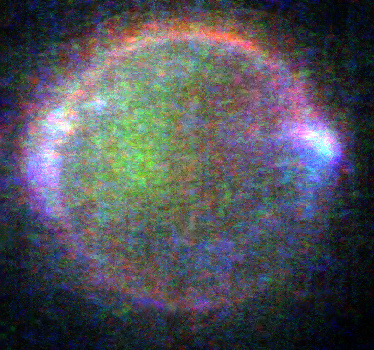
Auroral glows in Io's upper atmosphere. Different colors represent emission from different components of the atmosphere (green comes from emitting sodium, red from emitting oxygen, and blue from emitting volcanic gases like sulfur dioxide). Image taken by Galileo while Io was in eclipse.

The atmosphere of Io is the extremely thin blanket of gases surrounding Jupiter's third largest moon Io. The atmosphere is primarily composed of sulfur dioxide (SO_{2}), along with sulfur monoxide (SO), sodium chloride (NaCl), and monoatomic sulfur and oxygen. Dioxygen is also expected to be present.

== Origin ==
Io is considered to be the most volcanically active body in the Solar System. Pele type volcanism is believed to be the cause of sulfur components in the atmosphere. Volcanic plumes pump 10^{4} kg of SO_{2} (sulfur dioxide) per second into Io's atmosphere on average, though most of this is deposited back onto the surface. Sunlight sublimates this solid SO_{2}, turning it into the gaseous state and creating a thin atmosphere. Due to this, atmospheric pressure is significantly higher near volcanoes, about 0.5 to 4 mPa (5 to 40 nbar), around 5,000 to 40,000 times larger than that of the night side of Io.

Apart from this, minor components like NaCl, SO, O are also formed by other processes. The main source of NaCl and KCl is thought to be volcanic. Some volcanic vents are thought to expel NaCl and KCl but little to no SO_{2}. Sputtering of the surface by charged particles from Jupiter's magnetosphere is thought to be the origin of the NaCl, SO, O, and S. They are also formed from direct volcanic outgassing.

Photodissociation is thought to be the origin of SO, Na, K, and Cl. Photodissociation plays an important role in the atmosphere at higher latitudes. Because the process happens more often during daytime, the concentration of Na is believed to be higher during daytime.

== Physical characteristics ==
SO_{2} is the main constituent, comprising 90% of the atmospheric pressure. About 3%–10% is SO. The atmospheric pressure varies from 0.033 to 0.3 mPa or 0.33 to 3 nbar, seen on Io's anti-Jupiter hemisphere and along the equator, and temporally in the early afternoon when the temperature of surface frost peaks. On the night side, SO_{2} freezes, decreasing the atmospheric pressure to 0.1 × 10^{−7} to 1 × 10^{−7} Pa (0.0001 to 0.001 nbar). Some studies suggest that the night side atmosphere consists of non-condensable gases like atomic O and SO. The atmosphere on the side facing away from Jupiter is not just denser but also extends over a greater range of latitudes than the side facing Jupiter. The vertical column density at the equator ranges from 1.5 × 10^{16} cm^{−2} at sub-Jovian longitudes to 15 × 10^{16} cm^{−2}at anti-Jovian longitudes.

On the surface, sulfur dioxide is in vapor pressure equilibrium with frost. The temperatures increases to 1,800 K at higher altitudes where the lower atmospheric density permits heating from plasma in the Io plasma torus and from Joule heating from the Io flux tube. The day-side atmosphere is mostly confined to within 40° of the equator, where the surface is warmest and most active volcanic plumes are found. The polar atmospheric pressure is only 2% of the equatorial atmospheric pressure. At about ±40° latitude, the atmospheric pressure will be half of that at the equator. The atmospheric density increases the closer Io gets to the Sun.

Farther away from the surface, higher the concentration of O and S_{2} gets. This is because of the lower mass of oxygen and sulphur atoms compared to others. The O/SO_{2} ratio is estimated to be between 10% and 20% in the upper atmosphere. These gases exist up to a distance of 10 times the radius of Io.

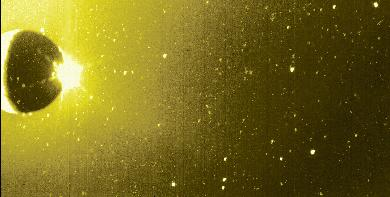
Image of Io in false colour. Most of Io's surface is visible. The dark part is lit by reflected light from Jupiter (Jupitershine). The burst of white light near Io's eastern equatorial edge is sunlight being scattered by the plume of the volcano Prometheus. Its plume extends about 100 kilometers above the surface. Much of the yellow color in the background comes from Io's sodium cloud: sodium atoms within Io's extensive material halo are scattering sunlight at the yellow wavelength of about 589 nanometers.

Io has a sodium tail similar to the sodium tail of the Moon. Io also has an ionosphere with a density of 2.8 × 10^{10} m^{−3} at 80 km altitude, comparable to the ionospheres of Mars and Venus. Occultation studies by Pioneer 10 revealed that the night-side ionosphere is significantly less dense for the first time. Based on the six occultations conducted by the Galileo probe in 1997, the ionosphere is asymmetrical: the plasma density varies by longitude. The interpretation of the observations assumes that the increased plasma density is distributed in a spherically symmetrical bound ionosphere with a dense downstream wake. Depending on the location, peak densities of about 5 × 10^{10} m^{−3} were found, reaching a maximum of about 2.5 × 10^{11} m^{−3} in one of the occultations.

Due to its thinness, Io's atmosphere does not cause that much effect on the surface, other than moving SO_{2} ice around and expanding the size of plume deposit rings when plume material re-enters the denser dayside atmosphere. Every second, almost one tonne of gases escape from Io's atmosphere into outer space due to Jupiter's magnetosphere. Due to this, the atmosphere should be constantly replenished. These gases orbit Jupiter along with Io, creating a Io plasma torus.

=== Post-ecliptic brightening ===
Io's atmospheric density is directly related to surface temperature. When Io falls into the shadow of Jupiter during an eclipse, the temperature falls. This causes deposition of the SO_{2}, and results in an 80% decrease in the atmospheric pressure. This increases the albedo of Io; thus Io appears brighter when covered with frost immediately after an eclipse. After about 15 minutes the brightness returns to normal, presumably because the frost has disappeared through sublimation. Post-ecliptic brightening can be observed with ground telescopes. Cassini spacecraft captured post-eclipse brightening in near-infrared wavelengths. Further evidence for this theory came in 2013 when the Gemini Observatory was used to directly measure the collapse of Io's SO_{2} atmosphere during, and its reformation after, eclipse by Jupiter.

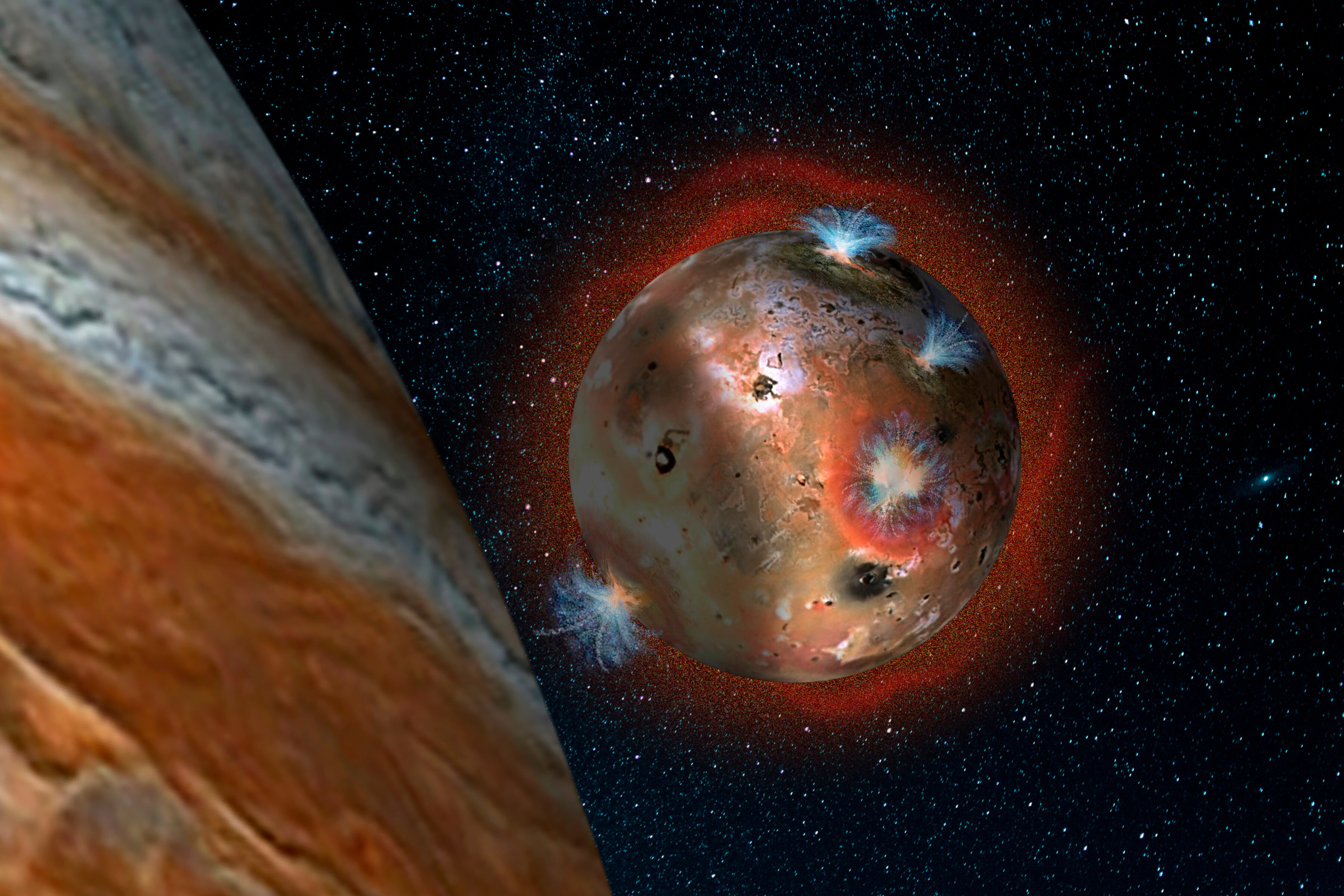
Deflation of the atmosphere of Io as it enters Jupiter's shadow, as visualized by the artist.

== Aurora ==
Io hosts aurora events, even though the atmosphere is extremely thin. Unlike other celestial bodies where an aurora occurs at the North and South poles, aurora on Io occurs near the equator. This is because aurorae on other bodies are caused by the interactions of the body's magnetosphere with the solar wind. In contrast, Io has no magnetic field of its own. Instead of solar wind, charged particles from Jupiter's magnetosphere interact with Io's atmosphere, creating aurora.

Aurora near the equator of Io. Red glows are due to oxygen, and blue are from SO_{2}. White dots are volcanoes.

Sodium atoms cause a green glow in the aurora. Here blue glows caused by SO_{2} are nearer to the surface than red glows caused by oxygen. This is because SO_{2} is heavier than oxygen, and as a result will be more gravitationally bound to the surface. Due to this, red glows reach up to a height of 900 km (560 miles). The aurora moves across Io, as it changes its orientation with respect to Jupiter's magnetosphere as it orbits the planet.
