= Tidal heating of Io =

Dissipation of orbital and rotational friction between Jupiter and Io

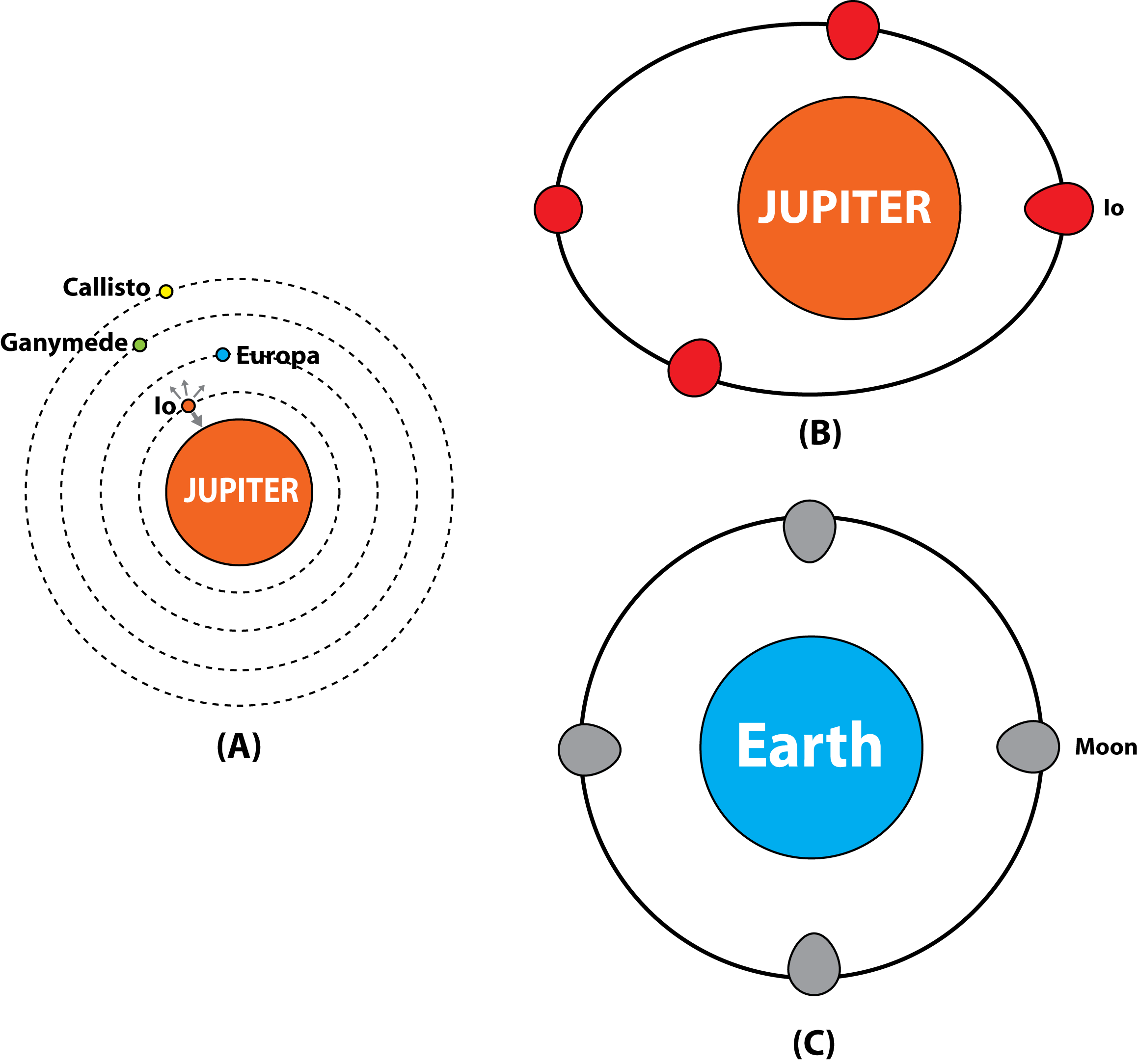
Tidal heating on Io. (A) Of the four major moons of Jupiter, Io is the inner-most one. Gravity from these bodies pull Io in varying directions. (B) Io's eccentric orbit. Io's shape changes as it completes its orbit. (C) Earth’s moon’s orbit is nearly circular so its deformation does not change.

Tidal heating, or tidal working, occurs on the Galilean moon Io due to frictional processes caused by Jupiter’s gravitational pull. As Io orbits, the immense gravity of Jupiter exerts a stronger force on the side closest to the planet than on the opposite side, distorting Io’s shape.

In addition, Io is in an orbital resonance with Europa and Ganymede, two of Jupiter’s other large moons. This interaction keeps Io’s orbit slightly elliptical, causing its distance from Jupiter to vary. As a result, the degree of gravitational distortion changes over time, flexing Io’s interior and generating heat through friction. This process drives Io’s intense volcanic activity, making it the most geologically active body in the Solar System.

Although there is general agreement that the cause of the heat and volcanoes as manifested in Io's many volcanoes is tidal heating from the pull of gravity from Jupiter and its moon Europa, the volcanoes are not in the positions predicted with tidal heating. They are shifted 30 to 60 degrees to the East. A study published by The Astrophysical Journal in 2015 explains the eastern shift by an ocean of molten rock under the surface. The movement of this magma would generate extra heat. Liquids, especially if they are sticky (or viscous), can produce heat through friction. The team who wrote the paper believe that the subsurface ocean is a mixture of molten and solid rock. When the molten rock flows, it may swirl and rub against the surrounding rock, thus generating heat.

Other moons in the Solar System undergo tidal heating, and they too may have more heat generated by this process, including heat from the movement of water. This ability to generate heat in a subsurface ocean increases the chance of life on bodies like Europa and Enceladus.
