= Chaac-Camaxtli region =

Volcanic region on Jupiter's moon Io

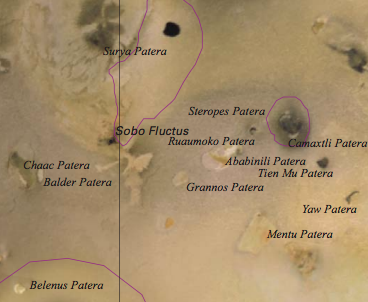
The Chaac-Camaxtli region of Io

The Chaac-Camaxtli region is a volcanic region on Jupiter's moon Io, located from approximately 5 to 20°N and 130 to 160°W in its anti-Jovian hemisphere. It consists mainly of the hummocky bright plains that occupy the surface. This area is defined on the west by Chaac Patera, and on the east by Camaxtli Patera. At least 10 distinct volcanic centers are located in the region, making it a volcanically active region on Io's surface. Most of the volcanism here is expressed as paterae, which range in size from circular to elliptical. A patera is defined by the International Astronomical Union as "irregular or complex craters with scalloped edges." The largest volcanic structure here is the Chaac Patera (105 km X 48 km). The paterae found in the Chaac-Camaxtli region are Chaac, Balder Patera, Grannos, Ababinili, Ruaumoko, Steropes, Camaxtli, Tien Mu, Utu, and Mentu.

This region is full of features that provide clues to the volcanism, tectonism, and magmatic processes on Io. Similar concepts happening on Io have been thought to have occurred in Earth's past, and some terrestrial analogues occur today.

== Observations ==
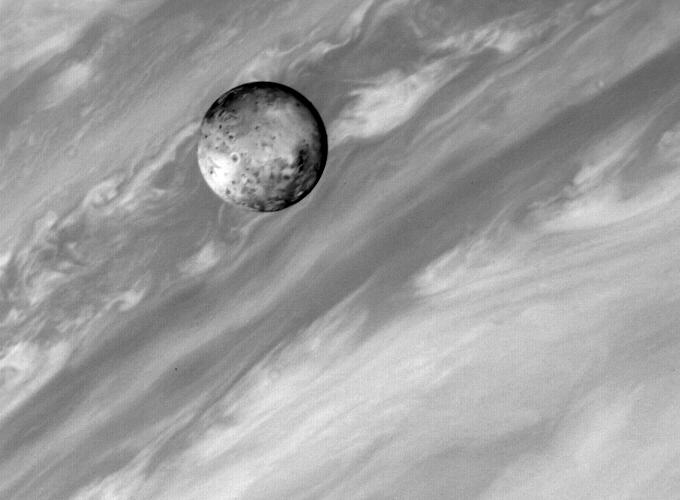
Voyager 1 approach image of Io, with Jupiter's clouds in the background

Voyager 1 provided the first images of the different geologic structures on Io. These were later used to identify key volcanic features, including color of magma to deduce composition and determine eruption sequences. The Voyager provided poor resolution photos (5–20 km/pixel) of the Chaac-Camaxtli region, which provided little further study. The photos were, however, used to map dark spots of Chaac Patera, Camaxtli Patera, and another region which is now considered Sobo Fluctus. An important discovery was Io's lack of impact craters, meaning it is resurfaced at a geologically fast rate.

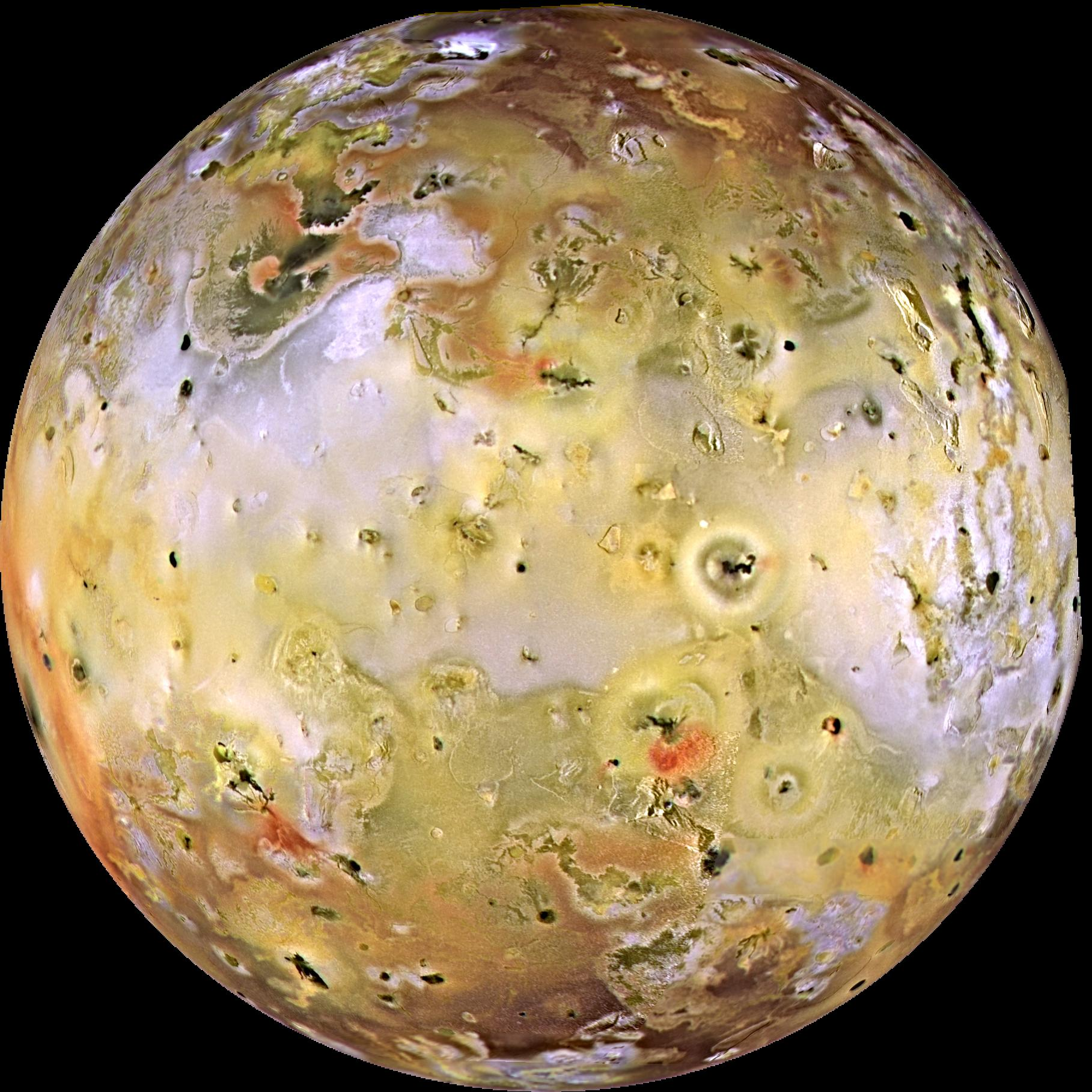
Galileo photomosaic of Io, acquired in November 1996

The main imagery used in viewing the area was produced by the Galileo I27 flyby which occurred in February 2000, which was paired with C21 low-resolution (1.4 km/pixel) color schemes. Because of the success of these pictures, different volcanic features were identified and appropriately named.

== Geography ==
=== Chaac Patera ===
The Galileo I27 flyby of Io provided very detailed photos (5–10 m/pixel) of Chaac Patera. This patera is located at (11.8°N, 157.2°W) and defines the western edge of the Chaac-Camaxtli region. It is named after the Mayan god of thunder and rain. The patera walls are ~4 km tall and the average slope of them is ~70°. Its dimensions are 105 km X 48 km. The patera appears to be situated on a large plateau, that declines elevation on each side. The steep scarps also suggest that the materials it's made out of must be tough to avoid collapse.

This patera is often dubbed "golf course" because of its presence of green material on the floor, detected by NIMS. NIMS (near-infrared mass spectrometer) is used to interpret thermal data. The floor of the patera is covered in lava, but the images cannot discern whether the green is a primary or secondary feature. The lava on the floor of the patera are thought to mimic morphologies similar to terrestrial calderas such as Kilauea Caldera in Hawaii. This is supported by their tendency to inflate or pool up when they are secluded, and also how they drain back into vents, resulting from escaping gases in the magma. This helps provide insight on how the lavas of the region operate.

Lava rises along rim fractures. This observation hints that the paterae on Io are formed by a combination of volcanism and tectonics.

The kidney shape is Chaac Patera. The lines around the patera represent ridge orientations. The thicker ridges are oriented at 010 azimuth and the thinner are at 088. Ridge orientation is formed by tidal fluxing.

The floors of the patera are covered in inflated lava flows and lakes, suggested by the "bathtub ring" structures and smaller islands. The lavas flow out, then sink back to their vents. A possible vent is located in the southernmost portion of the patera, which migrated from the north. Migration patterns can be concluded from changes in pictures from the Voyager to the Galileo. This agrees with the hot spot that has been found here as well. Many articles agree that a low to medium thickness layer of SO_{2} is present in the patera.

The ridge orientations around the patera could provide information on the regional lithosphere. The ridges are oriented in a constant 010° azimuth, independent of patera wall orientation. There are also smaller ridges present with an 088° azimuth. These ridges appear to be of no influence of local mountains or faults. Instead, the ridge orientations are formed by tidal flexing of Io by Jupiter.

=== Camaxtli Patera ===
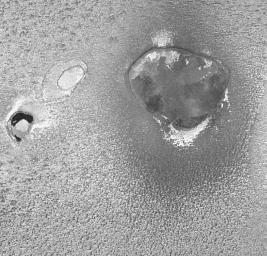
The right feature is Camaxtli Patera. The dark flows on the floor and halo composed of dark diffuse material can be seen.

Camaxtli Patera is on the eastern edge of the Chaac-Camaxtli region (15°N,136°W). It is named after the Aztec god of thunder, tornado, and war. There is a hot spot in the patera. Most imaging of the patera come from NIMS, and orbits E15, I24, and I27 of the Galileo flybys. The patera features dark flows on its floor, along with a dark rim, possibly from the lava being erupted from faults at the bases of the walls. There is a moderate abundance of white SO_{2} concentration in the region. The patera also has a dark halo around it, composed of dark diffuse material. The extensive amount of dark material in and around the patera coupled with differences in Voyager and Galileo photos suggests that it is quite active. This observation is supported by NIMS data. The vent location has migrated from the east side to the west side of the patera.

=== Sobo Fluctus ===
Sobo Fluctus is a dark volcanic flow field located in the Chaac-Camaxtli region of Io. It is named after the Voodoo spirit of thunder. The coordinates are (14°N, 151°W). The estimated temperature here is ~130K. The estimated area of dark material is ~1.3 X 10^{3} km^{2}. The dark flows are surrounded by bright lava flows that are thought to be secondary sources of volcanism rich in sulfur and SO_{2}.

== Surface colors ==
Mapping of the Chaac-Camaxtli region is primarily based on the mapping done by Williams et al. in 2002. The mapping was based on color and textural differences on the surface. Differences in color and texture show what types of magma have erupted and give rise to what is located in the interior of Io.

=== Hummocky bright plains ===
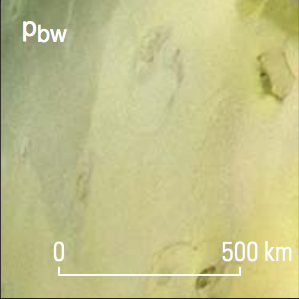
Hummocky bright plains

The Chaac-Camaxtli region accounts for a large portion of the bright plains found on the equatorial region of Io. The albedo of these regions is in between that of Dark and Bright Patera Floor Materials, linked to SO_{2} abundance and grain size. Hummocky textures are described as mounds or ridges that are raised in elevation compared to the surrounding material. The hummocks occur in relatively uniform size (~200–500 m wide, ~1–2 km long). They are usually found in groups. The hummocky texture is hard to see at low resolution photos, but higher resolution photos make them appear and also show orientation patterns. Near the eastern portion of Chaac Patera, orientation is perpendicular to margin. There are a number of different theories regarding the origin of the hummocky texture, however not enough is known to rule out or favor different ideas. These areas show enrichment in SO_{2}. This indicates a colder part of the surface that preserves the SO_{2}. The source of the colder temperatures that allows SO_{2} to concentrate here could be linked to magma delivery mechanisms or relative lithosphere thickness.

=== Dark patera ===
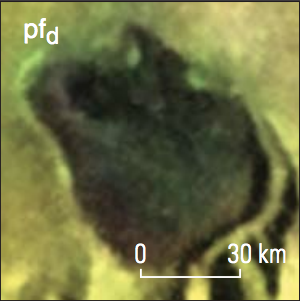
Dark patera

This material is described by Williams et al. as green to grey to black with large variation in albedo and texture. At low resolution, they appear smooth, but at higher resolution, hummocks and combinations of dark and light material are seen. Little SO_{2} is thought to be present, based on NIMS data. This material is found in Chaac Patera and thought to mimic the Kilauea Caldera floor overall, which would form from low viscosity, dark lavas ranging from mafic to ultramafic composition. Hummocks or pits are thought to be from the effect of inflation or vent openings that are common in this type of lava flow. Dark colored materials are the source of more heat.

=== Bright patera floor material ===
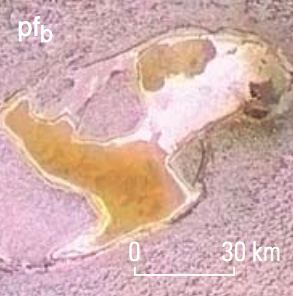
Bright patera

Bright patera floor material is thought to be SO_{2}/sulfur-rich. The material is thought to consist of frozen layers of white SO_{2} and orange layers of SO_{2}/sulfur-rich deposits with other elements mixed in. This material is found mostly inside of paterae, but also can be found along the rims.

=== Bright flow ===
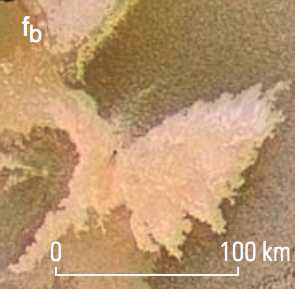
Bright flow

This material is illustrated by a smooth flow in medium resolution. Color ranges from orange to white with flow lengths greater than their widths. These flows are interpreted as low-viscosity flows with sulfur-rich constituents. Albedo and cross-cutting is used to determine relative ages in the flows. The lighter, brighter colors represent younger flows.

=== Undivided flow ===
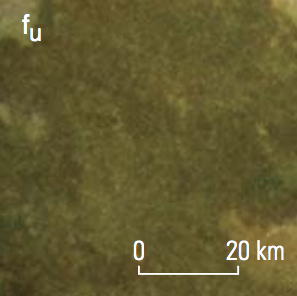
Undivided flow

Relatively intermediate albedos and smooth, several hundred meter flows typify these materials. Contact with surrounding terrain not as sharp as observed with bright and dark flow material. Origin of flows is often hard to tell. It is difficult to distinguish individual flows in a group. It is believed to have origin in sulfur/silicate-rich effusive eruptions.

=== Dark flow ===
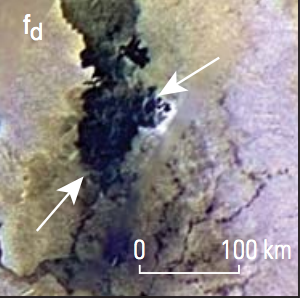
Dark flow

These flows are darker in color and are usually hotter according to NIMS observations. The length is generally greater than their width. The height of them tend to be larger based on the shadows they create. The Chaac Patera hot spot is a good example of this type of flow. Lava composition varies, but usually it is low-viscosity, mafic to ultramafic in composition.

=== Bright diffuse material ===
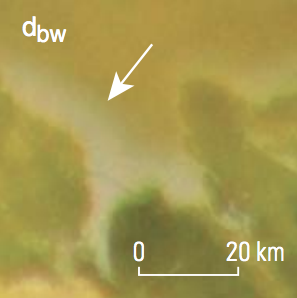
Bright diffuse material

These units are thought to be explosively pyroclastic in origin. They can range in size up to tens of kilometers. They usually occur near volcanic cones (Camaxtli Patera).

=== Dark diffuse material ===
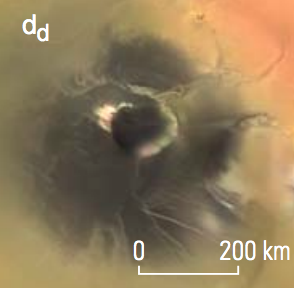
Dark diffuse material

Similar to bright diffuse materials, but with darker color. These are associated with the halo surrounding the rim on Camaxtli Patera. Darker color materials are the source of more heat. .

=== Red diffuse material ===
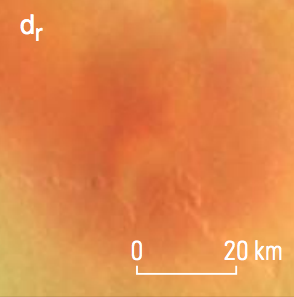
Red diffuse material

Only one occurrence of this unit has been mapped in the area, at Sobo Fluctus. This material is related to explosive pyroclastic eruptions around volcanic cones. These materials are thought to come from vents by condensation of S_{2} gas and recrystallization of short-chain sulfur

== Implications ==
There is a connection between volcanism and crustal thickness on the subsurface of Io. Thinner crust produces dense, mafic, dark flows that cover larger areas and where secondary, more sulfurous flows occur. Conversely, in thicker crust regions, the more dense lavas do not occur as often. Crustal thickness is thought to be related to tidal flexing in the interior of Io. The shift from dark, freshly erupted material into bright plains material may support the notion that Io has strong crustal materials that can support the steep paterae walls. The lithosphere of Io is thought to be well-fractured, which is supported by the paterae hot spot migration between the times of the Voyager and the Galileo flybys. The idea that Io's lithosphere is composed of a partially crystallized magma ocean would make magma's ability to rise to the surface change, thus changing the vent migrations of paterae as well.
