= Ra Patera =

Volcano located on Io

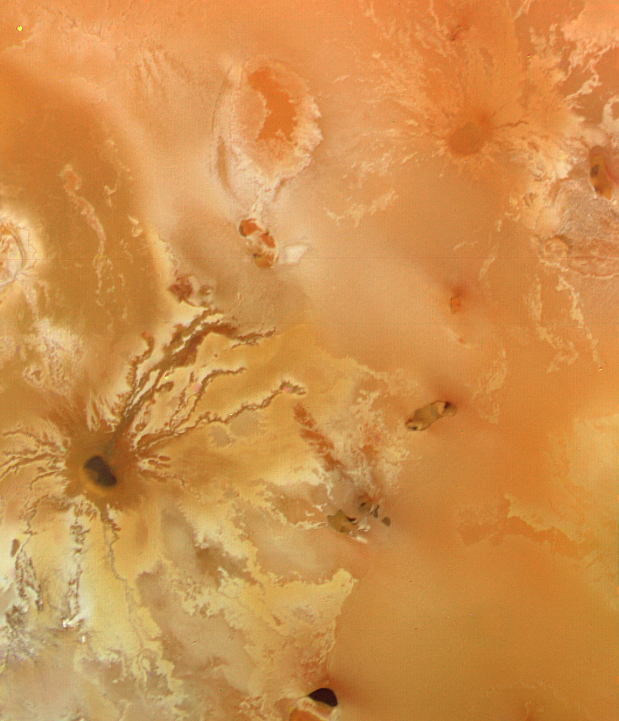
Voyager 1 image showing lava flows radiating from Ra Patera at lower left (March 5, 1979).

Ra Patera is an extraterrestrial volcano located on Io, one of the four Galilean moons of Jupiter. An active volcano, it was first studied in 1979 via Voyager stereo imagery to determine its geology, topography, and the source of its eruptions. When first discovered, the mountain reached about one kilometer in height and featured numerous lava flows of either low viscosity or "high eruption rates". It is possibly a liquid sulfur-erupting volcano.
