= Fire (disambiguation) =

Fire is the rapid oxidation of a material in the chemical process of combustion.

Fire or Fires may also refer to:

== People ==
- Fire (surname), including list of people with the name
- Fire (wrestler), ring name of Mexican professional wrestler Vicente Serrano (born 1973)

== Film and television ==
=== Film ===
- Fire! (1901 film), British
- The Fire (1916 film), Italian
- Fire! (1977 film), American TV movie
- Fire! (1991 film), Malian
- Fire (1996 film), Indian
- Fire (2002 film), Pakistani
- The Fire (2015 film), Argentine
- Fire (2020 film), Russian
- Fire (2025 film), Indian

=== Television ===
- Fire (Lexx), a planet in the multinational TV series Lexx
- Fire (TV series), a 1995 Australian television series
- "Fire" (The X-Files), a 1993 episode of the American series
- "The Fire" (Seinfeld), a 1994 episode of the American series
- "The Fire" (The Office), a 2005 episode of the American series
- "The Fire" (Under the Dome), a 2013 episode of the American series
- "Fire", a 1984 episode in the American series The A-Team
- "Fire!", an episode of the American series Daria
- Fires (TV series), a 2021 Australian anthology television series

== Literature ==
=== Comics and manga ===
- Fire (character), a DC Comics character
- Fire (Image Comics), a miniseries by Brian Michael Bendis
- Fire! (manga), a shōjo manga series by Hideko Mizuno
- Fires (comic book), a 1984 comic by Lorenzo Mattotti

=== Novels ===
- Fire (Stewart novel), 1948
- Fire (2012 novel), by Mats Strandberg and Sara Bergmark Elfgren
- Fire (Cashore novel), 2009
- Fire (Rodgers novel), 1990
- The Fire (Neville novel), 2008, by Katherine Neville

=== Other uses in literature ===
- Fire!!, a 1926 African American literary magazine
- Fire (magazine), a firearms magazine
- Fires (Yourcenar book), 1936, by Marguerite Yourcenar
- The Fire: The Bombing of Germany, 1940–1945, a 2002 book by Jörg Friedrich
- Sourcebooks Fire, a young adult fiction imprint of American publisher Sourcebooks

== Music ==
=== Albums ===
- Fire (The Bug album), 2021
- Fire (Electric Six album), 2003
- Fire (Fleurine album), 2005
- Fire (Kittie album), 2024
- Fire (Markus Feehily album), 2015
- Fire (Mark Simmonds Freeboppers album), 1993
- Fire (Ohio Players album), 1974
- Fire (Wild Orchid album), 2001
- Fires (Nerina Pallot album), 2005
- Fires (Ronan Keating album), 2012
- The Fire (Heatwave album), 1988
- The Fire (Matt Cardle album), 2012
- The Fire (Senses Fail album), 2010
- Fire, the Acoustic Album, by Izzy Stradlin, 2007
- Fire! Live at the Village Vanguard, David Newman, 1989
- Fire, by Marek Biliński, 2008

=== Groups ===
- Fire (Australian band), an Australian gothic and acid rock band
- Fire (English band), a 1960s–1970s English group
- The Fire (band), a 2000s Chilean group

=== Musicals ===
- Fire (musical), a 1985 Canadian musical

=== Record labels ===
- F-IRE Collective, a creative music community in London
- Fire Records (UK), a British independent record label
- Fire Records, an American record label

=== Songs ===
- "Fire" (2NE1 song), 2009
- "Fire" (Amy Macdonald song), 2021
- "Fire" (Arthur Brown song), 1968
- "Fire" (Autumn Hill song), 2013
- "Fire" (Barns Courtney song), 2015
- "Fire" (Beth Ditto song), 2017
- "Fire" (Big Sean song), 2013
- "Fire" (Bruce Springsteen song), 1977, made famous by the Pointer Sisters' 1979 cover
- "Fire" (BTS song), 2016
- "Fire" (Dead by Sunrise song), 2010
- "Fire" (Ferry Corsten song), 2005
- "Fire" (The Jimi Hendrix Experience song), 1967
- "Fire" (Joe Budden song), 2003
- "Fire" (Kasabian song), 2009
- "Fire" (Kids See Ghosts song), 2018
- "Fire" (Krystal Meyers song), 2005
- "Fire" (Lacuna Coil song), 2012
- "Fire" (Leona Lewis song), 2015
- "Fire" (Meduza, OneRepublic and Leony song), 2024
- "Fire" (Michelle Williams song), 2013
- "Fire" (Ohio Players song), 1974
- "Fire" (Prodigy song), 1992
- "Fire" (Sarah Engels song), 2026
- "Fire" (Scooter song), 1997
- "Fire" (Shinee song), 2013
- "Fire" (U2 song), 1981
- "Fire", by 50 Cent from Curtis, 2007
- "Fire!", by Alan Walker, Yuqi, Jvke and (G)I-dle on the 2025 album Walkerworld 2.0, 2023
- "Fire", by Alessia Cara from Love & Hyperbole, 2025
- "Fire", by Alexandra Burke from Heartbreak on Hold, 2012
- "Fire", by Atheist from Elements, 1993
- "Fire", by Ayọ from Ticket to the World, 2013
- "Fire", by Beartooth from Disease, 2018
- "Fire", by Black Pumas from Black Pumas, 2019
- "Fire", by B-Real from Smoke N Mirrors, 2009
- "Fire", by Busta Rhymes from Anarchy, 2000
- "Fire", by The Devil Wears Prada from Color Decay, 2022
- "Fire", by Don Broco from Automatic, 2015
- "Fire", by Firewind from Between Heaven and Hell, 2002
- "Fire", by Jaden Smith from CTV2, 2014
- "Fire", by Jason Derulo from Tattoos, 2013
- "Fire", by Jay Sean from All or Nothing, 2009
- "Fire", by Jessie J from Sweet Talker, 2014
- "Fire", by Justice from Woman, 2016
- "Fire", by Keyone Starr which represented Mississippi in the American Song Contest
- "Fire", by Kittie from Fire, 2024
- "Fire", by Krokus from Metal Rendez-vous, 1980
- "Fire", by Markus Feehily from Fire, 2015
- "Fire!", by Panda Bear from Panda Bear, 1999
- "Fire", by Puressence from Puressence, 1996
- "Fire", by PVRIS, from White Noise, 2014
- "Fire", by Raghav from The Phoenix, 2012
- "Fire", by Sleeping with Sirens from Let's Cheers to This, 2011
- "Fire", by Soulfly from Soulfly, 1998
- "Fire', by Yungblud from Idols, 2025
- "Fire", by Tina Barrett, 2012
- "Fire", by Waxahatchee from Saint Cloud, 2020
- "Fires" (song), by Ronan Keating from Fires, 2012
- "Fires", by Band of Skulls from Baby Darling Doll Face Honey, 2009
- "Fires", by SoMo from SoMo, 2014
- "The Fire", by Reel Big Fish from We're Not Happy 'til You're Not Happy, 2015

== Other media ==
- Fire (Game & Watch), a 1980 game released by Nintendo
- Fire (pinball)!, a 1987 pinball machine
- Fire: Ungh's Quest, a 2015 game developed by Daedalic Entertainment
- Fire, the original name for the Pokémon species Moltres

== Sports ==
- Birmingham Fire, an American football team
- Queensland Fire, an Australian cricket team
- Rhein Fire (NFL Europe), an American football team in NFL Europe
- Southeastern Fire, the college sports teams of Southeastern University in Florida, US
- Chicago Fire FC, an MLS club in Chicago, US
- Portland Fire, a WNBA team in Portland, OR, US

== Technology ==
- Fire (OS), an Android-based mobile operating system by Amazon
- Autodesk Fire, a video digital editing system

== Other uses ==
- Fire (classical element), an element in ancient Greek philosophy and science
- Fire (wuxing), a philosophical element in Chinese philosophy
- Fire department, an emergency service
- Fires (military), one of the six warfighting functions
- Febrile infection-related epilepsy syndrome (FIRES)

== See also ==
- Daag: The Fire, a 1999 Indian film
- Fyre (disambiguation)
- Fiers (disambiguation), including a list of people with the surname
- Firer, a surname (including a list of people with the name)
- Firing (disambiguation)
- This Fire (disambiguation)
- Fiyah (disambiguation)
