= Torch (disambiguation) =

A torch is a portable burning light source.

Torch or torches may also refer to:

== Places ==
- Torch, Missouri, a community in the United States
- Torch, Ohio, a community in the United States
- Torch Club, a historic music venue in Sacramento, California
- The Marina Torch, a residential skyscraper in Dubai
- The Torch, a skyscraper in NYC, see 740 Eighth Avenue

== People ==
- Torch (American rapper), an American rapper
- Torch (German rapper), a German rapper
- An alias of Moka Only, a Canadian rapper, singer, and record producer
- Warren DeMartini, nicknamed "Torch", a guitarist for the American hard rock band Ratt
- Sidney Torch, a British composer and bandleader
- Robert Torricelli, a U.S. Senator from New Jersey nicknamed "the Torch"

== Arts, entertainment, and media ==
=== Fictional entities ===
- Torch (G.I. Joe), a character in the G.I. Joe universe
- Torch, a human replacement entity utilized in the world of Shakugan no Shana novels
- Human Torch, the Fantastic Four comic book character

=== Music ===
==== Albums ====
- Torch (Carly Simon album), a 1981 album by Carly Simon
- Torch (Honeytribe album), a 2006 album by Devon Allman's Honeytribe
- Torches (album), the debut album by Foster the People

==== Songs ====
- "Torch" (song), a 1982 song by British pop duo Soft Cell
- "Torch", the ending song for the anime Clannad
- "Torch", a 2007 song by American rock duo Pinback from their album Autumn of the Seraphs
- "The Torch" (Elgar), a song by the English composer Edward Elgar
- "The Torch", a song by Scottish musician Momus from the album Scobberlotchers
- "Torches" (carol), a 1951 Christmas carol composed by John Joubert
- "Torches" (song), a 2016 song by Daughtry
- "Torches", a 2017 song by X Ambassadors

==== Other uses in music ====
- Torch (band), a Norwegian rock metal band
- "Torch song", a type of love song

=== Print media ===
- Torch (novel), a 2007 novel by American author Cheryl Strayed
- The Torch (novel), a 1948 science fiction novel by Jack Bechdolt
- TORCH report, a written report on the Chernobyl disaster
- The Torch (St. John's University), student newspaper
- The Torch, the student newspaper of University of Massachusetts Dartmouth

=== Other uses in arts, entertainment, and media ===
- Torch (juggling), a prop used by jugglers
- The Torch (film), a 1950 film directed by Emilio Fernández
- "Torches", an episode of the television series Teletubbies

== Computing and technology ==
- Torch (browser), a freeware Web browser and Internet suite developed by Torch Media
- Torch (company), manufacturer of fire detection sensors
- Torch (machine learning), a library of machine learning algorithms
- BlackBerry Torch, a smartphone
- Torch Computers, former manufacturer of computers
- Torch (chess engine), a computer chess engine

== Tools ==
- Torch, or flashlight, a portable hand-held electric light
- Blowtorch, fuel-burning metalworking tool used for applying flame and heat
- Magnesium torch, used as an underwater light source
- Oxyacetylene torch, see Oxy-fuel welding and cutting

== Other uses ==
- Operation Torch, the Anglo-American invasion of French North Africa in World War II during the North African Campaign
- TORCH, The Oxford Research Centre in the Humanities
- TORCH complex (aka TORCHES), a healthcare mnemonic for maternal infections transmitted to the fetus
- TORCH syndrome, a cluster of symptoms caused by congenital infection
- Torch Commando, South African organisation, founded in 1941 during the Second World War

== See also ==
- Torched (disambiguation)
