= Firing =

Firing may refer to:

- Dismissal (employment), sudden loss of employment by termination
- Firemaking, the act of starting a fire
- Burning; see combustion
- Shooting, specifically the discharge of firearms
- Execution by firing squad, a method of capital punishment
- Pottery firing in a kiln or oven
- Pin firing, an old medical treatment applied to horses
- An action potential, where the depolarization of a neuron causes it to "fire" off an electrical signal down its axon
- Any material (such as firewood) that can be burned as fuel to release energy

== See also ==
- Fire and Fire (disambiguation)
- Fired (disambiguation)
- Firing squad (disambiguation)
- Fire-raising (disambiguation)
- Fire making
- Firestarter (disambiguation)
