= Coup de Grâce (1976 film) =

- Directed by: Volker Schlöndorff
- Screenplay by: Jutta Brückner; Margarethe von Trotta; Geneviève Dormann
- Based on: Coup de Grâce; 1939 novel by Marguerite Yourcenar
- Produced by: Eberhard Junkersdorf; Anatole Dauman
- Starring: Margarethe von Trotta; Matthias Habich; Rüdiger Kirschstein
- Cinematography: Igor Luther
- Edited by: Henri Colpi
- Music by: Stanley Myers
- Color process: Black and white
- Production companies: Argos Films; Bioskop Film; Hessischer Rundfunk
- Distributed by: Filmverlag der Autoren
- Release date: 22 October 1976 (West Germany)
- Running time: 97 minutes
- Countries: West Germany; France
- Languages: German; French

Coup de Grâce (German: Der Fangschuss, French: Le Coup de grâce) is a 1976 West German drama war film directed by Volker Schlöndorff. Adapted from the novel Coup de Grâce by the French author Marguerite Yourcenar, the war film explores passion amid underlying political tones. The title comes from the French expression, meaning "finishing blow". An opening title dedicates the film to Jean-Pierre Melville, for whom Schlöndorff had worked as an assistant director.

== Plot ==
In 1919 Latvia, a detachment of German Freikorps soldiers is stationed in a country chateau, referred to as Kratovice, not far from Riga, to fight Bolshevik guerrillas in the Latvian War of Independence, one element of the much broader Russian Civil War that followed the Bolshevik Revolution. The soldiers, led by Erich von Lhomond, are welcomed with open arms by the mansion's inhabitants, including Countess Sophie von Reval, her half-senile Jewish aunt Praskovia, and some servants. The chateau, it turns out, is the home of the soldiers' leader, Konrad von Reval, Sophie's brother. Erich had also been a childhood friend of Konrad and Sophie, and she now finds herself falling in love with him, though Erich insists he is much more in favor of friendships than women.

Sophie has contacts with the nearby Bolshevik forces, especially with Jewish tailor Grigori Loew, from whom Sophie borrows some Bolshevik reading materials. Early on, one German war veteran who is now fighting for the Bolsheviks is captured, questioned, and summarily executed by a firing squad. In the meantime, Sophie and her aunt try to keep up appearances, holding dinners and providing entertainment for the officers as best as they can, with their supplies of food and drink dwindling. From time to time, Erich or some of his men go to their headquarters in Riga, sometimes returning with food or treats.

Erich, like others under his command, has joined the Freikorps due to lacking any other prospects or purpose in life following Germany's defeat in World War I. Although he loosens up at times with Konrad and Sophie, he generally maintains an air of military professionalism and emotional detachment (such as scolding Sophie for smoking). Sophie's own apparent free spirit is belied when the medic tells Erich how she had been raped some time previously by a drunken Lithuanian soldier. She attempts several times to attract and even seduce Erich, but he rebuffs her advances, usually passively but sometimes with anger, such as when he publicly slaps Sophie under the mistletoe at Christmas after she provocatively kisses an old friend of Erich's from school. Frustrated, she turns to other men in the unit, having sex with them while Erich is aware. She also willingly exposes herself to danger, riding on horseback and opening blackout curtains.

Over time, some of the men with whom Sophie has been intimate die during battles or on the road to and from Riga. It is already clear to Erich and others that the uneasy anti-Bolshevik coalition is falling apart. After being informed that no reinforcements are coming and all German troops are expected to withdraw by the New Year, Erich leads an offensive that results in the loss of the only medic. Meanwhile, Erich's childhood friend tells Sophie of Erich's attraction to Konrad, implying something happened on their most recent trip to Riga. Sophie leaves to join the Bolsheviks, confronting Erich about his secret as she goes.

Konrad is killed in the withdrawal. While ambushing the retreating soldiers, Grigori is killed and Sophie is captured. Erich offers to take Sophie to Germany; Sophie steals Erich's cigarettes. The train to Germany is delayed due to attack, so everyone has the rest of the night to steel themselves. In the morning, when Sophie's time to be executed comes, she demands that Erich shoot her. Erich shoots her in the head with his pistol, poses with his men for a group photo, and boards the waiting troop train, all in summary fashion.

== Adaptation and film style ==
The events of the novel, Marguerite Yourcenar's Coup de Grâce (1939), are narrated from the first-person point of view of the soldier Erich von Lhomond. In the film, some voice-over comments from Erich come at the beginning and end and in a few other scenes. However, the film's narrative structure and visuals make central the character of Sophie von Reval, played by Margarethe von Trotta, who co-wrote the screenplay. P.J.R. Nair comments, "Schlöndorff has, in fact, reconfigured the point of view within the narrative situation: Sophie turns into Erich's co-protagonist. . . . instead of an officer and his memories, a woman moves to the forefront along with the conflicts of her emotions, her epoch, and her environment. In the adaptation process, Schlöndorff has set up an unusual narrative structure. On one hand, he is taking a book that features a male point of view and evokes the genre of the war film––a genre usually characterized by a male point of view. On the other hand, the shift away from a first-person male narrator represents here a subverting of the war film's usual masculine perspective."

In addition, the war is only a vague backdrop in the novel but has a more significant presence in the film. However, its effects are often seen only after the fact and the most violent battle scenes often take place offscreen or in visually distanced vignettes. At one point, the Bolshevik forces shell a trench surrounding the Kratovice estate. Sophie has accompanied Erich to this battle line and flinches when mortar shells explode nearby, but we see only portions of the bodies of the men who were hit as she and Erich retreat. Earlier in that scene, we share Sophie's physical point of view as she looks across the battlefield through Erich's rangefinder and is startled to realize that Grigori is a member of the opposing force as they retreat with a wounded comrade.

When Erich is told that Sophie herself had been raped by a sergeant before his group's arrival, his typically dispassionate response highlights the gap between the stated event and his military mindset. The deaths of some key characters become known only when we see their dead or wounded bodies being transported by their comrades. Even the death of Sophie's dog, named Texas, killed by digging up a grenade, is revealed only when Erich opens the closet where Sophie had placed the dog's body.

Hans-Bernard Moeller and George Lellis remark that "One can argue that Schlöndorff assembles an array of alienating strategies that operate subtly and scrape against the grain of a superficially realist narrative. This movie's narrative contains many gaps and ellipses, as well as many places where, with characterizations developed only through externalized behavior, motivation is implicit or ambiguous; all of these require an alert viewer to fill in what is missing." Similarly, Vincent Canby, in his New York Times review, calls Coup de Grâce "an extremely studied, sorrowful movie, photographed in a fine, chilly black and white that has the important effect of removing the story even further away from our emotions. We don't respond to it viscerally. We contemplate it with a certain amount of detachment . . .

In addition to deliberately muted performances by the actors, distancing effects are also enhanced when scenes often break off abruptly, cutting directly to another time or setting without revealing the outcome of conversations and encounters in the prior scene. Some scenes are deliberately stylized visually, notably when an enemy airplane appears above the manor at night. An even more abrupt change of style occurs when we see the car with soldiers returning from an "R&R" trip to Riga. The soldiers' behavior, music, and camera framing present the scene as though it were from a musical comedy.

== Cast ==
- Matthias Habich as Erich von Lhomond
- Margarethe von Trotta as Sophie von Reval
- Rüdiger Kirschstein as Conrad von Reval
- Mathieu Carrière as Volkmar von Plessen
- Valeska Gert as Aunt Praskovia
- Marc Eyraud as Dr. Paul Rugen
- Bruno Thost as Chopin
- Henry van Lyck as Borschikoff
- Hannes Kaetner as Michel
- Franz Morak as Grigori Loew
- Frederik von Zichy as Franz von Aland
- Alexander von Eschwege as Blankenberg
- Maria Guttenbrunner as Mutter Loew
- Stephan Paryla as Sergeant
