= Arson (disambiguation) =

Arson is the crime of willfully and deliberately setting fire to property.

Arson may also refer to:

- Nicholaus Arson, Niklas Almqvist (born 1977), Swedish musician, lead guitarist of the Hives
- "Arson", a 2004 song by Amon Amarth from Fate of Norns
- "Arson", a 2022 song by J-Hope from Jack in the Box
- A.R.S.O.N., a 2026 album by Story of the Year

== See also ==
- Arsonists (disambiguation)
- Torched (disambiguation)
- Fire-raising (disambiguation)
- Fire making
- Pyromania
