= Trip the Darkness =

Single by Lacuna Coil

from the album Dark Adrenaline
- Released: 17 October 2011
- Genre: Gothic metal
- Length: 3:14
- Label: Century Media
- Songwriters: Marco Biazzi, Marco Coti Zelati, Andrea Ferro, Don Gilmore, Cristiano Migliore, Cristiano Mozzati, Cristina Scabbia
- Producer: Don Gilmore

Lacuna Coil singles chronology
"Wide Awake" (2009)	"Trip the Darkness" (2011)	"Fire" (2012)

"Trip the Darkness" is a song by Italian gothic metal band Lacuna Coil, from their sixth studio album Dark Adrenaline (2012). The song was written by Lacuna Coil, while production of the song was handled by Don Gilmore. The song was given its first play on SiriusXM on September 19, 2011, and was released as the first single from the album on 17 October 2011, in Europe and on October 18, 2011, in the United States. "Trip the Darkness" was met with a positive reception from the fans, who praised the return of the band to the original dark sound. An exclusive remix by The Dillinger Escape Plan guitarist Ben Weinman appears on the soundtrack to Underworld: Awakening

== Artwork ==
The dark drawn cover artwork for the single shows a little girl was designed by the bassist of the band Marco Coti Zelati, he did the illustration of the cover for the single which underlines how personal the song is to the band.

== Critical reception ==
"Trip the Darkness" has received a largely positive reception from critics and fans alike upon release. Liz Ramanand from Loudwire gave the song 4 stars out of 5 and called the song a "dark yet very poetic track" whilst praising it for being "almost like an Edgar Alan Poe poem put to music". Kaj Nocturnal from theblackflag gave the song 10 stars out of 10, saying that "it's unlike anything ever released by the band" and concluded "this is the best work they have ever done".

== Chart performance ==
In the United States, "Trip the Darkness" debuted on the US Active rock chart in top 40 on November 9, 2011 but peaking at #23 on February 11, 2012. On 9 December "Trip the Darkness" won in the "metal/hard rock" category on iTunes Italy. "Trip The Darkness" is number 2 in Loudwire.com's Top Rock Songs of 2011. It also peaked at #28 on the US Mainstream Rock Tracks chart on February 4, 2012.

== Music video ==
Black & White themed video for Trip the Darkness

The music video for "Trip the Darkness" was filmed in Milan and was released on December 14, 2011. The directors are Sitcom Soldiers, It was mostly shot in black and white theme. The band wears one outfit of total black and one of total white throughout the video as they play facing off with themselves in a world of alternate reality.

- Director: Ben Thornley and Paul Burrows (Sitcom Soldiers)
- Producer: Sitcomsoldiers
- Director of Photography: Sitcom Soldiers
- Editor: Sitcom Soldiers
- Production Company: Sitcom Soldiers

== Charts ==
Chart (2011)	Peak position
US Billboard Active Rock	23
US Billboard Mainstream Rock Tracks	28

== Release history ==
Country	Date	Format	Label
United States	September 19, 2011	Radio premiere	Century Media
Italy	October 3, 2011	Radio premiere	Century Media
Italy	October 17, 2011	Digital download	Century Media
United States	October 18, 2011	Digital download	Century Media
