= Torched =

Torched may refer to:

- Torched (album), a Michael Hedges album
- Torched (film), a 2004 horror film
- Torched, an item that is burnt as the result of arson

== See also ==
- Arson (disambiguation)
- Torch (disambiguation)
