= Arsonists (disambiguation) =

Arsonists are people who commit arson.

Arsonists may also refer to:

- Arsonists (group)
- "Arsonists", a 1925 article by Georgy Bogdanovich Yakulov
- The Arsonists (play), 1953 play written by Max Frisch
- The Arsonists (film) (Brandstifter in German), a 1969 film produced by Westdeutscher Rundfunk
- The Arsonists, a 2017 opera written by Ian McMillan
- "Arsonists", a 2022 song by Ethan Bortnick

== See also ==
- Arson (disambiguation)
