= Coup de Grâce (novel) =

1939 French novel by Marguerite Yourcenar

- Author: Marguerite Yourcenar
- Original title: Le Coup de grâce
- Translator: Grace Frick
- Language: French
- Publisher: Éditions Gallimard
- Publication date: 1939
- Publication place: France
- English publication date: 1957
- Pages: 160

Coup de Grâce (French: Le Coup de grâce) is a 1939 short novel (or novella) in French by Marguerite Yourcenar. The narrative is a triangle drama set in the Baltics during the Russian Civil War (1917-1922).

== Story ==
The novel begins with Erick von Lhomond, recently wounded during the Spanish Civil War, returning to Germany via Italy. Among other mercenaries, he begins to tell his war story, which dates back to the Bolshevik Revolution.

Although he had trained to join the German military during World War I, he was still too young to fight before the war ended. His father, having died at Verdun, left the family in debt. Between his need to fight and his family's need for money, he decides to join German forces fighting the Bolsheviks in Kurland in what is modern-day Latvia (an episode of the Latvian War of Independence). Erick had spent the happiest times of his youth there with relatives in the home of the Count of Reval, which now served as a barracks for the fighters. Erick's childhood friend Conrad fights alongside him and Conrad's sister, Sophie helps to care for all of the soldiers.

Only a few years have passed since the happiness of his youth and Erick easily reconnects with Conrad. What he doesn't expect is the more mature attentions of Sophie. He continuously deflects her attentions, which become quite overt. He seems unwilling to be honest about the reasons for his dismissal of her advances—his feelings for Conrad. In the end, his time in that house, both as a child, and as a soldier was never about games or war, it was always about Conrad.

== Analysis ==
The novel is narrated exclusively from Erick's perspective, focusing on his internal thoughts and his perception of others. His inclination towards solitude, shaped by the instability of post-war Europe, prevents him from expressing his emotions to those around him.

Erick's youth means that he doesn't really know what he feels. He refers to his 'indispensable vice' and how it 'is much less the love for boys, than for solitude.

== Legacy ==
It was adapted into the 1976 film Coup de Grâce, directed by Volker Schlöndorff.

== See also ==
- 1939 in literature
- 20th-century French literature
