= Jutta Brückner =

German film director (born 1941)

- Born: 25 June 1941 (age 85); Düsseldorf, Germany
- Occupations: Film director, screenwriter, film producer
- Years active: 1975–2005

Jutta Brückner (born 25 June 1941 in Nazi Germany) is a German film director, screenwriter and film producer. She directed nine films between 1975 and 2005. Furthermore, she has written essays in film theory, film reviews and radio plays. She lives in Berlin and was Professor for narrative film at Berlin University of the Arts. She was the head of the jury at the 31st Berlin International Film Festival and is a member of multiple Film Juries and advisory committees.

Brückner's involvement in the women's movement influenced her emotional, intellectual, political, her artistic development and her work at all. Although she won multiple prizes for her work she is not a popular director and mainly known for making difficult and often painful films. Most of her films are highly autobiographical and have got a strong documentary style because of shooting them in 16mm. Furthermore, Brückner's first three films were shot in black and white. She uses her personal experience as a basis which she expanded to larger issues among women. Moreover, "she believes that film empowers women to display [the] psychic and physical disintegration [...] [and] sees film as nothing less than a recovery for women of the ability to look, to perceive."

== Early life and education ==
Brückner was born during the Second World War and was raised in a lower-middle-class family. Her adolescence was affected by the postwar Germany, left in ruins. So she witnessed, like other women growing up in this period, the rebuilding of Germany including the unquestioning submission of their mothers to the restoration of the patriarchal structures. Because of being an intelligent pupil Brückner was able to go to university and studied political science, philosophy and history in Berlin, Paris and Munich. She granted a Ph.D. with Die deutsche Staatswissenschaft im 18. Jahrhundert in 1973. She did not study at a film school nor undergo an apprenticeship in film or has been an assistant. Instead of that she wanted to write. In the 1970s, influenced by the women's movement and the evocation of many women in this period to escape from the patriarchal structures to a different life, "[her] desire to write grew out of a longing for 'female subjectivity'", but it was not satisfying herself. In one of her articles she writes: "I began filmmaking as an autodidact after giving up writing, which I had worked at for some time. No matter what I wrote, it was never what I wanted to write. It was not a question of good or bad, nor of true or false, but rather that I never reached the center of my desire to write, the center from which legitimation must come."

== Career ==
Unlike other filmmakers of her generation Brückner is completely self-taught. She has never studied film and before making her first film she had not any experience in filmmaking. Through a "biographical accident" she met some filmmakers and explored filmmaking as new appropriate opportunity for self-expression. After sending a script to all TV stations in West Germany, one section of the ZDF, Das kleine Fernsehspiel (The little television play), wanted to produce Brückner's first film to her surprise. In conjunction with this Elsaesser claims: "The result was a film which fused the autobiographical impulse so strategically important for the women’s movement with a formal structure as innovative as it was ingeniously simple." In this early phase of her career, in which she made three films, her films deal with the mother-daughter relationship and with women's relationships to their bodies.

=== Do Right and Fear No-One ===
This first film, Do Right and Fear No-One, is autobiographical and portraits the life of her mother. The mother's life is documented by still photographs from family albums, intermingled with photographs by August Sander's Menschen des XX.Jahrhunderts. By this combination Brückner wanted to show not only her mother's personal history but also the social history of the class milieu in Germany that had formed her mother's and other women's life in this time. Brückner's mother herself was intensely involved in this film by speaking the voice-over that distinguishes the narrative of the film. The film, which covers the years 1922 to 1975, traces the history and quest for identity of an older woman from a German petit-bourgeoisie between her seventh and sixtieth birthdays. The woman's personal repressions, anxieties, desires and deeply melancholy disappointment with life underline the ideology and acting of her small-town, rural class. On the one hand she becomes a representative of the German petit-bourgeoisie of the 20th century and on the other hand the sound and images emphasize her as unique and as an individual.

=== A Thoroughly Demoralized Girl: A Day in the Life of Rita Rischak ===
The next film of Brückner, A Thoroughly Demoralized Girl: A Day in the Life of Rita Rischak, again, is an autobiographical work and presents a fictional biography based on the life of a good friend of Brückner in documentary style. In one interview Brückner said: "Through my friend Rita, I showed a way of life that I had to decide against, even though it was still a part of me that was hidden." Her friend Rita is playing herself in this film. She speaks the voice-over of the protagonists interior monologues and is being interviewed. The film documents a normal day in the life of Rita Rischak, an office worker, searching for different forms of fulfillment. Furthermore, the film broaches the issue of problems with her parents, her child, lovers and work. She tries to achieve her desires but fails again and again because of chaotic ideas. It is about a woman who wants to change but she dreams of a prince which will rescue her from her daily life. The film reveals Rita's problems and self-destructive tendencies not merely as her personal guilt but also as the product of the society and the social structure in which she is mired.

=== The Hunger Years: In a Land of Plenty ===
Brückner's most well known film is, the award-winning, The Hunger Years: In a Land of Plenty. The film was screened at the Berlin International Film Festival and was acclaimed and well received in West Germany as well as abroad. The Hunger Years takes place between 1953 and 1956, the formative years of the West German Wirtschaftswunder and "portrays [three years of] an emotional starved adolescent, Ursula Scheuner, growing up in the 'golden Fifties' in the midst of plenty." Moreover, the film, again fictionalized autobiographic, "precisely maps the complex cultural landscape of [Brückner's] youth: the nation's denial of the Nazi past, its division into East and West, the cold war, anticommunism, sexual repression, and bulimic consumerism." The film focuses on two topics around the protagonist Ursula. On the one hand the mother-daughter relationship and on the other hand the difficulties of her in dealing with her restrictive environment. She is confronted with the sexual norms of her mother and with the mother's disgust with her own body. We witness the development of the protagonist's estranged relationship toward her body and her sexuality; Kosta describes this as "the emergence of a self-destructive, self-hating female subjectivity". This alienation leads to self-mutilation, mutism and finally, to a suicide attempt by overeating. The film is inweaved with Brückner's own voice-over, inner monologues, poems and fantasies to illustrate the protagonist's inner life. Another formal play is the disruption of the narrative unity by documentary footage such as newsreels and photos from the period. A strong picture in this film is the shot of a bloody sanitary napkin. "[It] is an emblem of all those things in women's lives that cannot be shown." According to film scholar Gwendolyn Audrey Foster, The Hunger Years "uncovers the cultural deprivation of adolescent females."

In the second phase of Brückner's career she experienced more with cinematic form in order to find her own film language after teaching herself how to make films by directing the previous three films. Although her later films are less directly autobiographical and made in a completely different aesthetic "one can still find many of the concerns of the earlier phase, especially with regard to the body." Among this films were Learning to Run, a film "about a woman whose breast cancer scare causes her to rethink her life", the award-winning One Glance and Love Breaks Out, Colossal Love and Do You Love Brecht?. The last two films are both biographies of female writers. Colossal Love about Rahel Varnhagen, a German-Jewish writer and Do You Love Brecht? about Margarete Steffin, the lover and colleague of Bertolt Brecht. Both the films focus on the question of identity and love, and the emotional struggle that leaves women powerless. One Glance and Love Breaks Out tells separately seven stories of women and "the obsessive pursuit of love unmindful of the cost to these women themselves."

=== Academy of the Arts, Berlin ===
From 1984 till 2006 Brückner was Professor at the Berlin University of the Arts. Since 1991 she has been a Member of the Academy of Arts, Berlin. Made deputy director of the film section in 2003, she was then chosen as director in 2009.

== Filmography ==
Director

- 1975: Tue recht und scheue niemand – Das Leben der Gerda Siepebrink (Do Right and Fear No-one)
- 1977: Ein ganz und gar verwahrlostes Mädchen – Ein Tag im Leben der Rita Rischak (A Thoroughly Demoralized Girl: A Day in the Life of Rita Rischak)
- 1980: The Hunger Years: In a Land of Plenty (Hungerjahre)
- 1982: Laufen Lernen (Learning to Run)
- 1983: Luftwurzeln (Roots in the Air)
- 1984-1993: Kolossale Liebe (Colossal Love)
- 1986: Ein Blick – und die Liebe bricht aus (One Glance, and Love Breaks Out)
- 1992: Lieben Sie Brecht? (Do You Love Brecht?)
- 1998: Bertolt Brecht – Liebe, Revolution und andere gefährliche Sachen
- 2005: Hitler Cantata

Screenwriter

- 1976: Der Fangschuss (Coup de Grâce) (directed by Volker Schlöndorff)
- 1977: Eine Frau mit Verantwortung (A Woman with Responsibility) (Ula Stöckl - for TV)

Radio plays

1977:

- Bis daß der Tod Euch scheidet
- Mein Babylon
- Der Kunst in die Arme geworfen

== Awards ==
1980:

- Critics Award at the German Critics Association Awards in Film in the category best feature for The Hunger Years: In a Land of Plenty
- FIPRESCI Prize at Berlin International Film Festival for The Hunger Years: In a Land of Plenty
- Audience Prize at Créteil International Women's Film Festival for The Hunger Years: In a Land of Plenty

1982:

- Critics Award at the German Critics Association Awards in Film in the category best short film for Luftwurzeln

1983:

- Audience Prize at Créteil International Women's Film Festival for Laufen lernen
- FICC-Prize at Figueira da Foz - Festival Internacional de Cinema for Laufen lernen

1986/87:

- Critics Award at the German Critics Association Awards in Film in the category best feature for Ein Blick – und die Liebe bricht aus

1998:

- Grand Prize at Figueira da Foz - Festival Internacional de Cinema in documentary for Bertolt Brecht – Liebe, Revolution und andere gefährliche Sachen
- Press Prize at Figueira da Foz - Festival Internacional de Cinema for Bertolt Brecht – Liebe, Revolution und andere gefährliche Sachen

2007:

- Best male actor (Hilmar Thate) at Batumi International Art House Film Festival for Hitler Cantata
- Tribute for outstanding achievement in the art of film at Denver International Film Festival
