= Fired =

Fired may refer to:

- A result of firing (disambiguation)
- "Fired", a song by Ben Folds from his 2001 debut solo album Rockin' the Suburbs
- Fired!, a 2007 documentary film by Annabelle Gurwitch
- Fired (2010 film), an Indian horror film
- Fired (1934 film), a Swedish drama film
