= A Coin in Nine Hands =

1934 novel by Marguerite Yourcenar

- Author: Marguerite Yourcenar
- Original title: Denier du rêve
- Translator: Dori Katz
- Language: French
- Publisher: Éditions Grasset
- Publication date: 1934
- Publication place: France
- English publication date: 1982
- Pages: 237

A Coin in Nine Hands (French: Denier du rêve) is a 1934 novel by the French writer Marguerite Yourcenar. A reworked edition was published in 1959.

== See also ==
- 1934 in literature
- 20th-century French literature
