= Dark Adrenaline =

Studio album by Lacuna Coil
- Released: 23 January 2012
- Recorded: 2010–2011
- Genres: Gothic metal, alternative metal
- Length: 45:10
- Languages: English; Italian
- Label: Century Media
- Producer: Don Gilmore

Lacuna Coil chronology
Shallow Life (2009)	Dark Adrenaline (2012)	Broken Crown Halo (2014)

Singles from Dark Adrenaline
- 1. "Trip the Darkness" Released: 17 October 2011; 2. "Fire" Released: 15 June 2012; 3. "End of Time" Released: 12 December 2012; 4. "Losing My Religion" Released: 2013

Dark Adrenaline is the sixth studio album by Italian gothic metal band Lacuna Coil. The album was produced by Don Gilmore (Linkin Park, Bullet For My Valentine), and mixed by Marco Barusso (Cayne, Modà, Laura Pausini, Eros Ramazzotti). It was released on 23 January 2012, and debuted at number fifteen on the Billboard 200 chart with initial sales of 20,000. It also charted in the top five on four other Billboard charts including the Rock Albums, Alternative Albums, Hard Rock Albums and the Independent Albums charts. The album was also successful throughout Europe, charting in ten countries, six of which Lacuna Coil have achieved their highest chart positions in those countries to date. This album has charted in fifteen countries.

The first single from the album, "Trip the Darkness", was released on 17 October 2011 before the album itself was released and is included as a remix on the soundtrack to Underworld: Awakening. "Fire" was released as the second single on 15 June 2012. The official music video was filmed on 10 May 2012.

The final track, "My Spirit", was made as a tribute to Peter Steele of Type O Negative.

== Reception ==
Professional ratings
Aggregate scores
Source	Rating
Metacritic	74/100
Review scores
Source	Rating
About.com	4/5 stars
AllMusic	4/5 stars
Loudwire	4/5 stars
Blabbermouth.net	8.5/10
Sputnikmusic	3.5/5

Upon its release, the album has received positive reviews from professional music critics who generally praised the mix of both Cristina Scabbia's and Andrea Ferro's vocals together and the return to their more Gothic roots after their previous release, Shallow Life. AllMusic gave the album a 4 out of 5 star rating describing the album as, "Bigger and bolder" than their 2009 release Shallow Life and stating it is the band's, "most explosive work to date". About.com give a similar 4 star review, stating the album as, "darker vibed" and, "bombastic" also going on to say that it is an album that can please newer and long-term fans. Loudwire gave a four out of five star review describing the tracks on the album as, "darker and rebellious", also describing vocals on the album as, "impeccable", despite saying that the album is not "out there". About.com described the cover of R.E.M.'s song, "Losing My Religion" as, "riskier" saying that, "it turned out pretty well".

== Track listing ==
All tracks are written by Lacuna Coil and Don Gilmore, except for "Losing My Religion" by R.E.M.

No.	Title	Length
1.	"Trip the Darkness"	3:12
2.	"Against You"	3:51
3.	"Kill the Light"	3:35
4.	"Give Me Something More"	3:56
5.	"Upsidedown"	3:04
6.	"End of Time"	3:53
7.	"I Don't Believe in Tomorrow"	4:12
8.	"Intoxicated"	3:48
9.	"The Army Inside"	3:12
10.	"Losing My Religion" (R.E.M. cover)	3:42
11.	"Fire"	2:55
12.	"My Spirit"	5:50
Total length:		45:10

Japanese Bonus Tracks
No.	Title	Length
13.	"Dark Adrenaline"	3:19
14.	"Soul Inmate"	3:22
Total length:		51:51

=== End of Time ===
End of Time was written by Lacuna Coil in collaboration with producer Don Gilmore, which received positive reviews from Music critics. Chad Bowar of About.com praised the harmony vocals, saying "[the song] is a very catchy power ballad that features some brief harmony vocals, which is something I wish Lacuna Coil would do more often.

==== Video ====
Cristina Scabbia and Andrea Ferro began shooting the music video for "End of Time" on 17 October 2011 in Milan, Italy. It was directed by their regular collaborator Roberto Cinardi with the pseudonym of SaKu, who previously directed Lacuna Coil's music videos for Spellbound (2009), I Won't Tell You (2010) and the short movie Dark Passengers (2012).

== Dark Passengers ==
Dark Passengers is a DVD that was included with the Digipack, Box Set and Darkest Adrenaline Super Deluxe Box Set editions of the album. It contains six short films shot by Roberto Cinardi with the pseudonym of SaKu (who already worked with the band for the videos of Spellbound and I Won't Tell You). The shorts contain the instrumental version of six songs from the standard issue of Dark Adrenaline. Every short has a member of the band as the main character and they represent Cristina's visions of the other members of the band after the Injection of the mysterious drug called "Dark Adrenaline". In the first video, based on "Give Me Something More", we see Cristina imprisoned by her evil twin. The second one, with "Intoxicated", shows Andrea as the protagonist of an adaptation of F. W. Murnau's Nosferatu. The third based on "Upsidedown" with Marco Biazzi as Jason Voorhees. The fourth with "Kill the Light" sees Cristiano Migliore playing the victim of a mad scientist. The fifth based on "Fire" with Marco Coti Zelati as a sushi chef. The last one with "Trip the Darkness" and Cristiano Mozzati as leads playing the role of a crazy akira.

No.	Title	Director	Length
1.	"Chapter I: The Injected" (featuring Cristina Scabbia)	SaKu	3:30
2.	"Chapter II: While You Sleep" (featuring Andrea Ferro and Cristina Scabbia)	SaKu	1:51
3.	"Chapter III: Carnage Euphoria" (featuring Marco Biazzi and Giulia Vespoli)	SaKu	2:36
4.	"Chapter IV: The Human Box" (featuring Cristiano Migliore, Andrea Ferro and Cristina Scabbia)	SaKu	2:56
5.	"Chapter V: All You Can Eat" (featuring Marco Coti Zelati, Andrea Ferro, Cristina Scabbia and Taiyo Yamanouchi)	SaKu	3:00
6.	"Chapter VI: The Sane Madness" (featuring Cristiano Mozzati)	SaKu	3:18

Credits for Dark Passengers are adapted from album liner notes.

- Directed by: SaKu
- Produced by: Kinesis Film
- Executive Producer: Marianna De Liso
- Production Coordinator: Serena Tagliaferri
- Production Assistant: Giuseppe Mele, Luca Brunetti
- Casting Director: Francesco Anastasi
- Still Photographer: Alice Camandona
- D.O.P: Valentina Belli
- Editor: Giulio Tiberti
- Make Up Artist: Martina Camandona, Beatrice Contino
- Costume Designer/ Set Decorator: Silvia Segoloni
- Assistant Director: Alice Camandona
- FX: Luca Della Grotta
- Sound Designer: Valerio Moscatelli

== Chart performance ==
On 28 January 2012, it was announced that the album had achieved number 15 on the Billboard 200 in its debut week, with first week sales of 20,000, therefore becoming Lacuna Coil's highest charting album in the United States with Shallow Life achieving 16 on the Billboard 200 in 2009. The album also charted on four other US charts reaching number 2 on the Alternative Albums chart and the Hard Rock Albums Chart, number 3 on the Independent Albums chart and number 5 on the Rock Albums Chart in the same country. Dark Adrenaline charted at number 48 on the UK Albums Chart despite being removed from this chart in its second week after release. The album also charted at number 4 on the UK Rock Chart and in many other countries across Europe, including some of the band's highest chart positions such as number 34 in Finland on the Finnish Albums Chart. The album became the 45th best selling Hard Rock album of 2012 in the United States.

Chart (2012)	Peak position
Belgian Ultratop (Wallonia)	59
Belgian Ultratop (Flanders)	70
Canadian Albums Chart	46
Canadian Hard Rock Albums	3
Dutch Albums Chart	79
Finnish Albums Chart	34
French Albums Chart	53
German Albums Chart	36
Italian Albums Chart	18
Japanese Albums Chart	225
Norwegian Albums Chart	82
Spanish Albums Chart	77
Swiss Albums Chart	53
UK Albums Chart	48
UK Rock Chart	4
US Billboard 200	15
US Alternative Albums	2
US Rock Albums	5
US Hard Rock Albums	2
US Independent Albums	3

=== Year-end charts ===
Chart (2012)	Position
US Hard Rock Albums	45

== Editions ==
- Regular Edition: The regular edition of the album, featuring the 12 tracks above.
- Regular Edition (Limited Edition): The regular edition of the album, containing different artwork made by the band.
- Regular Edition + LP: The regular album + LP
- Digipack Edition: The regular 12 songs + a DVD, guitar pick, and Dark Adrenaline poster, packaged in a digipack.
- Boxset Edition: Limited EU box containing the Deluxe CD/DVD edition, housed in a digipak with reverse side print on the cardstock and partial glossy varnish, a 2012/13 Lacuna Coil calendar and a three button set in plastic pouch.
- Darkest Adrenaline Super Deluxe Box Set Edition: Limited to 500 copies. Contains a vinyl, digipak, hardcover photo book (40 pages), poster, sticker, guitar pick, autographed lithographs, ink vials, syringe pen packaged in a metal medic box.
- iTunes Edition: The regular 12 tracks + the following bonus material: 'Soul Inmate', 'Closer' (live on WCC), 'Heavens A Lie' (live on WCC), 'Within Me' (live on WCC), 'I Won’t Tell You' (live on KXFX), 'Spellbound' (on WBYR Second Visit), 'Trip The Darkness' (video).
- Hastings Edition: Limited to 3000 copies. The regular 12 tracks + the following bonus material on a bonus CD: 'Our Truth' (Taken from Karmacode), Spellbound (Taken from Shallow Life), Heaven's a Lie (Taken from Comalies), When a Dead Man Walks (Taken from Unleashed Memories), Falling Again (Taken from In a Reverie), Reverie (Taken from In a Reverie), Distant Sun (Taken from Unleashed Memories), Self-Deception (Taken from Comalies), In Visible Light (Taken from Karmacode), Swamped (Taken from Comalies). Also contained a coupon for $5 off any CD from Lacuna Coil's Catalog at Hastings locations.

== Personnel ==
Credits for Dark Adrenaline adapted from Barnes & Noble. and from AllMusic

- Andrea Ferro – vocals (male)
- Cristina Scabbia – vocals (female)
- Marco Biazzi – lead guitar
- Cristiano Migliore – rhythm guitar
- Marco Coti Zelati – bass, keyboards
- Cristiano Mozzati – drums, percussion
  - With: Mario Riso – guest percussion

Technical

- Don Gilmore – composition, production
- Lacuna Coil – composition
- Marco Barusso – mixing
- Mark Kiczula – recording engineering
- Marco D'Agostino – mastering
- Adam "Doom" Sewell – management
- Mark "Gus" Guy – tour management
- Tim Borror – booking
- Paul Ryan – booking
- Michael Toorock – legal advising
