= The Abyss (Yourcenar novel) =

1968 novel by Marguerite Yourcenar

- Author: Marguerite Yourcenar
- Original title: L'Œuvre au noir (The Black Work)
- Translator: Grace Frick
- Language: French
- Publication date: 1968
- Publication place: France

The Abyss (French: L'Œuvre au noir) is a 1968 novel by the Belgian-French writer Marguerite Yourcenar. Its narrative centers on the life of Zeno, a physician, philosopher, scientist and alchemist born in Bruges during the Renaissance era. The book was published in France in 1968 and was met with immediate popular interest as well as critical acclaim, obtaining the Prix Femina with unanimous votes the year of its publication. The English translation by Grace Frick has been published under the title The Abyss or alternatively Zeno of Bruges. Belgian filmmaker André Delvaux adapted it into a film in 1988.

== Plot ==
Zeno, an illegitimate son, is adopted by the Ligre household, a rich banking family of Bruges. Zeno renounces a comfortable career in the priesthood and leaves home to find truth at the age of 20. In his youth, after leaving Bruges, he greedily seeks knowledge by roaming the roads of Europe and beyond, leaving in his wake a nearly legendary — but also dangerous — reputation of genius due to his scientific accomplishments — as well as the ire of the Christian authorities for his atheistic attitudes.

Zeno's travels take him from his native Bruges as far away as the court of Gustav Vasa, whose ill-fated son Erik he tutors and attempts to admonish, to the Louvre of Queen Catherine where he encounters the poisoner Cosimo Ruggeri, and also to the lands of the Ottoman Empire, for whose navy he designs a rudimentary flamethrower.

Meanwhile, Zeno's mother Hilzonda becomes involved with the Anabaptist movement and is witness to the Münster rebellion and its suppression by forces under Bishop Waldeck. She dies in Münster.

Zeno's cousin, Henry Maximillian, follows a different path. As a young man, he volunteers into the armies of the Kingdom of France and seeks a romantic life of adventure. He passes a lifetime as a soldier and survives many engagements including the fearsome Battle of Ceresole, during which he is felled by an arquebus bullet and very nearly dies. He later describes to Zeno the "black hole" he glimpsed at Ceresole before he was revived. Years later, Henry Maximillian is killed suddenly in an ambush by the Imperial army during the Siege of Siena. His book of poetry is buried with him in a shallow grave, and he leaves behind only an inscription carved into the rim of the Fontebranda in honor of the aristocratic Signora Piccolomini who he loved.

Eventually returning to Bruges under an assumed name, Zeno confides only in his friend and fellow atheist Jan Myers. When his young assistant Cyprian is caught in an illicit Adamite cult, Zeno's true identity is exposed and he is condemned to be burned at the stake for, among other things, the crime of atheism. Before he can be burned, Zeno kills himself in prison by severing his veins with a smuggled razor.

== Themes ==
The novel is set principally in Flanders of the 16th century, in the period opening the Early modern era of booming capitalistic economy, of renewed approaches to sciences, of religious upheavals and the bloody counter-Reformation, to the background of incessant wars between countries and the creeping chaos of the Black Death. In this setting, Zeno, the main character, is portrayed as a Renaissance Man of great intelligence and talent whose freedom of thoughts will come to be tested by the confines of his time.

== Title ==
The French title L'Oeuvre au noir refers to the first step (nigredo) of the three steps the completion of which is required to achieve the Magnum opus in the discipline of alchemy, whose ultimate goal is to transmute lesser metals into gold or to create the Philosopher's stone.

In Yourcenar's own words, "In alchemical treatises, the formula L'Oeuvre au Noir, designates what is said to be the most difficult phase of the alchemist's process, the separation and dissolution of substance. It is still not clear whether the term applied to daring experiments on matter itself, or whether it was understood to symbolize trials of the mind in discarding all forms of routine and prejudice. Doubtless it signified one or the other meaning alternately, or perhaps both at the same time."

The English title The Abyss gives a slightly different lead by the evocation of fathomless depths, a likely image of the alchemist's inner journey, which are at the same time a Christian vision of hell, to which his contemporaries may wish to condemn him.

== See also ==
- Illegitimacy in fiction
- Le Monde's 100 Books of the Century
