= Oriental Tales =

Book by Marguerite Yourcenar

- Title page for Nouvelles orientales (1938)
- Author: Marguerite Yourcenar
- Original title: Nouvelles orientales
- Translator: Alberto Manguel
- Language: French
- Publisher: Éditions Gallimard
- Publication date: 1938
- Publication place: France
- English publication date: 1985
- Pages: 172

Oriental Tales (French: Nouvelles orientales) is a 1938 short story collection by the Belgian writer Marguerite Yourcenar. The stories share a self-consciously mythological form; some are based on pre-existing myths and legends, while some are new. The story "How Wang-Fo Was Saved" was adapted into an animated short film by René Laloux in the 1980s.

== Contents ==
- "How Wang-Fô Was Saved"
- "Marko's Smile"
- "The Milk of Death"
- "The Last Love of Prince Genji"
- "The Man Who Loved the Nereids"
- "Our Lady-of-the-Swallows"
- "Aphrodissia, the Widow"
- "Kali Beheaded"
- "The End of Marko Kraljevic"
- "The Sadness of Cornelius Berg"

== Publication history ==
Éditions Gallimard published the book in 1938. It was published in English in 1985 through Farrar, Straus & Giroux, in translation by Alberto Manguel in collaboration with the author.

== Reception ==
Susan Slocum Hinerfeld of Los Angeles Times called the book "a curiosity, a melange" and wrote about the stories: "They are meant to demonstrate virtuosity. Instead they demonstrate the dangers of imitation." The critic wrote that "the story of Wang-Fo, though rich in content, is 'faux-chinois', pretend-fantastic, coy. It is plainly a clumsy Western exercise in Chinese story telling", while "'The Man Who Loved the Nereids' is, in contrast, as radiant as Madame Yourcenar's mind. Clever, stylish, funny and original, an homage to Greek myth, it links the ancient and the modern worlds."

== See also ==
- 1938 in literature
- 20th-century French literature
