= Memoirs of Hadrian =

1951 historical novel by Marguerite Yourcenar

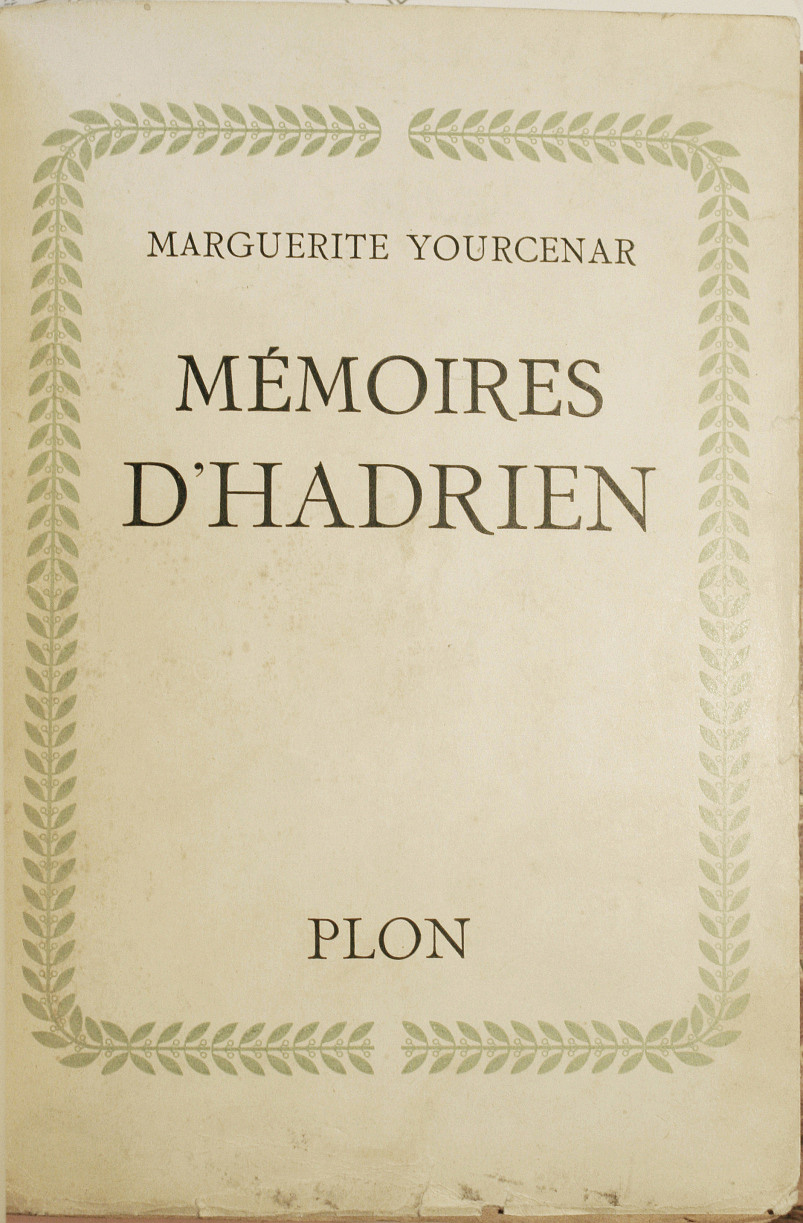
- Cover of the first French edition
- Author: Marguerite Yourcenar
- Language: French
- Genre: Historical novel, philosophical novel
- Publisher: Librairie Plon, France
- Publication date: 1951
- Publication place: France
- Media type: Print (hardback & paperback)
- Pages: 347 pp (2005 paperback)

Memoirs of Hadrian (French: Mémoires d'Hadrien) is a French-language novel by the Belgian-born French writer Marguerite Yourcenar about the life and death of the Roman Emperor Hadrian. First published in France in 1951, the book was a critical and commercial success. It was translated into English by Grace Frick and published as Hadrian's Memoirs in 1954 by Farrar, Straus and Young and the following year in the UK as Memoirs of Hadrian (by Secker & Warburg). American editions of this translation are now published under the latter title.

The book takes the form of a letter to Hadrian's adoptive grandson and eventual successor "Mark" (Marcus Aurelius). The emperor meditates on military triumphs, love of poetry and music, philosophy, and his passion for his lover Antinous, all in a manner similar to Gustave Flaubert's "melancholy of the antique world."

Yourcenar noted in her postscript "Carnet de note" to the original edition, quoting Flaubert, that she had chosen Hadrian as the subject of the novel in part because he had lived at a time when the Roman gods were no longer believed in, but Christianity was not yet established. This intrigued her for what she saw as parallels to her own post-war European world. Although the historical Hadrian wrote an autobiography, it has been lost.

In 2019, Memoirs of Hadrian was in Le Temps voted the sixth best book written in French in the 20th and 21st century by a jury of 50 literary connoisseurs.

== Writing of the novel ==
Yourcenar first thought of the idea for the book between 1924 and 1929. She then worked on various drafts intermittently between 1934 and 1937. The notion of writing the book from the point of view of a dying Hadrian occurred to her after reading a sentence in a draft from 1937 stating: "I begin to discern the profile of my death."

She did not resume work on the book in earnest until December 1948, as she lived between New York and Hartford, Connecticut. She states that while she based her account of Hadrian on the two most principal sources, Historia Augusta and Cassius Dio's Historia Romana, her goal was to reinterpret the past but also strive for historical authenticity.

== Synopsis ==
The novel is told in the first person by Hadrian and is framed as a letter to Marcus Aurelius in the first chapter, Animula Vagula Blandula. The other chapters form a loose chronological narrative which he often breaks with various insights and recollections. The story begins with Hadrian, who is around sixty years of age, describing his incurable illness. He therefore wishes to recount important events in his life before his death.

His earliest memories are his boyhood years in Italica. He also talks of his early interest in astrology and his lifelong passion for the arts, culture, and philosophy of Greece; themes which he revisits throughout the book. He visits Athens to study, travels to Rome for the first time, and witnesses the accession of Trajan. He eventually joins the army and participates in the Dacian campaign. Hadrian, who is around thirty years old at the end of the war, describes his successes in the army and his relationship with Trajan who is initially cold towards him. He slowly gains Trajan's favor and secures his position for the throne with the help of Plotina, the emperor's wife, and also by marrying Sabina, Trajan's grandniece.

During his military service, the outcome of the Sarmatian wars strongly affects him due to the appalling bloodshed and atrocities committed. He also begins to question the value of Trajan's policy of military expansion. Trajan, in old age, begins an unsuccessful military campaign in Parthia after his successes over Dacia and Sarmatia. After a major defeat, Trajan hastily names Hadrian as his successor in a will shortly before his death. Following the death of Trajan, he hesitantly has his rivals executed and makes peace with Parthia. He travels frequently throughout the provinces of the Roman Empire while undertaking numerous economic and military reforms, promoting in his words: "humanitas, libertas, felicitas". During a visit to Britain, he describes the construction of Hadrian's Wall, which represents part of his vision of curbing the military expansion of his predecessor and promoting peace.

Hadrian's administration is a time of peace and happiness which he regards as his "Age of Gold." He attributes this happiness to his love for Antinous, a beautiful Bithynian youth he meets in Nicomedia. He also feels genuinely loved by Antinous compared to the fleeting passions of his youth and the loveless relationship with his wife Sabina. While visiting Egypt, he despairs over the sudden and mysterious death of Antinous who drowns in the Nile. He ultimately believes that Antinous sacrificed himself in order to alter the outcome of troubling portents that both had witnessed earlier. In his grief, he devises the cult of Antinous and makes future plans to dedicate a new city to him in an effort to eternalize his memory.

Hadrian begins reflecting upon his advancing age and his change in temperament, recalling one incident where he accidentally blinds his secretary out of rage. Further troubling him is the outbreak of rebellion in Judea, which forces him to travel and take command of the troops. During an important siege, he despairs over the unraveling of his plans for peace, his ailing heart condition, and later over the rampant destruction in Judea. He states, "Natura deficit, fortuna mutatur, deus omnia cernit. Nature fails us, fortune changes, a god beholds all things from on high…"

During his final years in Rome and at his villa in Tibur, he ponders his succession and his thoughts turn to a memory of Marcus Aurelius as a virtuous and kind-hearted boy. Hadrian, now in advanced age and very poor health, begins to fear death and contemplates suicide through various means. He finally accepts his fate with resignation, or patientia, while reflecting on his newfound divine status throughout the Empire. Near death, he contemplates what the future may hold for the world, Rome, and for his soul.
