= Fyre =

Fyre may refer to:

== Arts, entertainment, and media ==
- Fyre Festival, a fraudulent, widely criticized music concert on the Bahamian island of Great Exuma
  - Fyre Fraud, a 2019 Hulu documentary about the Fyre Festival
  - Fyre (film), a 2019 Netflix documentary film about the Fyre Festival
- Fyre (novel), a fantasy novel in the Septimus Heap series by Angie Sage
- Fyre (software), a digital tool for producing artwork

== People ==
- Fyre, or Teri Byrne (born 1972), a wrestling personality also known as Fyre
- Young Fyre, or Tramaine Winfrey (born 1986), an American record producer

== See also ==
- Fire (disambiguation)
- Fyr (disambiguation)
- Frye Festival, an annual literary festival in Moncton, New Brunswick, Canada
- On Fyre, 1984 album by the American garage rock band Lyres
