= Fyr =

Fyr or FYR may refer to:

- Former Yugoslav Republic of Macedonia (now North Macedonia)
- Fyr Channel, an Antarctic strait in the South Orkney Islands
- "FYR", a 2001 song on Feminist Sweepstakes by Le Tigre
- FYR, an email subject abbreviation for 'For your reference'

== See also ==
- Fyre (disambiguation)
- FRY (disambiguation)
