= Grace Frick =

American English professor, translator, and researcher

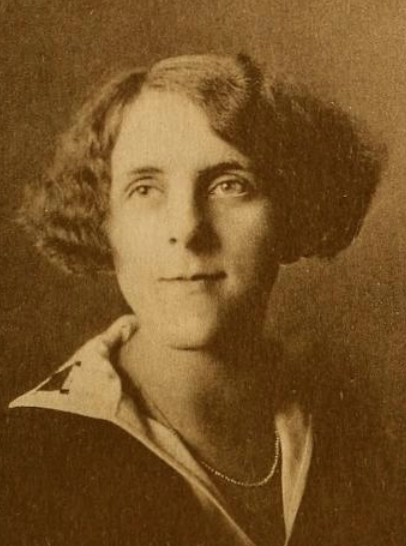
- Frick from the 1925 Wellesley yearbook
- Born: Grace Marion Frick; January 12, 1903; Toledo, Ohio
- Died: November 18, 1979 (aged 76); Northeast Harbor, Maine, U.S.
- Occupations: College administrator, educator, translator
- Partner: Marguerite Yourcenar

Academic background
- Education: Wellesley College; Yale University; University of Kansas

Academic work
- Discipline: English
- Institutions: Stephens College; Barnard College; Hartford College for Women

Grace Marion Frick (January 12, 1903 – November 18, 1979) was an American translator and researcher for her lifelong partner, Belgian-French writer Marguerite Yourcenar. Grace Frick taught languages at US colleges and was the second academic dean to be appointed to Hartford Junior College.

== Early life ==
Grace Marion Frick was born in Toledo, Ohio, on January 12, 1903. The family later moved to Kansas City, Missouri.

Frick attended Wellesley College, receiving her bachelor's in 1925 and in 1927 earning a master's degree in English.

While at Wellesley College, she worked as a graduate assistant in the English Department where she took on different academic duties to include coediting the first alumnae bulletin, titled the Chat Cat, for her graduating class of 1927. She worked on a dissertation at Yale University, starting in 1937, the same year she met Yourcenar in Paris, and completed academic work at University of Kansas.

== Career ==
Frick is most remembered for being the translator from French into English of Memoirs of Hadrian, The Abyss and Coup de Grâce by Marguerite Yourcenar. Until Frick's death, Yourcenar allowed only her to translate her books.

She taught at Stephens Junior College for Women (now Stephens College), Columbia, Missouri, and at Barnard College, New York City. After Yourcenar's arrival, in 1940, Frick became the second academic dean of Hartford Junior College (later Hartford College for Women), until 1943, and they moved together at 549 Prospect Ave, West Hartford. Other than administrative duties, Frick also taught English. After Hartford, Frick taught at Connecticut College for Women (now Connecticut College), New London, Connecticut.

While in Hartford, Frick and Yourcenar were active in the arts community that originated around the Wadsworth Atheneum headed by Arthur Everett Austin, Jr.

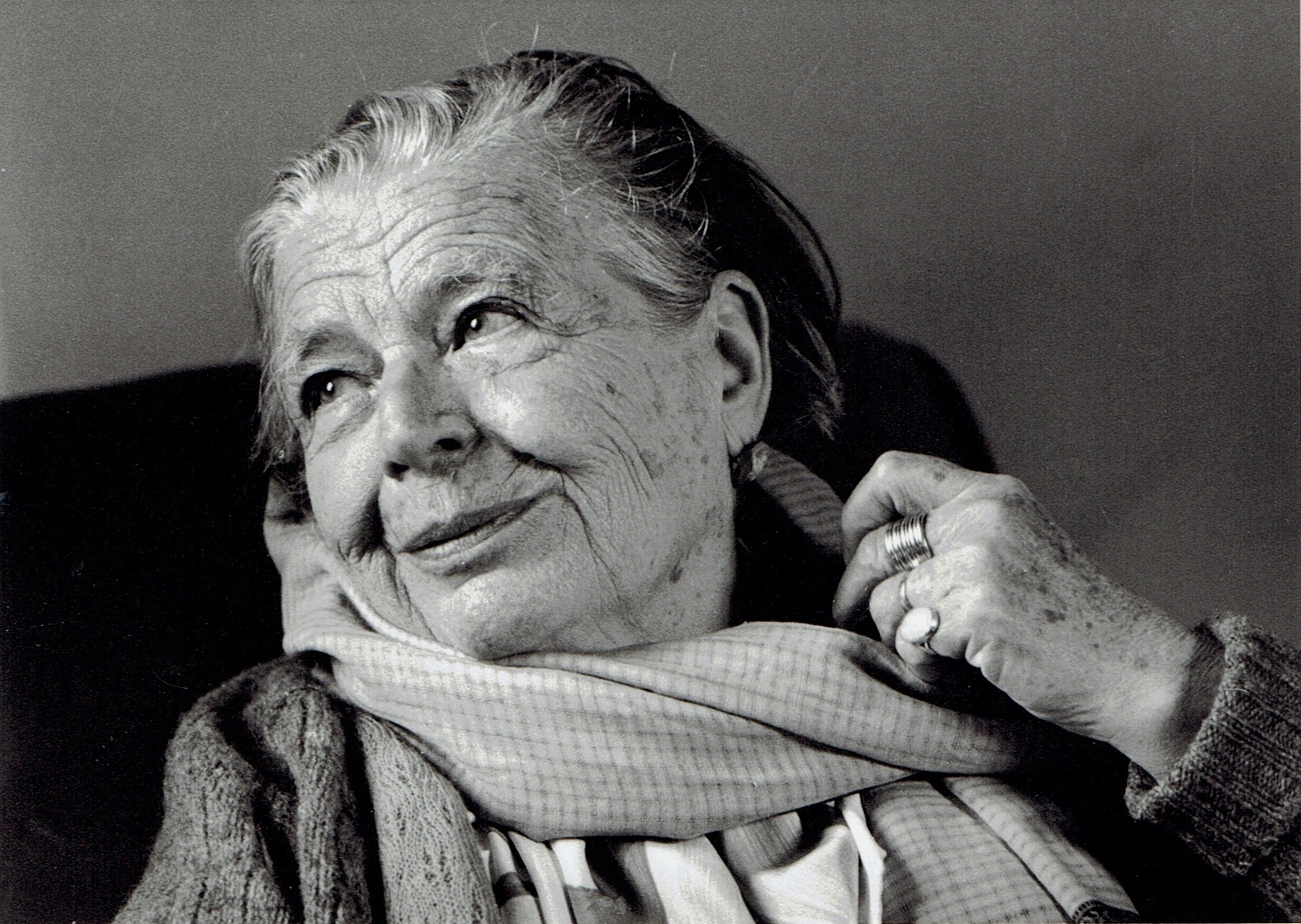
French writer Marguerite Yourcenar, her companion, in 1982.

== Personal life ==
She met Marguerite Yourcenar in February 1937 at the Wagram Hotel, Paris. They fell madly in love with one another and, in 1939, Grace invited Marguerite to come live with her in the United States, allowing the latter to escape the imminent war in Europe.

Together they bought a house, "Petite Plaisance", in 1950 in Northeast Harbor, Maine, on Mount Desert Island. The two spoke French at home, loved horseback riding and lived a quiet life. Frick and Yourcenar lived together for forty years until Frick died of cancer on November 18, 1979, at "Petite Plaisance".

They are both buried at Brookside Cemetery, Mount Desert, Maine. Alongside them is a memorial plaque for Jerry Wilson, the last companion of Yourcenar, who died of AIDS in 1986.
