= Fire (Australian band) =

1980s Australian rock band

- Also known as: Ku Klux Frankenstein, the Klutzo's
- Origin: Melbourne, Australia
- Genres: Gothic rock, acid rock
- Years active: 1983–1987
- Labels: Crash, Cleopatra
- Past members: Lindsay Brunsdon (p.k.a. Lindsay Storm); Andrew Flossos (p.k.a. Andrew Frank); Kerrie Hickin (p.k.a. Kerrie Van Lewin); Neil D Schneider (p.k.a. Neild Stein); Rodney Kuna

Fire were an Australian gothic, acid rock band, which formed in 1983 as Ku Klux Frankenstein. Founders were Lindsay Brunsdon (p.k.a. Lindsay Storm) on guitar and vocals, Andrew Flossos (p.k.a. Andrew Frank) on drums, Kerrie Hickin (p.k.a. Kerrie Van Lewin) on bass guitar and Neil D Schneider (p.k.a. Neild Stein) on vocals and saxophone. They issued an extended play, Love for Sale (1985) and changed their name in 1986. Fire's sole studio album, A Frame of Purple Roses, was released in early 1987 and the group disbanded at the end of that year.

== 1983–1986: Ku Klux Frankenstein ==
Fire were formed as Ku Klux Frankenstein in inner Melbourne as a gothic, acid rock band by Lindsay Brunsdon (p.k.a. Lindsay Storm) on guitar and vocals (ex-Hear Hear), Andrew Flossos (p.k.a. Andrew Frank) on drums, Kerrie Hickin (p.k.a. Kerrie Van Lewin) on bass guitar (ex-Lynching Party) and Neil D Schneider (p.k.a. Neild Stein) on vocals and saxophone.

Australian musicologist Ian McFarlane described their performances as both "inspirational and wildly erratic" with their sound based on "Brunsdon's abrasive acid-rock guitar fireworks and [Schneider]'s gravel-pit vocals overlaid with a sinister Gothic atmosphere." Ku Klux Frankenstein recorded a demo, "Baby You Light Up My Cigarette", for radio station 3PBS and followed with a four-track extended play, Love for Sale, which was issued on Crash in 1985. McFarlane observed, "slop-bucket production values and a murky sound that did little to entice" a new audience. The title track was co-written by Brundson, Flossos, Hickin and Schneider. In an attempt to perform beyond their inner city centre the group changed their name to Fire in 1986.

== 1986–1987: A Frame of Purple Roses ==
Fire recorded their debut album, A Frame of Purple Roses, with Kaj Dahlstrom and Trevor Reading producing. It was released in early 1987 on Cleopatra. McFarlane felt their tracks, "Lion of Love" and "Make It Through the Night", demonstrated "a band with the strength of its convictions". Tharunka's reviewer observed, "Its wild and must be one of the most exotic records floating around at the moment. You certainly can't categorise them as their playing varies from soft moving vocals for the raunchiest thrash..." Hickin was replaced on bass guitar by Rodney Kuna but the group disbanded at the end of that year.

Brundson successively joined the Wet Ones, Dirty Strangers and Charles Marshall and the Body Electric; Hickin was a member of the Sunset Strip, Autohaze and Holocene; Schneider became an actor and Flossos resumed his medical degree.

== Members ==
- Lindsay Brunsdon (p.k.a. Lindsay Storm) – guitar, vocals, piano
- Andrew Flossos (p.k.a. Andrew Frank) – drums
- Kerrie Hickin (p.k.a. Kerrie Van Lewin) – bass guitar, trumpet
- Neil D Schneider (p.k.a. Neild Stein) – vocals, saxophone
- Rodney Kuna – bass guitar

== Discography ==
=== Albums ===
- A Frame of Purple Roses (1987) – Cleopatra (CSP217)

=== Extended plays ===
- Love for Sale (by Ku Klux Frankenstein) – Crash (CSH 1201)
