= Firing squad (disambiguation) =

Execution by firing squad is a method of capital punishment.

Firing squad may also refer to:

- Firing Squad (album), a 1996 album by M.O.P.
- Firing Squad (film) a 1990 Canadian television film based on the 1958 novel Execution
- The Firing Squad (1999 film), an American film
- The Firing Squad (2024 film), an American film
- "Firing Squad", a 2015 song by Lifehouse from the album Out of the Wasteland

== See also ==
- Firing squad synchronization problem, a problem in computer science first proposed in 1957
