= Marguerite Yourcenar =

French novelist and essayist (1903–1987)

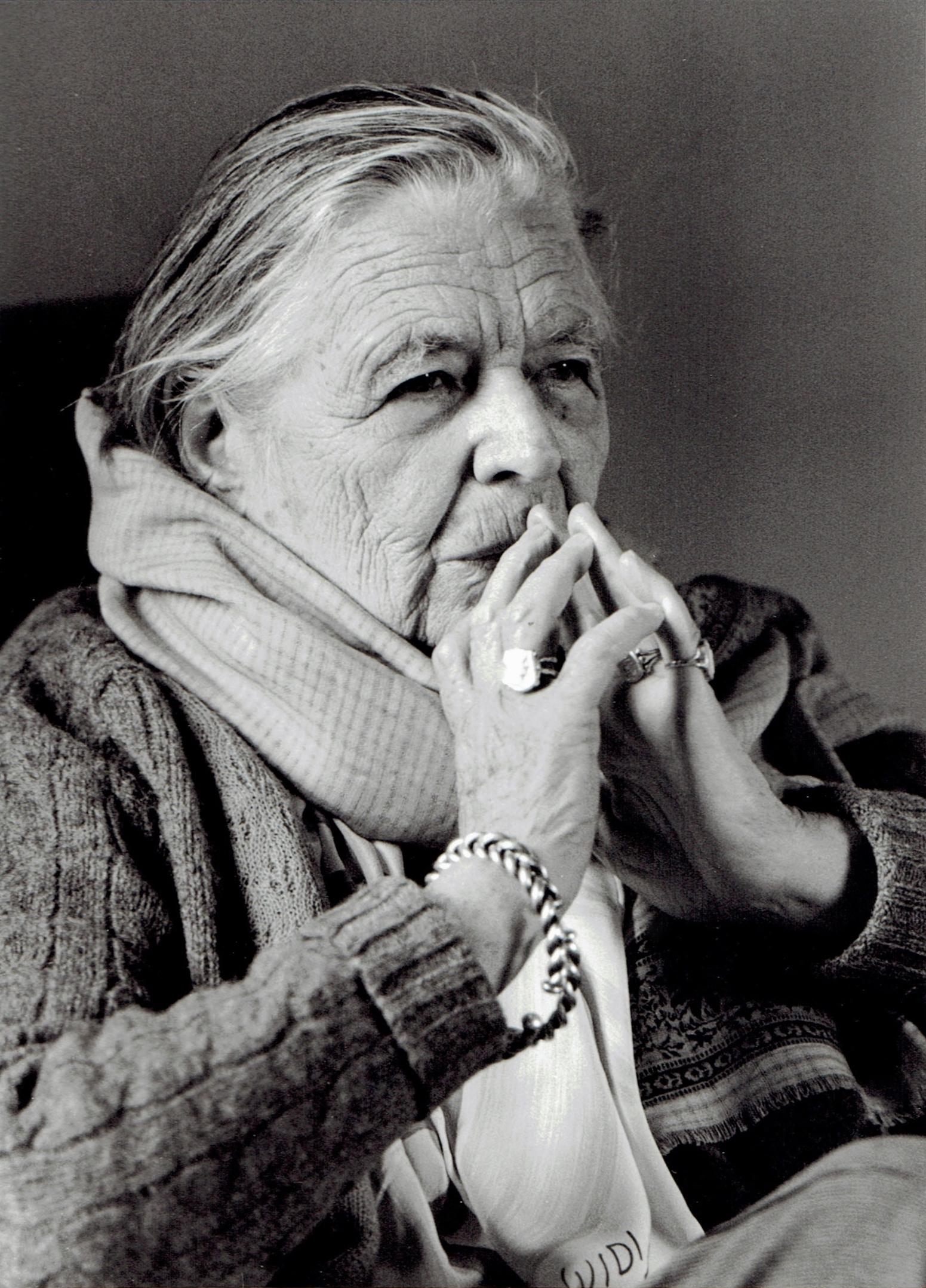
- Yourcenar in 1982
- Born: Marguerite Antoinette Jeanne Marie Ghislaine Cleenewerck de Crayencour; 8 June 1903; Brussels, Belgium
- Died: 17 December 1987 (aged 84); Bar Harbor, Maine, US
- Occupations: Novelist; essayist; poet
- Partners: Grace Frick (1937–1979; Frick's death)
- Writing career
- Notable work: Mémoires d'Hadrien
- Notable awards: Académie Française (1980); Erasmus Prize (1983)

Marguerite Yourcenar (UK: /ˈjʊərsənɑːr, ˈjʊkənɑːr/, US: /ˌjʊərsəˈnɑːr/; French: [maʁɡ(ə)ʁit juʁsənaʁ]; born Marguerite Antoinette Jeanne Marie Ghislaine Cleenewerck de Crayencour; 8 June 1903 – December 1987) was a Belgian-born French novelist and essayist who became a US citizen in 1947. Winner of the Prix Femina and the Erasmus Prize, she was the first woman elected to the Académie Française, in 1980. In 1965, she was nominated for the Nobel Prize in Literature.

== Biography ==
Yourcenar was born in Brussels, Belgium, as Marguerite Antoinette Jeanne Marie Ghislaine Cleenewerck de Crayencour, to Michel Cleenewerck de Crayencour and Fernande de Cartier de Marchienne. Her father was of French bourgeois descent, originating from French Flanders, and a wealthy landowner. Her mother, of Belgian nobility, died ten days after Marguerite's birth. She grew up in the home of her paternal grandmother, and adopted the surname Yourcenar as a pen name; in 1947, she also took it as her legal surname.

Yourcenar's first novel, Alexis, was published in 1929. She translated Virginia Woolf's The Waves over a ten-month period in 1937. In 1939, her partner at the time, the literary scholar and Kansas City native Grace Frick, invited Yourcenar to the United States to escape the outbreak of World War II in Europe. She lectured in comparative literature in New York City and Sarah Lawrence College.

Yourcenar and Frick became lovers in 1937 and remained together until Frick's death in 1979. After ten years spent in Hartford, Connecticut, they bought a house in Northeast Harbor, Maine, on Mount Desert Island, where they lived for decades. They are buried next to each other at Brookside Cemetery, Somesville, Mount Desert, Maine. Yourcenar's last companion was Jerry Wilson, with whom she had a tormented relationship; he died of AIDS in 1986.

In 1951, Yourcenar published, in France, the novel Memoirs of Hadrian, which she had been writing on and off for a decade. The novel was an immediate success and met with critical acclaim. In this novel, Yourcenar recreated the life and death of one of the great rulers of the ancient world, the Roman emperor Hadrian, who writes a long letter to Marcus Aurelius, the son and heir of Antoninus Pius, his successor and adoptive son. Hadrian meditates on his past, describing both his triumphs and his failures, his love for Antinous, and his philosophy. The novel has become a modern classic. The English version was translated by Frick.

In 1980, Yourcenar became the first female member elected to the Académie française. An anecdote tells of how the bathroom labels were then changed in this male-dominated institution: "Messieurs|Marguerite Yourcenar" (Gents/Marguerite Yourcenar). She published many novels, essays, and poems, as well as a trilogy of memoirs. At the time of her death, she was working on the third volume, titled Quoi? L'Eternité.

Yourcenar's house on Mount Desert Island, Petite Plaisance, is now a museum dedicated to her memory. She is buried across the sound in Somesville.

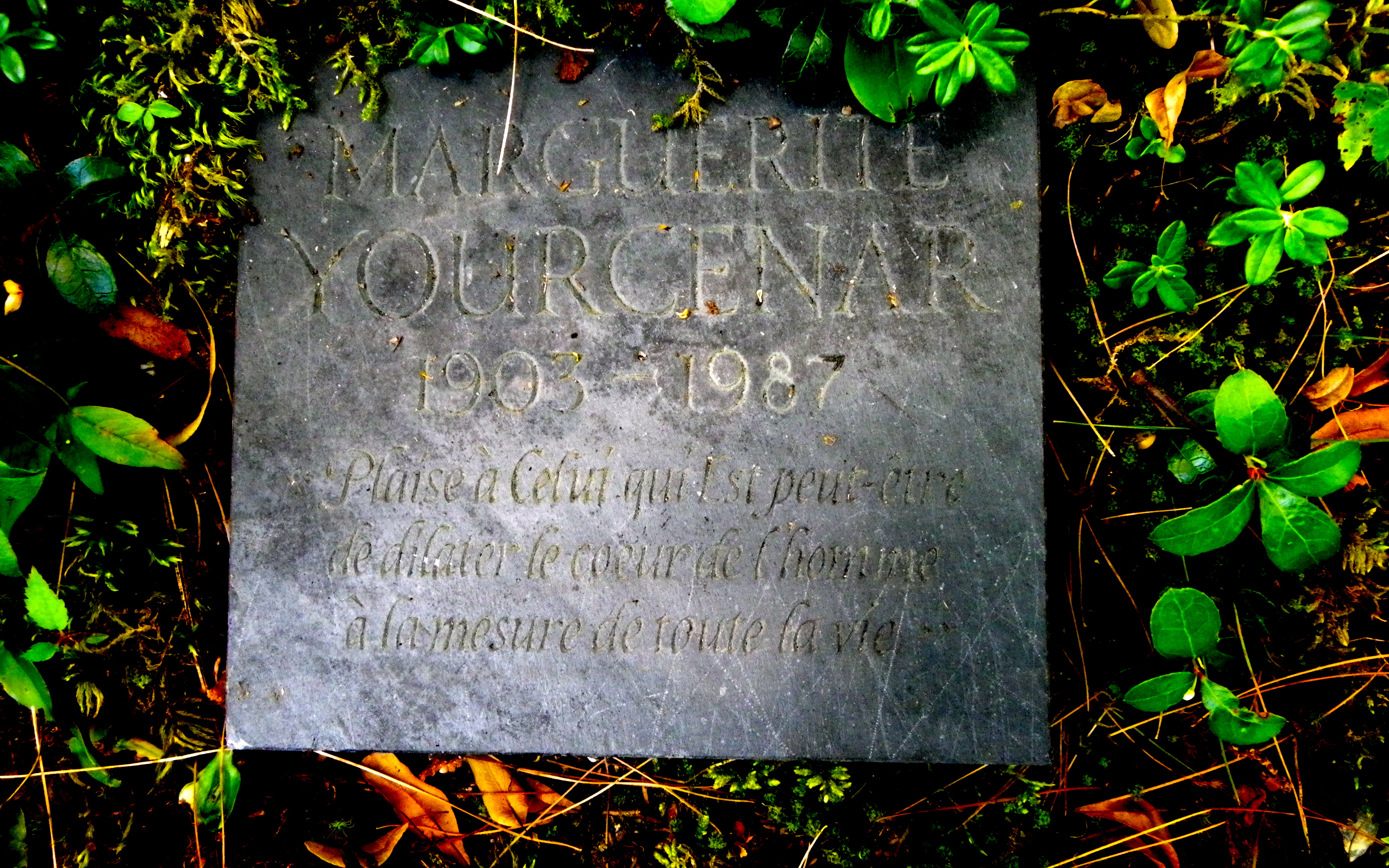
Marguerite Yourcenar's funeral plate. The epitaph, written in French, is from The Abyss: «Plaise à Celui qui Est peut-être de dilater le cœur de l'homme à la mesure de toute la vie.», which can be translated to "May it please the One who is perchance to expand the human heart to life's full measure."

== Legacy and honours ==
- 1952: Prix Femina Vacaresco for Mémoires d'Hadrien (Memoirs of Hadrian)
- 1958: Prix Renée Vivien for Les charités d'Alcippe (The Alms of Alcippe)
- 1963: Prix Combat for Sous bénéfice d'inventaire (The Dark Brain of Piranesi)
- 1968: Prix Femina for L'Œuvre au noir (The Abyss)
- 1972: Prix Prince Pierre de Monaco for her entire oeuvre
- 1974: Grand Prix national de la culture for Souvenirs pieux (Dear Departed)
- 1977: Grand Prix de l'Académie française for her entire oeuvre
- 1980: elected to the Académie française, the first woman so honored
- 1983: winner of the Erasmus Prize for contributions to European literature and culture
- 1987: Fellow of the American Academy of Arts and Sciences
- 2003: 12 November: Belgium issues a postage stamp (Code 200320B) with the value of 0.59 Euro
- 2020: Google celebrated her 117th birthday with a Google Doodle

== Bibliography ==
- Le jardin des chimères (1921)
- Les dieux ne sont pas morts (1922)
- Alexis ou le traité du vain combat (1929) – translated as Alexis by Walter Kaiser; ISBN 0-374-51906-4
- La nouvelle Eurydice (1931)
- Pindare (1932)
- Denier du rêve (1934, revised 1958–59) – translated as A Coin in Nine Hands by Dori Katz; ISBN 0-552-99120-1
- La mort conduit l'attelage (1934)
- Feux (prose poem, 1936) – translated as Fires by Dori Katz; ISBN 0-374-51748-7
- Nouvelles orientales (short stories, 1938) – translated as Oriental Tales; ISBN 1-85290-018-0 (includes "Comment Wang-Fô fut sauvé", first published 1936, filmed by René Laloux)
- Les songes et les sorts (1938) – translated as Dreams and Destinies by Donald Flanell Friedman
- Le coup de grâce (1939) – translated as Coup de Grace by Grace Frick; ISBN 0-374-51631-6
- Mémoires d'Hadrien (1951) – translated as Memoirs of Hadrian by Grace Frick; ISBN 0-14-018194-6
- Électre ou la chute des masques (1954)
- Les charités d'Alcippe (1956)
- Constantin Cavafy (1958)
- Sous bénéfice d'inventaire (1962)
- Fleuve profond, sombre rivière: les negros spirituals (1964)
- L'Œuvre au noir (novel, 1968, Prix Femina 1968) – translated as The Abyss, or Zeno of Bruges by Grace Frick (1976)
- Théâtre, 1971
- Souvenirs pieux (1974) – translated as Dear Departed: A Memoir by Maria Louise Ascher; ISBN 0-374-52367-3
- Archives du Nord (1977) – translated as How Many Years: A Memoir by Maria Louise Ascher
- Le labyrinthe du monde (1974–84)
- Mishima ou la vision du vide (essay, 1980) – translated as Mishima: A Vision of the Void; ISBN 0-226-96532-5
- Anna, soror... (1981)
- Comme l'eau qui coule (1982) translated as Two Lives and a Dream. Includes "Anna, Soror...", "An Obscure Man", and "A Lovely Morning".
- Le temps, ce grand sculpteur (1984) – translated as That Mighty Sculptor, Time by Walter Kaiser, essays: ISBN 0-85628-159-X
- The Dark Brain of Piranesi and Other Essays (1984) – translated by Richard Howard; ISBN 0-856-28140-9
- "La Couronne et la Lyre." Χατζηνικολής editions (1986)
- Quoi? L'Éternité (1988)

Correspondence

- Lettres à ses amis et quelques autres, Édition de Joseph Brami et de Michèle Sarde avec la collaboration d’Élyane Dezon-Jones, Paris, Gallimard, 1995, 736 p. ISBN 2070738574.
- D’Hadrien à Zénon, Correspondance 1951-1956 de Marguerite Yourcenar. Texte établi et annoté par Colette Gaudin et Rémy Poignault avec la collaboration de Joseph Brami et Maurice Delcroix; édition coordonnée par Élyane Dezon-Jones et Michèle Sarde; préface de Josyane Savigneau, Paris, Gallimard, 2004, 640 p., ISBN 207075684X.
- « Une volonté sans fléchissement ». Correspondance 1957-1960, texte établi, annoté et préfacé par Joseph Brami, Maurice Delcroix, édition coordonnée par Colette Gaudin et Rémy Poignault avec la collaboration de Michèle Sarde, Paris, Gallimard, 2007, 549 p.
- Marguerite Yourcenar, Silvia Baron Supervielle, Une reconstitution passionnelle. Correspondance 1980-1987, édition établie, annotée et commentée par Achmy Halley, Avant-propos de Silvia Baron Supervielle, Paris, Gallimard, 2009, 99 p.
- « Persévérer dans l’être ». Correspondance 1961-1963 (D’Hadrien à Zénon, III), texte établi et annoté par Joseph Brami et Rémy Poignault, avec la collaboration de Maurice Delcroix, Colette Gaudin et Michèle Sarde, préface de Joseph Brami et Michèle Sarde, Paris, Gallimard, 2011, 503 p.
- « En 1939, L’Amérique commence à Bordeaux ». Lettres à Emmanuel Boudot-Lamotte (1938-1980), édition établie, présentée et annotée par Élyane DEZON-JONES et Michèle SARDE, Paris, Gallimard, 2016, 304 p.
- « Le pendant des Mémoires d’Hadrien et leur entier contraire ». Correspondance 1964-1967, édition de Bruno Blanckeman et Rémy Poignault, avec préface d’Élyane Dezon-Jones et Michèle Sarde, Paris, Gallimard, coll. “Blanche”, 2019, 640 p.
- «Zénon, sombre Zénon». Correspondance 1968-1970, texte établi et annoté par Joseph Brami et Rémy Poignault, avec la collaboration de Bruno Blanckeman et Colette Gaudin, Paris, Gallimard, coll. “Blanche”, 2023, 927 p.

Other works available in English translation

- A Blue Tale and Other Stories; ISBN 0-226-96530-9. Three stories written between 1927 and 1930, translated and published in 1995.
- With Open Eyes: Conversations with Matthieu Galey

== Sources ==
- Joan E. Howard, From Violence to Vision: Sacrifice in the Works of Marguerite Yourcenar (1992)
- Josyane Savigneau, Marguerite Yourcenar: Inventing a Life (1993).
- George Rousseau, Marguerite Yourcenar: A Biography (London: Haus Publishing, 2004).
- Judith Holland Sarnecki, Subversive Subjects: Reading Marguerite Yourcenar (2004)
- Giorgetto Giorgi, "Il Grand Tour e la scoperta dell’antico nel Labyrinthe du monde di Marguerite Yourcenar," in Sergio Audano, Giovanni Cipriani (ed.), Aspetti della Fortuna dell'Antico nella Cultura Europea: atti della settima giornata di studi, Sestri Levante, 19 March 2010 (Foggia: Edizioni il Castello, 2011) (Echo, 1), 99–108.
- Les yeux ouverts, entretiens avec Mathieu Galey (Éditions du Centurion « Les interviews », 1980).
- Bérengère Deprez, Marguerite Yourcenar et les États-Unis. Du nageur à la vague, Éditions Racine, 2012, 192 p.
- Bérengère Deprez, Marguerite Yourcenar and the United States. From Prophecy to Protest, Peter Lang, coll. « Yourcenar », 2009, 180 p.
- Deprez, Marguerite Yourcenar. Écriture, maternité, démiurgie, essai, Bruxelles, Archives et musée de la littérature/PIE-Peter Lang, coll. « Documents pour l’histoire des francophonies », 2003, 330 p.
- Donata Spadaro, Marguerite Yourcenar et l'écriture autobiographique : Le Labyrinthe du monde, bull. SIEY, no 17, décembre 1996, p. 69 à 83
- Donata Spadaro, Marguerite Yourcenar e l'autobiografia (ADP, 2014)
- Mireille Brémond, Marguerite Yourcenar, une femme à l'Académie (Garnier, 2019);.
- Rémy Poignault, L'Antiquité dans l'œuvre de Marguerite Yourcenar. Littérature, mythe et histoire, Bruxelles, coll. Latomus, 1995.
