= Fiyah =

"Fiyah" may refer to:

- a 2017 song by will.i.am
- FIYAH!!, a 2019 album by Abdu Ali
- FIYAH, a magazine
