= This Fire =

This Fire may refer to:

- This Fire (album), a 1996 album from Paula Cole
- "This Fire" (Franz Ferdinand song), 2004
- This Fire (EP), a 2012 EP by Birds of Tokyo
- "This Fire" (Birds of Tokyo song), 2012
- "This Fire", a song by Killswitch Engage, from the album As Daylight Dies
