= Fiers =

Fiers may refer to:

- Alan Fiers (born 1939), American Central Intelligence Agency official
- Mike Fiers (born 1985), American professional baseball player
- Nadine Fiers (born 1966), Belgian racing cyclist
- Walter Fiers (1931–2019), Belgian molecular biologist
- Gustav Fiers, a Marvel Comics supervillain and enemy of Spider-Man known by the alias "the Gentleman"

== See also ==
- Fier, Albania
- Fires
