= Torch Club =

Historic music venue in California

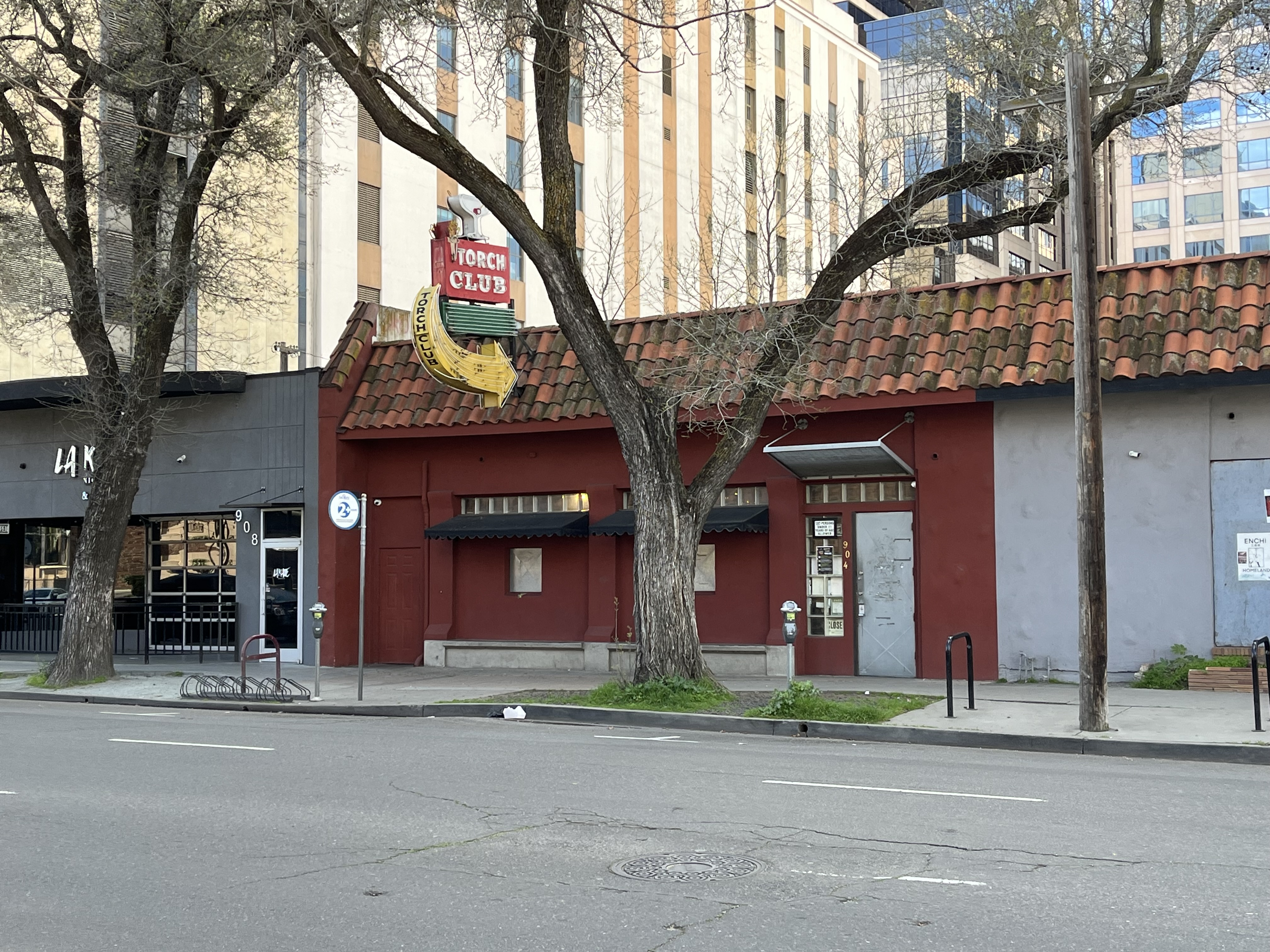
- Interactive map of Torch Club
- Address: 904 15th St. Sacramento, California; United States
- Coordinates: 38°34′45″N 121°29′11″W
- Owner: Mark Mitchell and Marina Texeira

Construction
- Opened: 1934; 92 years ago

The Torch Club is a historic music venue located at 904 15th St. in Sacramento, California. It was established in 1934.

== History ==
The Torch Club opened in 1934. Frank Texeira purchased the venue in 1969. Ron and Evelyn Texeira took ownership upon Frank's death in the 1980s, and finally Marina Texeira took ownership alongside her father in 1996, eventually running it with her partner, Mark Mitchell.

The Torch Club became a blues locale over the years, playing host to acts such as Rusty Zinn, Steve Froind, Aki Kumar, Johnny Lodden, The Lew Fratis Trio, Little Charlie & the Nightcats, Jackie Greene, Brian Auger, Joe Louis Walker, Sista Monica, Jimmy Pailer & the Prophets, Aaron King Trio, Stacie Eakes and the Superfreaks, Mind X, Terry Hanck, Janiva Magness, The Delgado Brothers, Shane Dwight, Volker Strifler, Mark Hummel, Golden State Lone Star Blues Revue, Honey B & the Cultivation, Mick Martin & the Blues Rockers, Daniel Castro, Popa Chubby, and Chris Cain.
