= Fire (Lacuna Coil song) =

Single by Lacuna Coil

from the album Dark Adrenaline
- Released: 15 June 2012
- Recorded: 2011
- Genre: Gothic metal
- Length: 2:55
- Label: Century Media, EMI
- Songwriter(s): Marco Biazzi, Marco Coti Zelati, Andrea Ferro, Don Gilmore, Cristiano Migliore, Cristiano Mozzati, Cristina Scabbia
- Producer(s): Don Gilmore

Lacuna Coil singles chronology
"Trip the Darkness" (2011)	"Fire" (2012)	"Losing My Religion" (2012)

"Fire" is a song from Lacuna Coil's sixth studio album Dark Adrenaline.

== Critical reception ==
"Fire" was met with generally mixed reviews and was met with criticism due to its pop tones. Rockstar Weekly stated that "Fire" it's "more radio friendly than anything". Loud Wire said that "has a hip-shaking drum beat has a tinge of a dancy feel without losing its edginess. Scabbia sings the very appealing chorus “Let the fire enter / Let the anger start to brew / Let your instincts break the rules / Let it rise and consume / Give into yourself.” Its poetic rhythm and upbeat drum pattern makes the song that more enjoyable".

== Music video ==
The only officially released image from the production of the scrapped "Fire" music video.

The music video for "Fire" was filmed on 10 May 2012 and directed by Brendan Kyle Cochrane. The video was shot in Brooklyn's The Red Hook Grain Terminal at the same place where Martin Scorsese filmed a scene for The Departed.

According to the Italian magazine Panorama, the music video for "Fire", directed by Brendan Kyle Cochrane, will never be released. A frame from the music video, showing Cristina Scabbia, appeared on the official website of the production company of the video.

- Director: Brendan Kyle Cochrane
- Director of photography: Bruce Cole
- Editor: Jonathan Rouzier
- Production company: NYLAHD

An editor's cut version of the video was leaked on Vimeo on 29 September 2013.

A 2016 interview with Scabbia revealed that the band had opposed releasing the video due to concerns they were showing visual signs of fatigue after four months of touring, but relented after the video had leaked.

== Track listing ==
Digital Download

1. "Fire" - 2:55
2. "Dark Adrenaline" - 3:19

== Chart performance ==
Chart (2012)	Peak position
Italian (Rock Chart)	14

== Release history ==
Country	Date	Format
Germany	15 June 2012	Digital download
Austria	15 June 2012	Digital download
Switzerland	15 June 2012	Digital download
