= Torch (company) =

- Company type: Private
- Industry: Fire detection technology
- Founded: 2020
- Founders: Michael Buckwald, Vasya Tremsin, Anton Tremsin
- Headquarters: San Francisco, California, United States
- Area served: Worldwide
- Products: Infrared sensors, visible cameras, gas sensors
- Services: Early detection of outdoor fires

Torch is an American company based in San Francisco, California that develops technology for early detection of outdoor fires. Founded in 2020 by Michael Buckwald, Vasya Tremsin and Anton Tremsin, Torch uses infrared sensors, visible cameras and gas sensors to detect fires.

== History ==
The sensor was developed in 2017, and won the Intel ISEF Best of Category Award in Earth and Environmental Sciences at the 2018 Intel International Science and Engineering Fair.

In March 2023, a national online survey conducted by Propeller Insights on behalf of Torch Sensors concluded that the majority of respondents believe that wildfires can negatively impact the economy and that the problem will continue to increase as the world battles climate change.

== Technology ==
Gas sensors measure the smoke content and air quality. Visible cameras are used to separate flames from the environment surrounding them. When a sensor device detects signs of fire it sends notifications through a mobile app. Sensors detect fire on 10 acres (40,468 square meters).
