= Fires (Yourcenar book) =

1936 book by Marguerite Yourcenar

- Author: Marguerite Yourcenar
- Original title: Feux
- Translator: Dori Katz
- Language: French
- Publisher: Éditions Grasset
- Publication date: 1936
- Publication place: France
- English publication date: 1981
- Pages: 214

Fires (French: Feux) is a 1936 prose book by the French writer Marguerite Yourcenar. It consists of aphorisms, prose poetry and fragmentary diary entries alluding to a love story.

== Reception ==
Stephen Koch reviewed the book for The New York Times in 1981, and described it as an "unwritten novel", a type of fragmentary book he compared to works by Rainer Maria Rilke, Colette, Cyril Connolly, and Roland Barthes: "These books insist - on everypage - that they are not novels. They refuse to be novels. Yet through their fragmented alternatives, we still can glimpse the novels they refuse to be - tales otherwise untellable, masked and revealed - for reasons ranging from discretion to despair to a certain visionary breathlessness. ... The unwritten novel among the fantasies and aphorisms of Fires is a classic tale."

== See also ==
- 1936 in literature
- 20th-century French literature
