= Fire-raising =

Fire-raising may refer to:

== Legal ==
- Arson, a criminal offence in the United States, England and Wales (where it is now a sub-division of the offence of criminal damage) and elsewhere
- Wilful fire raising, a criminal offence under Scots Law not directly equivalent to the English Law offence of arson

== Medical ==
- Pyromania, the disorder causing a person to set fires

== See also ==
- Fire making, the process of artificially starting a fire
- Firestarter (disambiguation)
